= Kadazan-Dusun =

Indigenous ethnic group of Borneo

Dusun / Mamasok / Momogun / Pasok Momogun
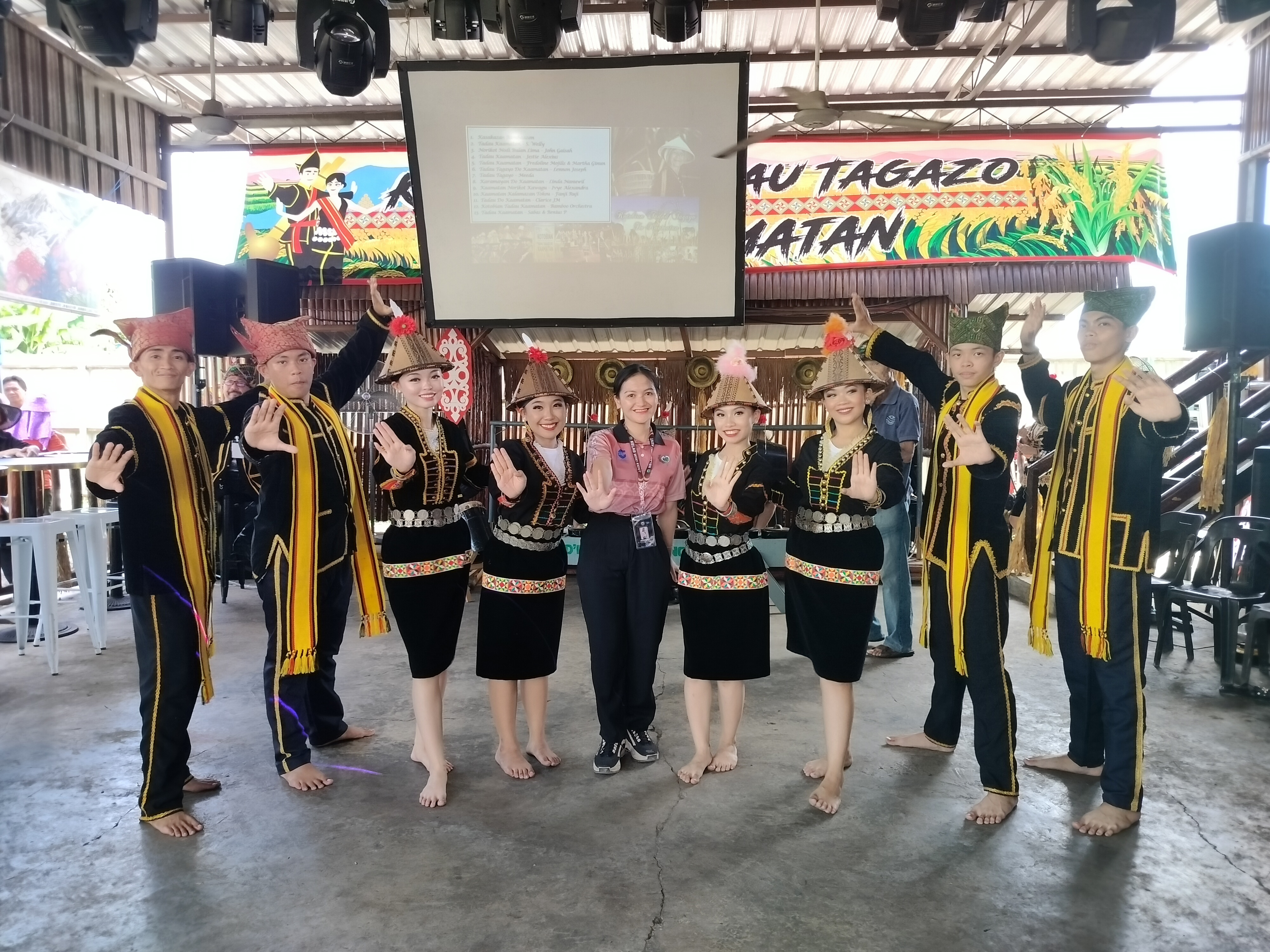
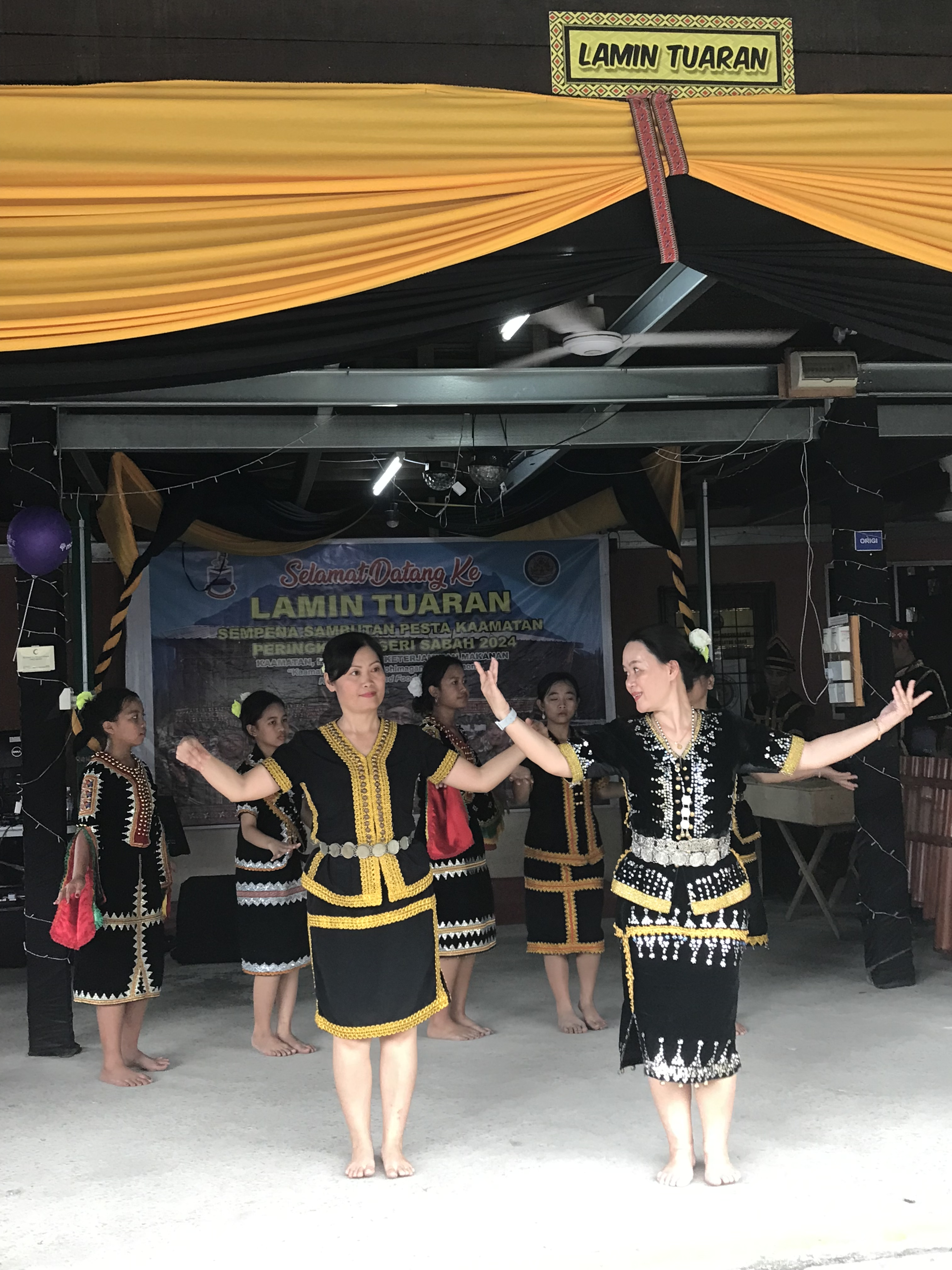
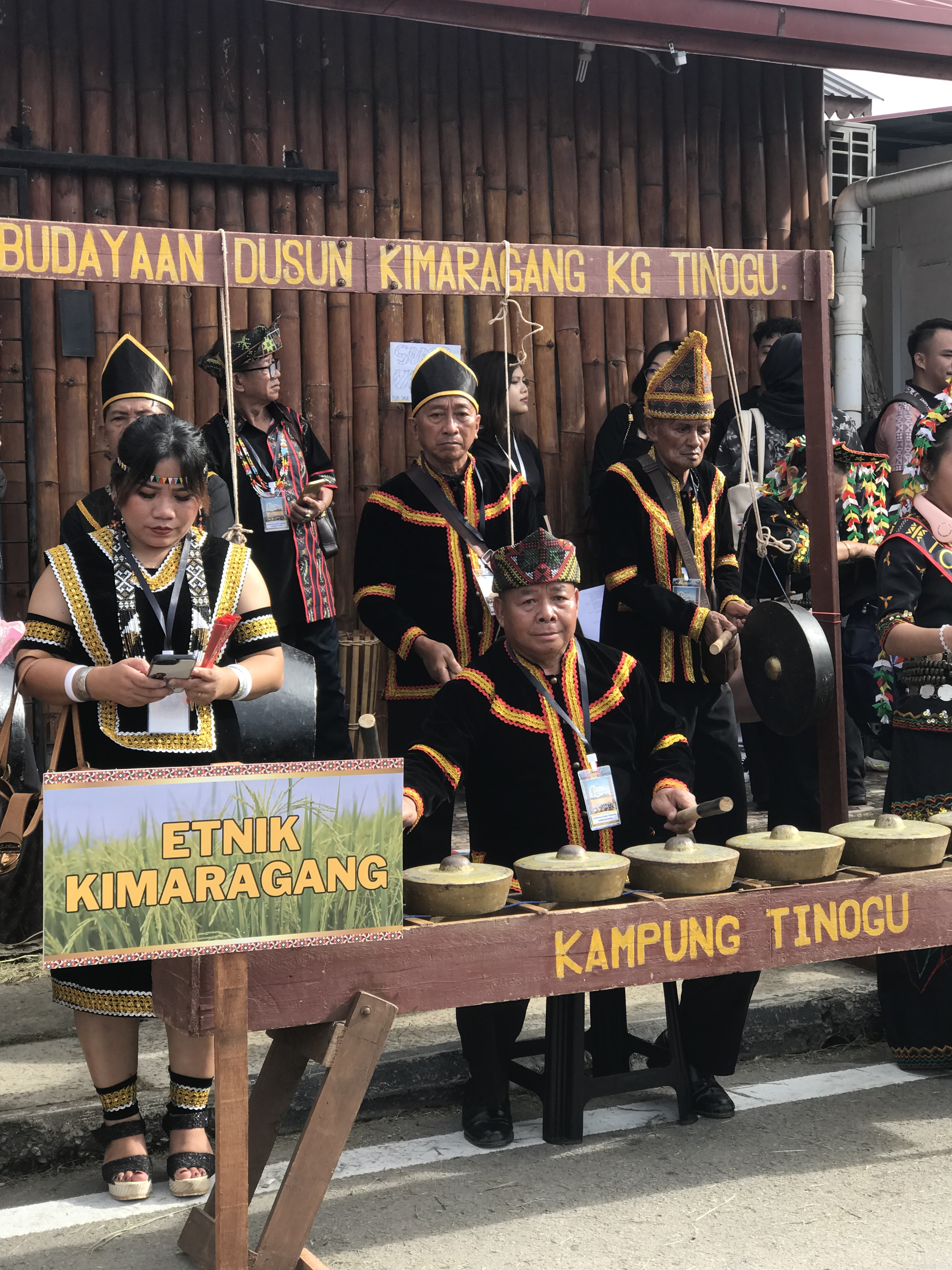
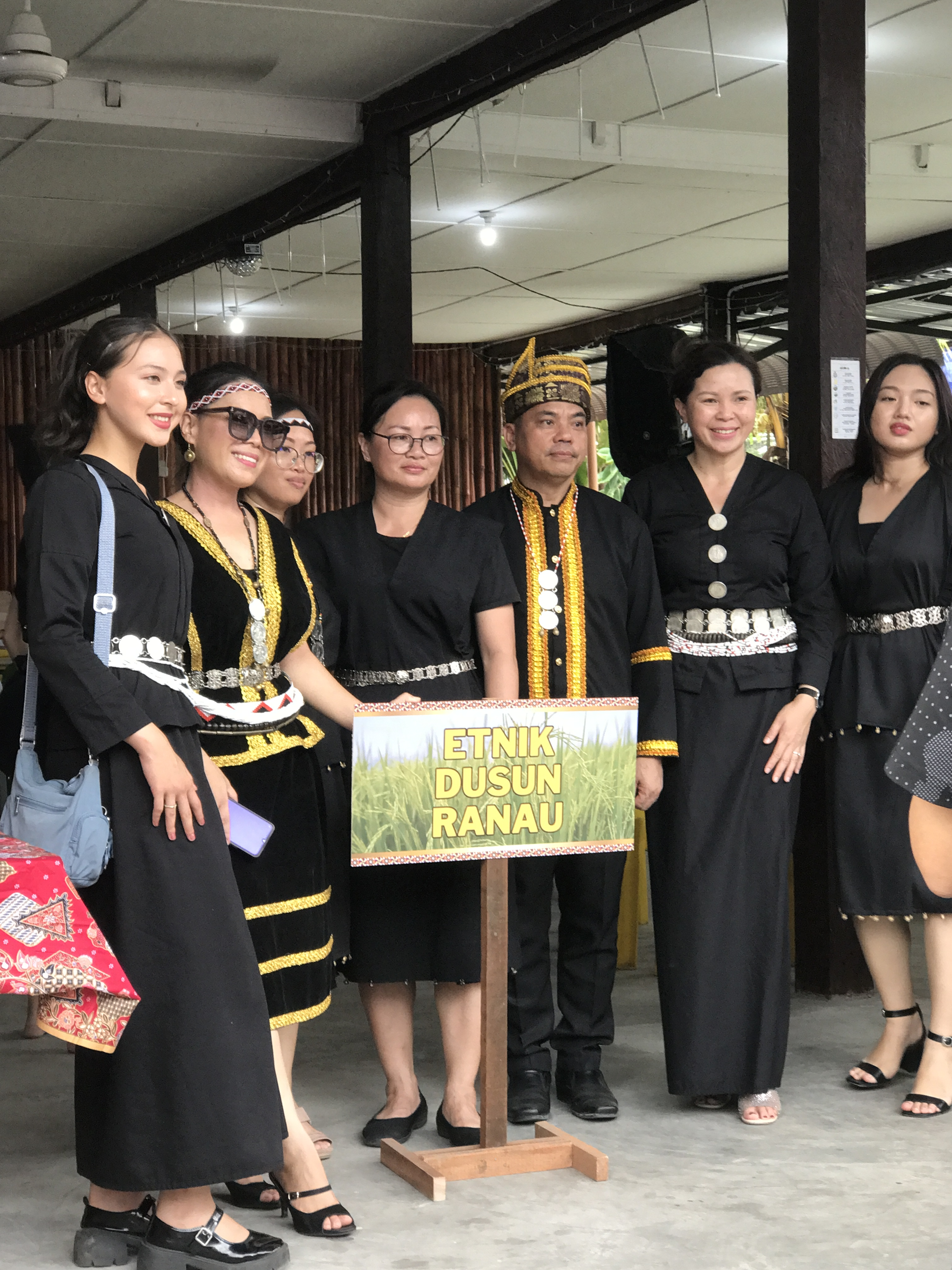
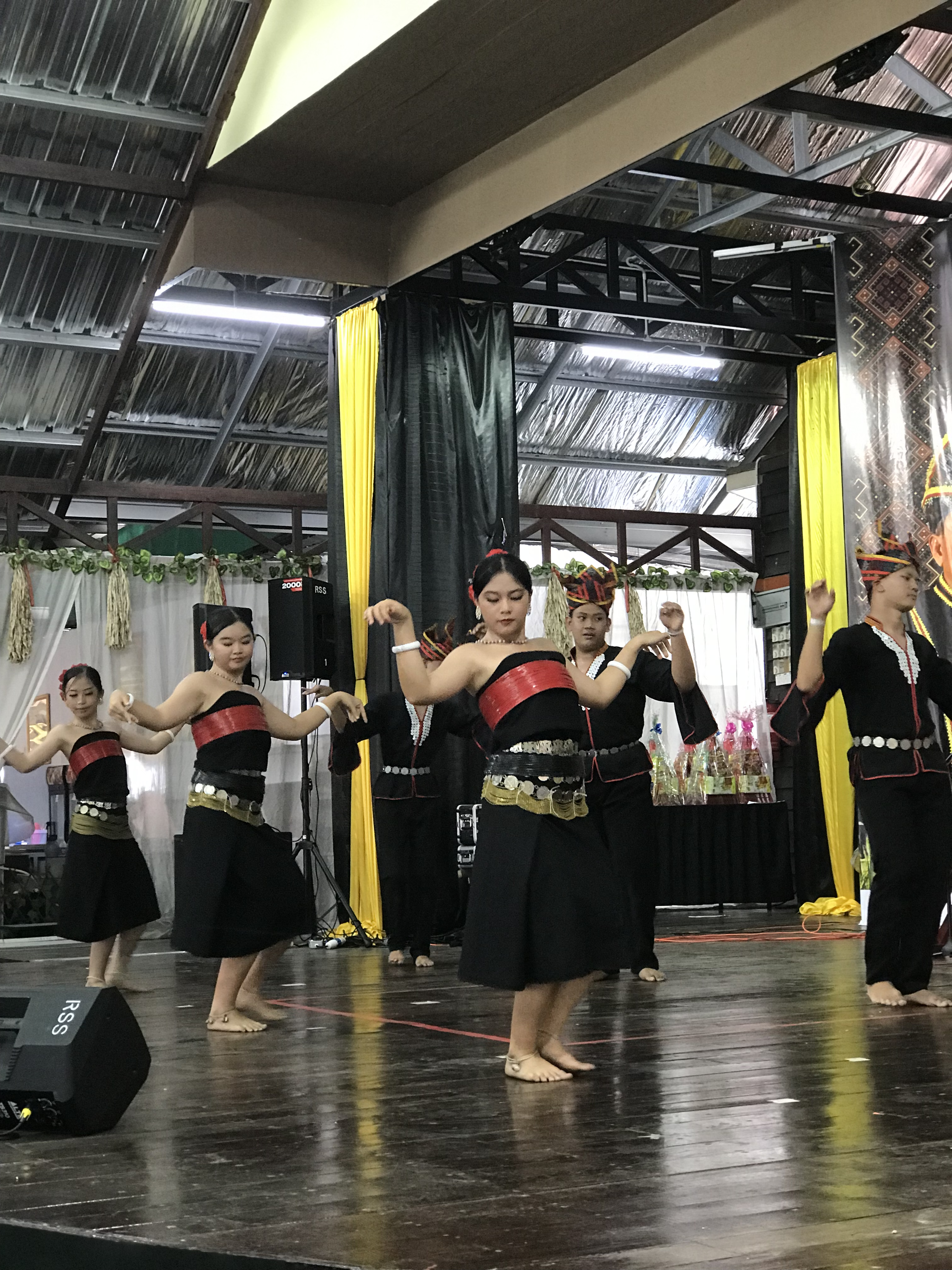
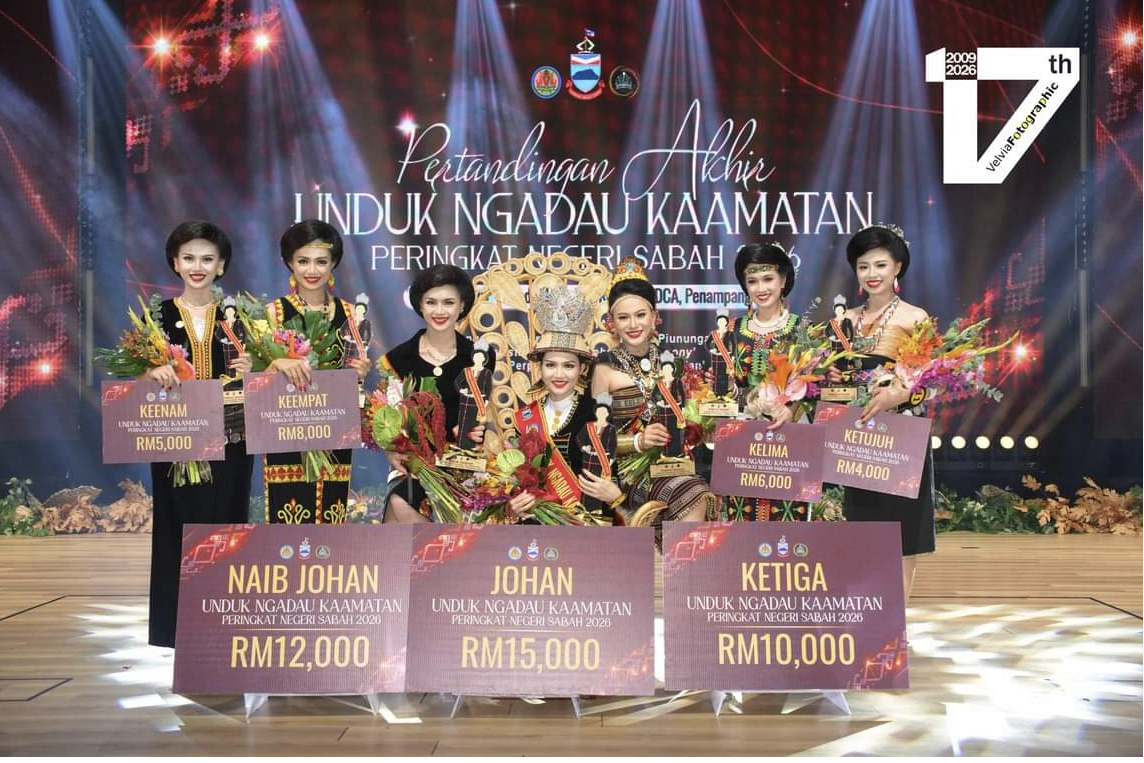
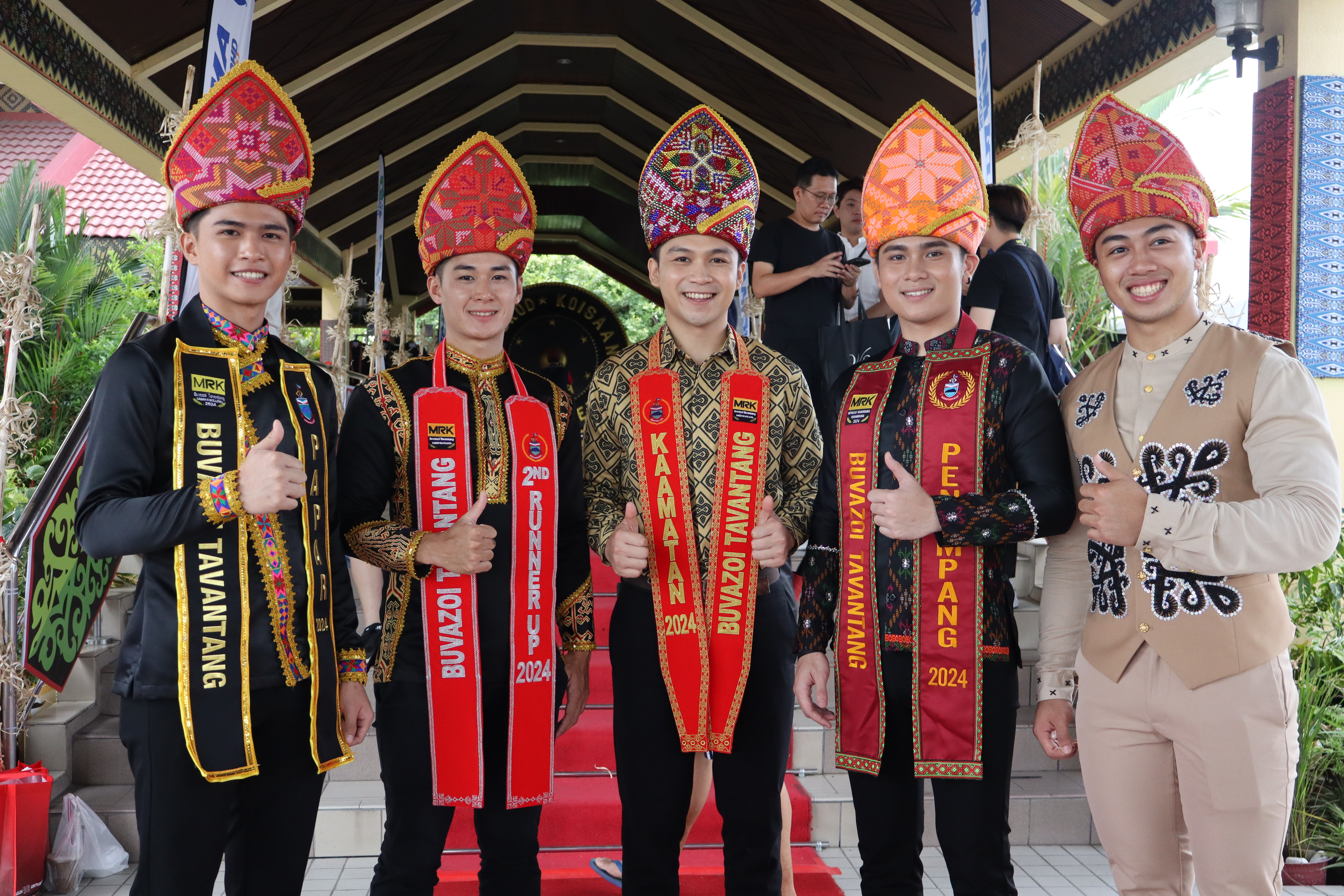
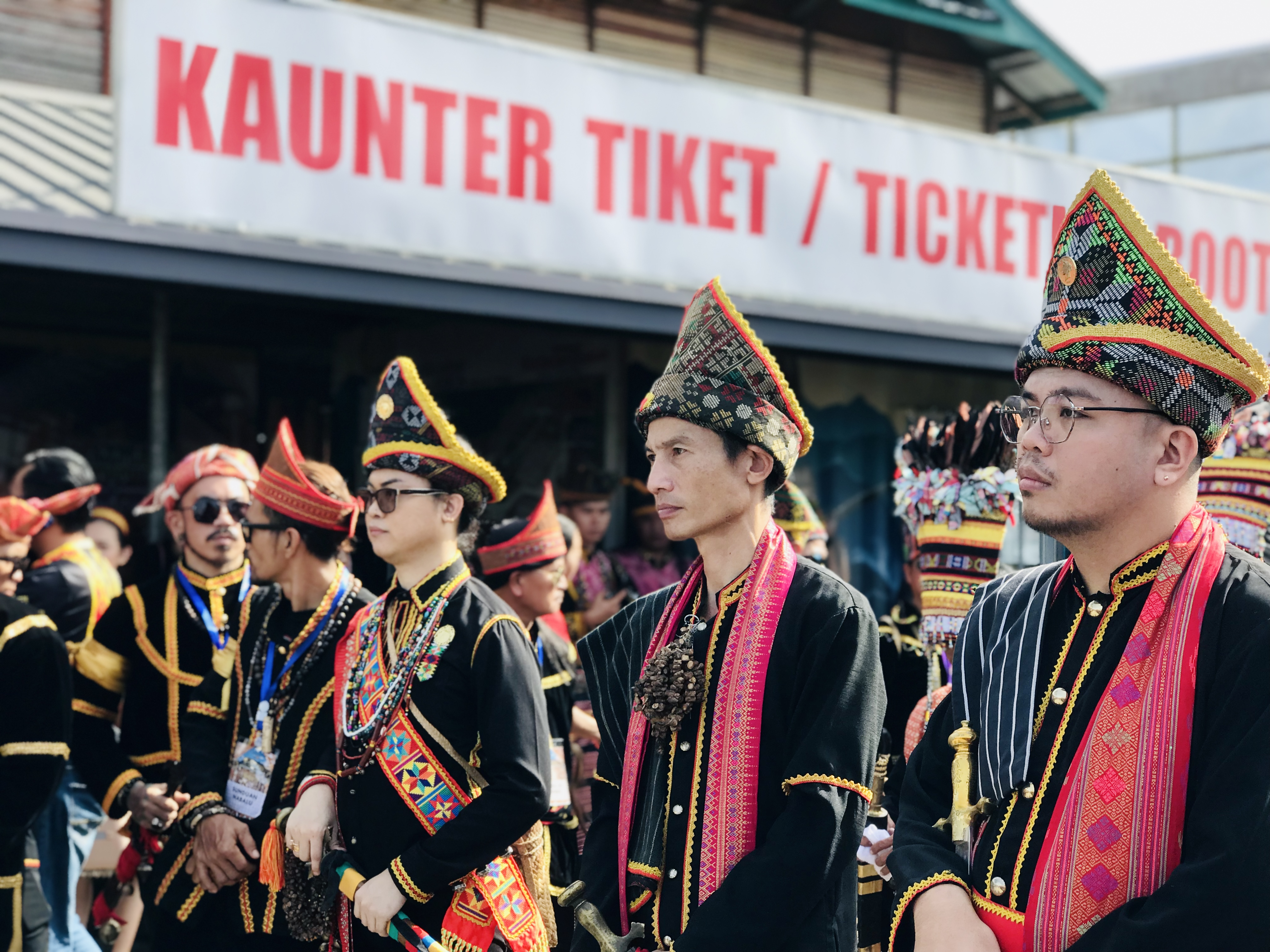
- From clockwise: Tangaa' Kadazan of Papar with their siyung, Kimaragang Dusun of Kota Marudu with their kulintangan, Tindal Dusun of Kota Belud performing their mongigol (dance), Unduk Ngadau female pageants, Buvazoi Tavantang (present-day Randawi Tavantang) male pageants, Lotud Dusun male of Tuaran in their attire, Liwan Dusun of Ranau with their abaya attire, and Lotud Dusun of Tuaran female performing their sumayau (sumazau)

Total population
- c. 1 million (Note: Through a combination of both the Kadazan and Dusun ethnic groups, they number between 700,000 and 800,000, with diaspora communities in West Malaysia and beyond bringing the total above one million.); 31.7% of 56.6% Sabah Bumiputeras (2025)

Regions with significant populations
- Malaysia (Sabah, Federal Territory of Labuan, West Malaysia)

Languages
- Native; Dusunic languages (especially Dusun, Coastal Kadazan, Eastern Kadazan, and Klias River Kadazan language); Also; Sabah Malay • Standard Malay • English

Religion
- Christianity (mainly Roman Catholic and Protestant) (majority), Islam (Sunni), and Animism (Traditional religion (Momolianism))

Related ethnic groups
- Dusunic related peoples; (Kadazan; Dusun; Kwijau; Tatana; Lotud; Brunei Dusun); Dayak • Iban • Melanau • Lun Bawang/Dayeh • Murut • Kedayan • other Austronesian peoples

Kadazan-Dusun (also simply written as Kadazandusun) is a combined term for two closely related indigenous ethnic groups of Sabah in Malaysia, which is formed as an amalgamation of the closely related Kadazan and Dusun peoples. They formed the main and largest indigenous group in the state, numbering almost a million individuals, with the population concentrated in Sabah's West Coast Division, upper Interior Division, and Kudat Division, as well as within the Sandakan and Tawau divisions. It is also an umbrella term that encompasses various sub-ethnicities, tribes and sub-tribes under both the Kadazan and Dusun labels, with the language typically billed as Kadazan-Dusun, belonging to the Dusunic languages family, an Austronesian language in the northern part of Borneo Island, while several Kadazan-Dusun tribes' languages also fall under different Sabahan language families, such as the Paitanic languages.

Their deep tradition holds that they are descended from the Nunuk Ragang, although not all the ethnics under the Kadazan-Dusun category came from the same location. With their main traditional occupation as agriculturalists, the Kadazan-Dusun celebrate the annual Kaamatan festival to honour their paddy's spirit, the Bambarayon (Bambaazon). Their paramount leader is called Huguon Siou (brave leader), with the majority of their ethnicity now adhering to Christianity, a shift from their traditional religion (Momolianism) following interaction with European powers through the administration of British North Borneo. Towards their animist-pagan past before the arrival of Christianity and Islam, the Kadazan-Dusun practised headhunting together with another closely related indigenous ethnic group, the Muruts.

Throughout the British administration, the Kadazan-Dusun are categorised under the "Dusun" or "Dusunic people" ethnic categorisation, where they are closely related to other Dusunic peoples of Rungus and the Bornean Bisaya, Tombonuo and Orang Sungei (both belonging to the Paitanic people branch) as well as the Murut and Tidung (Murutic people branch). Since 2004, the Kadazan-Dusun have been recognised internationally as an indigenous ethnic group of northern Borneo with documented heritage by the United Nations Educational, Scientific and Cultural Organization (UNESCO). Within Malaysia, the Kadazan-Dusuns are recognised as part of the bumiputera racial ethnic classification in Malaysia, holding the same status as the majority Malays with special rights on their customary and ancestral lands, which are also inherited from past British administrations. Another endonym commonly used for the Kadazan-Dusuns is "Mamasok" and "Momogun", which carries the meaning of "indigenous people" and "people of the land", respectively. Sometimes the two words are combined together as "Pasok Momogun", which carries the meaning "indigenous people of the land", with "the land" referring to either the Kadazan-Dusun's homeland or the whole state of Sabah.

== Etymology ==
The origin of the term "Kadazan-Dusun" is derived from the earlier split of the Kadazan and Dusun ethnic terms. Throughout the British-administered North Borneo, they grouped the entire ethnicity that was associated with "orchards and agriculture" under the single Dusunic ethnic group classification. Within the vocabulary of the Dusunic languages, there is no "Dusun" word, but it was adapted by the British from the tax collector of the Sultanate of Brunei by the 19th century to refer to the agricultural ethnic groups of northern Borneo. English historian, novelist and travel writer Owen Rutter described in his writings "The Pagans of North Borneo" that the Dusuns usually describe themselves generically as a "tulun tindal" (landsman) or, on the West Coast, particularly at Papar, as a "Kadazan". An early census of the British Empire regarding North Borneo recorded the Dusuns in official population statistics as the largest, followed by the ethnic Chinese as the second largest. The Dusuns are the most numerous of the races of British North Borneo, with their numbers amounting to almost half of the region's total population at the time.

=== Origins of the term "Dusun" and "Kadazan" ===
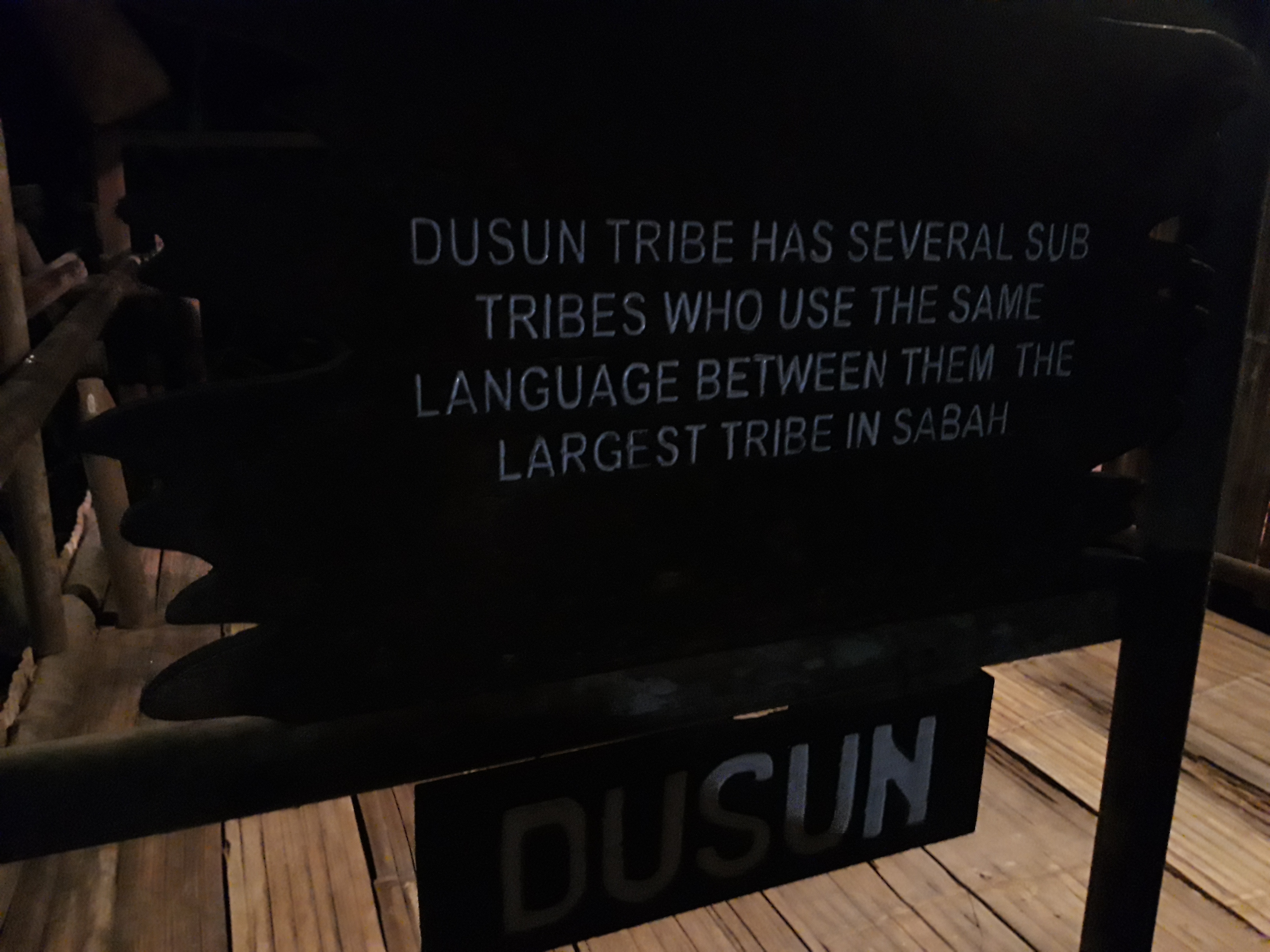
A Dusun tribe sign at the Mari Mari Cultural Village in Kota Kinabalu District; the term carries the meaning of "an assemblage of several sub-tribes" associated with "orchard"

Historically, the term Orang Dusun (which literally means "orchard people") was an exonym, a Malay language term used by the tax collectors of the Sultanate of Brunei to refer to the indigenous people of part of northern Borneo (specifically in the entire West Coast region) they ruled in the past. The term Orang Kadazan, meanwhile, is specific to the areas within the western North Bornean coast (Jesselton, Penampang, Papar, and Beaufort), as this term was widely used around the 1880s by Roman Catholic Christian missionaries, as documented by Fr. J. Staal. Nevertheless, under British protectorate ethnic classifications, they were grouped under the single Dusunic ethnic identity. Between the late 1950s and early 1960s, the term "Kadazan" was originally theorised by local folks as derivatives from the word kakadayan where it was adapted by local Tangaa' speakers as kakadazan which means "towns", or kadai which means "shops", but this does not make sense, as explained in an article by Richard F. Tunggolou. In the fifties, there were only two towns in Penampang, namely Donggongon and Kasigui. Donggongon had about 20 shops arranged in two rows on each side of the road, and Kasigui had about 10 shops built on one side of the road. Except for one shop, all the other shops in both Donggongon and Kasigui were owned by Chinese. The Penampang Kadazans were scattered in numerous villages in the Penampang District and they still are. Why would these people, who never stayed in a town, suddenly decided to call themselves after 'town'. Attempts to relate the origins of 'Kadazan' to 'kedaian' (Malay word 'kedai' meaning shop) does not make sense as 'kedaian' does not exist in the Malay dictionary. 'Kedayan' is equally illogical as it does not make sense for a people to refer to themselves using a foreign word (one pronounced differently from 'Kadazan'), especially taking into account that in pre-Chartered Company days, any contact between disparate groups meant war. Besides the Kedayan people lived too far away for any significant contact or influence over the Kadazan people. The Bobolian or Bobohizan (priestesses) say that the meaning of 'Kadazan' is 'tuhun' or 'tulun' - which means 'people'. Indigenous peoples call themselves 'the people', according to Priit J. Vesilind in his article 'Hunters of The Lost Spirit', published in the National Geographic Vol 163 No 2 February 1983 pp 151–196, depending on where they lived and what ethnic group they belonged to. The term itself is of a Coastal Kadazan language dialect.

The term is used among the Tangara/Tangaa' tribes on the west coast of northern Borneo to distinguish themselves from the majority Dusuns in the interior and eastern part of the entire North Borneo. In the west coast area, specifically in Penampang, the Tangaa' (the midland inhabitants) and several other related tribes such as the "potiang" (the highlanders) and the Kadazan (the lowlanders or people of the plains) preferred to be united under the "Kadazan" term, which was similarly being requested by the Kadazans of Papar earlier throughout the British administration. The Tangaa's pronunciation for the word of kadazan is kadayan, meaning "people of the land" in the west coast Dusunic language. As the word kadayan does not exist in the Tangaa' language vocabulary, it is possible that they got the name from the Dusunic kadayan tribe in Papar (not to be confused with the Malayic Kedayan people), which they assimilated with when the tribe expanded their territory southward from Penampang District. The Tangaa' is a Dusunic tribe who migrated from their ancestral Nunuk Ragang (the same case with other Dusunic tribes such as Tobilung, Tindal, Bundu and Tagahas) to the west coast. Other members of this group include the Membakut Kadazan and Klias Kadazan, each carrying their strong "Kadazan" identity except the Bundu Dusun, Klias Dusun, Kwijau Dusun, Lotud Dusun, and Tatana Dusun, which are not part of the Nunuk Ragang migration. Other sub-families within Dusunic are Bornean Bisaya, Rungus, and the Paitanic-speaking peoples.

Percentage population of Kadazan-Dusun by state constituencies in Sabah, according to 2020 census

In the other parts of North Borneo, mainly in the interior, northern and eastern regions, various Dusunic tribes began to unify under the "Dusun" identity, which was also echoed by the British protectorate administration at the time. Consequently, Dusun tribes such as Lotud Dusun and Tempasuk Dusun (Tindal Dusun), as well as Tatana Dusun on the western coast, also accepted the term as their main identity, with others such as the Bundu Dusun, Kimaragang Dusun, Kwijau Dusun, Liwan Dusun, Tagahas Dusun, Tindal Dusun, Tobilung Dusun, Ulu Sugut Dusuns, the Minokok Dusun, Labuk Dusuns and Kinabatangan Dusuns (Mangkaak, Sukang and Tindakon) representing a strong Dusunic identity. Several further tribes (some belong to the Paitanic branch) are also included in the Dusun ethnic categorisation, such as the Begak, Bonggi, Gana, Lobu, Segama, and Tombonuo. The Kadazans of Penampang, Papar, and Membakut strongly identify themselves with their own Kadazan identity and perceive the "Dusun" term as only exclusive to the interior tribes, although the term encompasses almost all the natives of North Borneo at the time of British administration, with census statistics up until 1960 also using the Dusun category.

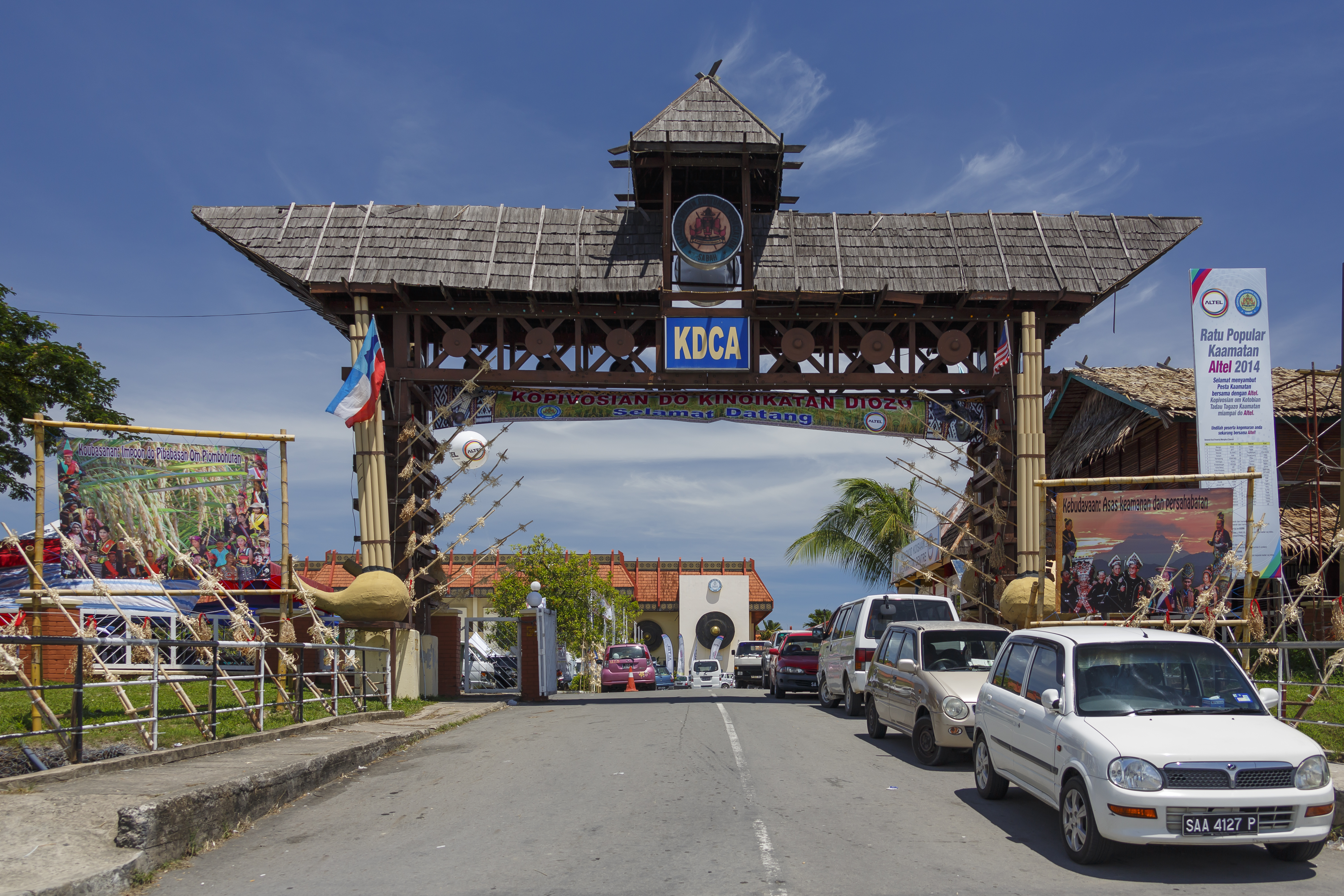
The Kadazan Dusun Cultural Association (KDCA) was established through the merger of the Kadazan Cultural Association (KCA) and the United Sabah Dusun Association (USDA) in 1989, the beginning of the establishment of the Kadazan-Dusun term

Following the establishment of the Kadazan Cultural Association (KCA) in 1953 throughout the administration of the British Crown Colony of North Borneo, this terminology was suddenly replaced with "Kadazan" without further consultation and agreements with other Dusunic groups, which was also used as the official designation of the non-Muslim natives by the first Chief Minister of Sabah, Donald Stephens (Tun Fuad Stephens), when the Federation of Malaysia was formed in 1963. Stephens was a Kadazan, and may have been trying to shore up his political support. Administratively, all Dusuns were suddenly referred to as "Kadazans", which sparked strong opposition from both Kadazan and Dusun sides, who wanted their different ethnicity terms to be officialised and administered separately. The following year, in 1967, the United Sabah Dusun Association (USDA) was formed as the sole representative body for all the Dusun as a way to distinguish themselves from the Kadazan, with the two major indigenous ethnic groups having separated into two representative bodies, further emphasising the terms "Kadazan" and "Dusun" after increasing pressure from various parties desiring a differentiation between the Kadazan and the Dusun. This period subsequently developed the "Kadazan or Dusun identity crisis", which also turned into a "Kadazan versus Dusun feud", which is a precursor to the fall of the ruling state government under the United Sabah Party (PBS).

In November 1989, the PBS, through the mediation and efforts of Chief Minister Joseph Pairin Kitingan, coined the new term "Kadazan-Dusun" to represent both the Kadazan and Dusun, with both the KCA and the USDA merged into a single representative body called the Kadazan Dusun Cultural Association (KDCA). This unified term was unanimously passed as a resolution during the 5th Kadazan Cultural Association's (KCA) Delegates Conference. During the conference, it was decided that this was the best alternative approach to resolve the conflicts that had impeded the growth and development of the indigenous natives since the sentiments were politicised in the early 1960s. It was the best alternative generic identity as well as the most appropriate approach in resolving the "Kadazan versus Dusun" conflicts. Although this action is seen as the best alternative to resolving the ongoing "Kadazan versus Dusun" conflicts since the 1960s, its positive effect is only seen from the year 2000 to the present day when the new generation is no longer in the "Kadazan versus Dusun" feudalism mentality. The unification has since strengthened the ties and brought the Kadazan-Dusun community together as an ethnic group towards more positive and prosperous growth in terms of urbanisation, sociocultural, economic and political development. There are three major parties that represent the indigenous Kadazan-Dusuns within Malaysian political landscapes, the PBS, United Progressive Kinabalu Organisation (UPKO), and United Sabah People's Party (PBRS).

== Background and origin ==
Since the 1990s, there have been claims that the Kadazan-Dusun are descendants from the tribes in southern China due to their relatedness to the origin of Mongoloid stock. There were also rumours that they are closely related or might be descendants of the Bunun tribe in Taiwan, and such speculations were made from observed similarities of their physical features and related cultures between the Kadazan-Dusun and the Bunun people. Although these were proved otherwise based on both mitochondrial DNA (mtDNA) and Y chromosome (Y-DNA) studies and based on the mtDNA and Y-DNA studies, as well as philosophies from genetic and anthropology experts, it is plausible to conclude that Kadazan-Dusun people are indeed the aboriginals of Sabah, and Borneo, as well as one of the leading genetic contributors to Southeast Asian societies. According to a Genome-wide SNP genotypic data studies by human genetics research team from the University of Malaysia Sabah made in 2018, the northern Bornean Dusuns (Sonsogon, Rungus, Lingkabau and Murut) are closely related to Taiwan natives (Ami and Atayal) and non–Austro-Melanesian Filipinos (Visayan, Tagalog, Ilocano and Minanobo), rather than populations from other parts of Borneo.

=== mtDNA studies ===
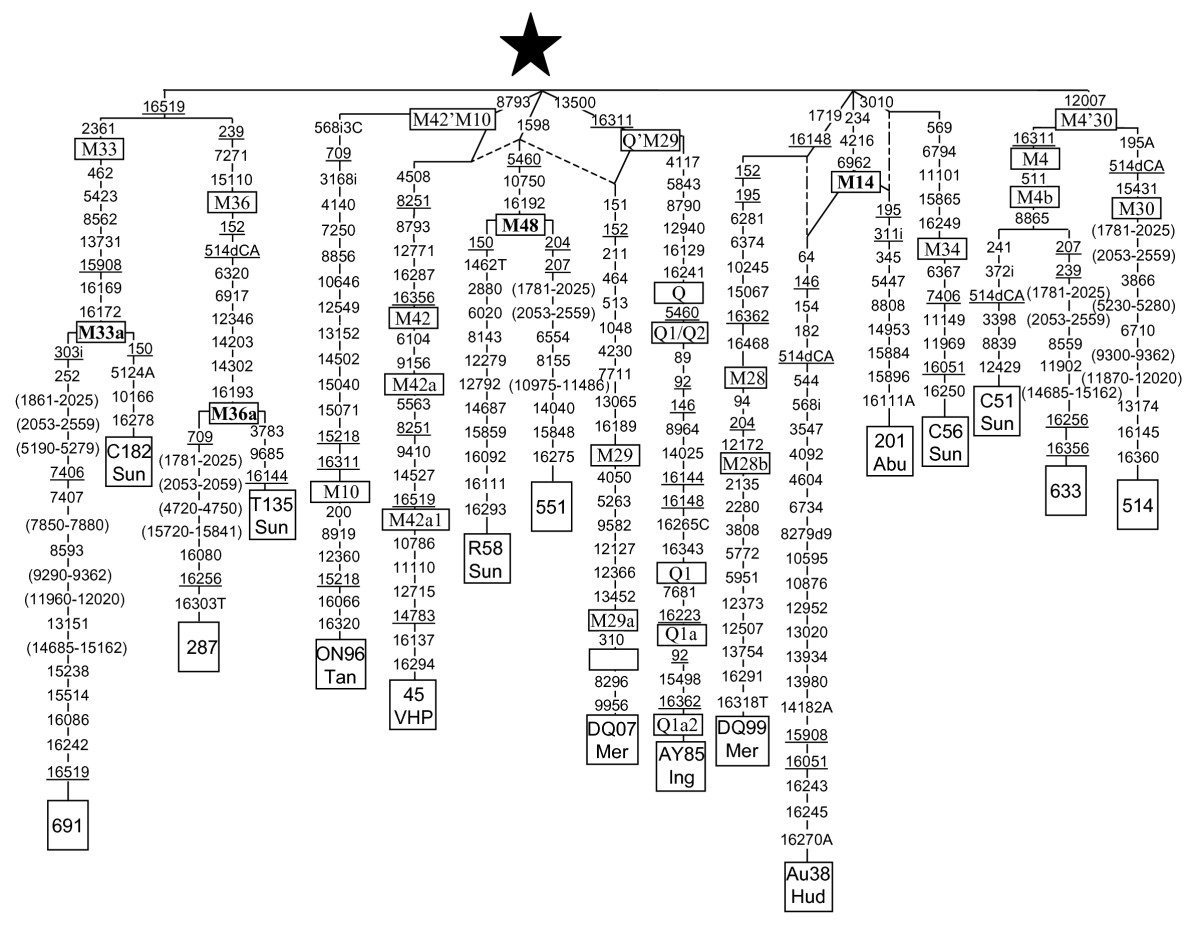
mtDNA haplogroup M

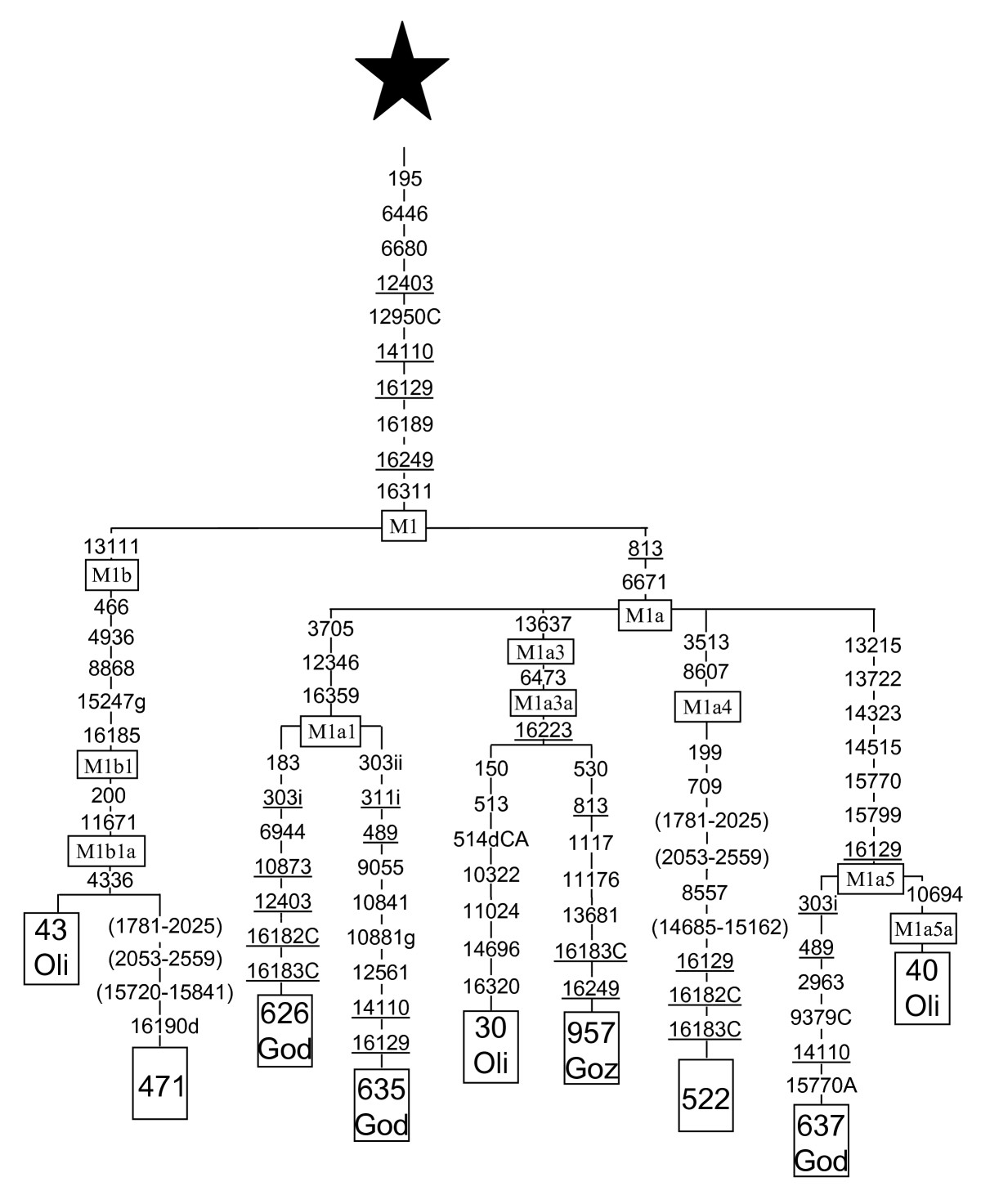
mtDNA haplogroup M1

Maternal or matrilineal Studies using mitochondrial DNA (mtDNA), is a test used to explore genetic ancestry from the mother using mtDNA that is obtained from outside of a nucleus cell that isn't contaminated by the presence of Y-chromosome. According to a study published in 2014, by Kee Boon Pin on 150 volunteers from the Kadazan-Dusun people all over the Sabah region, the Kadazan-Dusun people belongs to 9 mtDNA Haplogroups (subjected to the numbers and types of samples involved in the study), with Haplogroup M being the highest frequency, where it represents (60/150 40%) of all maternal lineages. Followed by Haplogroup R (26/150 17.33%), Haplogroup E (22/150 14.67%), Haplogroup B (20/150 13.33%), Haplogroup D (9/150 6%), Haplogroup JT (6/150 4%), Haplogroup N (4/150 2.67%), Haplogroup F (2/150 1.33) and Haplogroup HV (1/150 0.67%). These mtDNA Haplogroups have multiple subgroup distribution into several subclades due to genome mutations for thousands of years. The Haplogroup M subclades founded were: M7b1'2'4'5'6'7'8 (22%), M7c3c (12.67%), M31a2 (0.67%), and M80 (3.33%). The Haplogroup E subclades founded were: E1a1a (8%), E1b+16261 (4.67%), and E2 (2%). The Haplogroup B subclades founded were: B4a1a (3.33%), B4b1 (1.33%), B4b1a+207 (3.33%), B4c2 (0.67%), B4j (0.67%), B5a (2%), and B5a1d (1.33%). The Haplogroup D subclades founded were: D4s (1.33%), and D5b1c1 (4.67%). For Haplogroup F, H, JT, R and N, there were only 1 subclade founded for each haplogroup: F1a4a1 (1.33%), HV2 (0.67%), JT (4%), R9c1a (17.33%), N5 (2.67%).

Kee Boon Pin studies confirmed the mtDNA studies conducted by S. G. Tan, on his claim of genetic relation between Kadazan-Dusun to another Taiwan aboriginal, the Paiwan people through the sharing of Haplogroup N as the fundamental DNA. However, in his studies published in 1979, S. G. Tan did not emphasise the significant of this finding to the "Out Of Taiwan theory" due to the very small percentage of Haplogroup N found in the Kadazan-Dusun test subjects that is insufficient to represent the whole Kadazan-Dusun ethnicity. S. G. Tan did state that the Kadazan-Dusun ethnic have close genome relation to the other ethnics currently present in Borneo, Peninsular Malaysia and the Philippines, including the Ibans, Visayan, Ifugao, Jakun, Dayak, and Tagalog. According to Ken-ichi Shinoda in his study published in November 2014, the Bunun ethnic have the mtDNA of haplogroup B (41.5%), followed by F (30.3%), E (23.6%), M (3.4%) and N (1.1%).

Although the Kadazan-Dusun ethnic group shared some of maternal mtDNA haplogroups with the Bunun and Paiwan ethnic groups of Taiwan, the high frequency results of haplogroup M and low frequencies of haplogroups B, E, F and N (insignificant to represent the entire said nation) in the genetics of Kadazan-Dusun ethnicity is enough to refute the theory of Kadazan-Dusun ethnic origin from Taiwan. Kee Boon Pin studies also mentioned that the mtDNA of the Kadazan-Dusun ethnic are more diverse with plenty of variability that is missing which might have depleted (through mutations) in the mtDNA of the Bunun ethnic. Genetic depletion indicates newer mutation from the maternal DNA group. Professor Hirofumi Matsumura, who studies in genetics and anthropology, stated that mtDNA sub-haplogroup M7b1'2'4'5'6'7'8 founded in majority of Kadazan-Dusun DNA is one of the oldest mutations from M7 series from haplogroup M that was founded in ancient graveyards in the jungles of Borneo, with estimated age around 12,700 years. It is even older than most discovered ancient M7 series, and spread throughout the Southeast Asia continent creating more M7 mutation series. The mutation series products from M7b1'2'4'5'6'7'8 are present today in several ethnics including Jakun the aboriginal of West Malaysia, Dusun in Brunei, Tagalog and Visayan in the Philippines, and Dayak in Kalimantan and Riau Islands of Indonesia.

=== Y-DNA studies ===
Y chromosome DNA test (Y-DNA test) is a genealogical DNA test that is used to explore a man's patrilineal or direct father's-line ancestry. According to a study by Prof. Dr. Zafarina Zainuddin from Universiti Sains Malaysia, Kadazan-Dusun ethnic belongs to Y-DNA haplogroup of O2-P31 (O-268), which she believes plays an important role in the modern Malay genome sequence. O2-P31 is a mutation product of M214 as a maternal haplogroup with the following mutation sequences: M214> M175> P31> O2. This study was also validated by a genetic study group from National Geographic that revealed STR test results through samples taken from Kadazan-Dusun residents of Kota Belud town in 2011. The STR results were: DYS393: 15 DYS439: 12 DYS388: 12 DYS385a: 16 DYS19: 15 DYS389-1: 13 DYS390: 25 DYS385b: 20 DYS391: 11 DYS389-2: NaN DYS426: 11 DYS392: 13, which explains the specific composition of the Y chromosome according to the Y-DNA haplogroup of O2-P31 (O-M268). Mutation sequences for O2-P31 are shown in the Phylogenetic tree below:

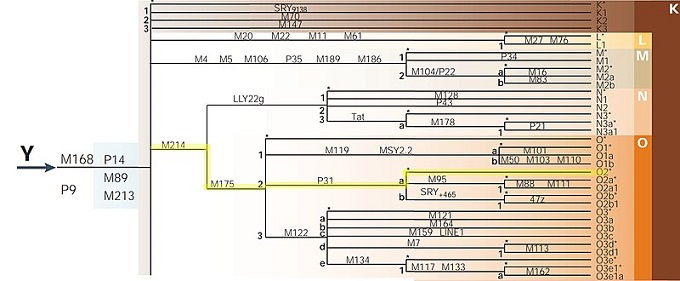
Mutation of Y-DNA O2-P31

According to the Y-DNA study by Jean A Trejaut, Estella S Poloni, and Ju-Chen Yen, the Bunun ethnic in Taiwan belongs to Y-DNA haplogroups of O1a2-M50 and O2a1a-M88. Both of these Y-DNA haplogroups are also the result of mutations of M214 as their maternal Y-DNA haplogroups with the following mutation sequences: M214> M175> MSY2.2> M119> M50> O1a2, and M214> M175> P31> M95> M88> M111 / M88> PK4> O2a1a. Mutation sequences for O1a2-M50 and O2a1a-M88 shown in the Phylogenetic tree below:

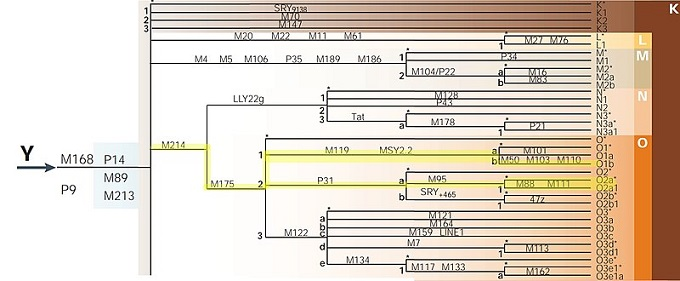
Mutation of Y-DNA O2a1a and O1a2

The age of Y-DNA haplogroup O2-P31 (O-M268) is estimated to be at around 34,100 years through conducted DNA ageing tests on the ancient human bones discovered in Niah Cave, Sarawak. The mean ages of Y-DNA haplogroups of O1a2-M50 and O2a1a-M88 are 33,103 and 28,500, respectively. From the study's result, the claims related to Kadazan-Dusun being ancient migrants from Taiwan are completely irrelevant. This is because the age of the Y-DNA haplogroup O2-P31 belong to the Kadazan-Dusun ethnic group is older compared to the Bunun Y-DNA haplogroups in Taiwan. Initially, the purpose of starting the genetic haplogroup lineage was to determine the origin of the human lineage. However, the objective is yet to be verified to this day due to a lack of pure evidences that is free from contamination. The results obtained from genetic studies so far can only prove the human global travelling activities, but not as evidence to determine the place of origin of migrating humans. For example, the discovery of the Tianyuan man that has no conclusive answer to his place of origin.

== Culture and society ==
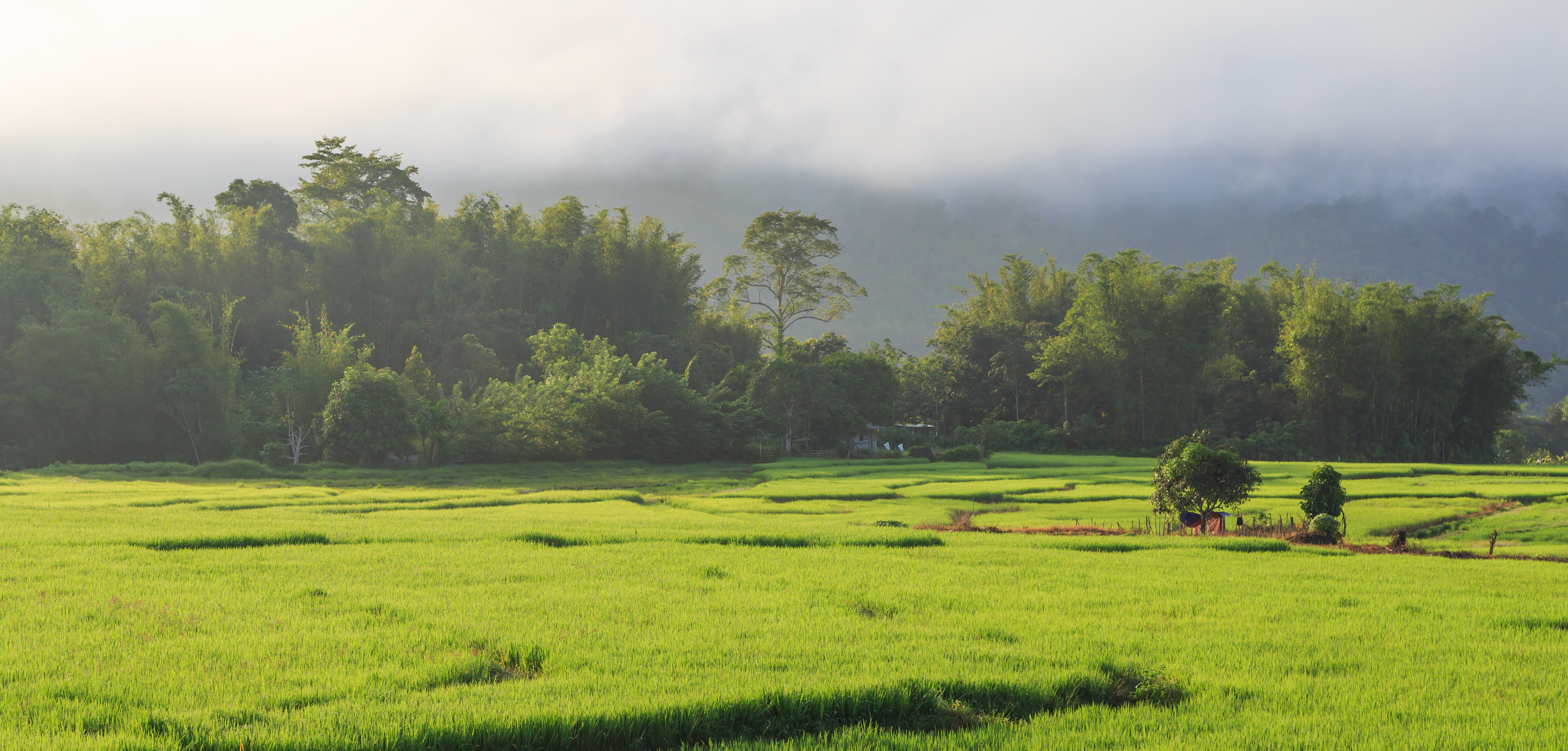
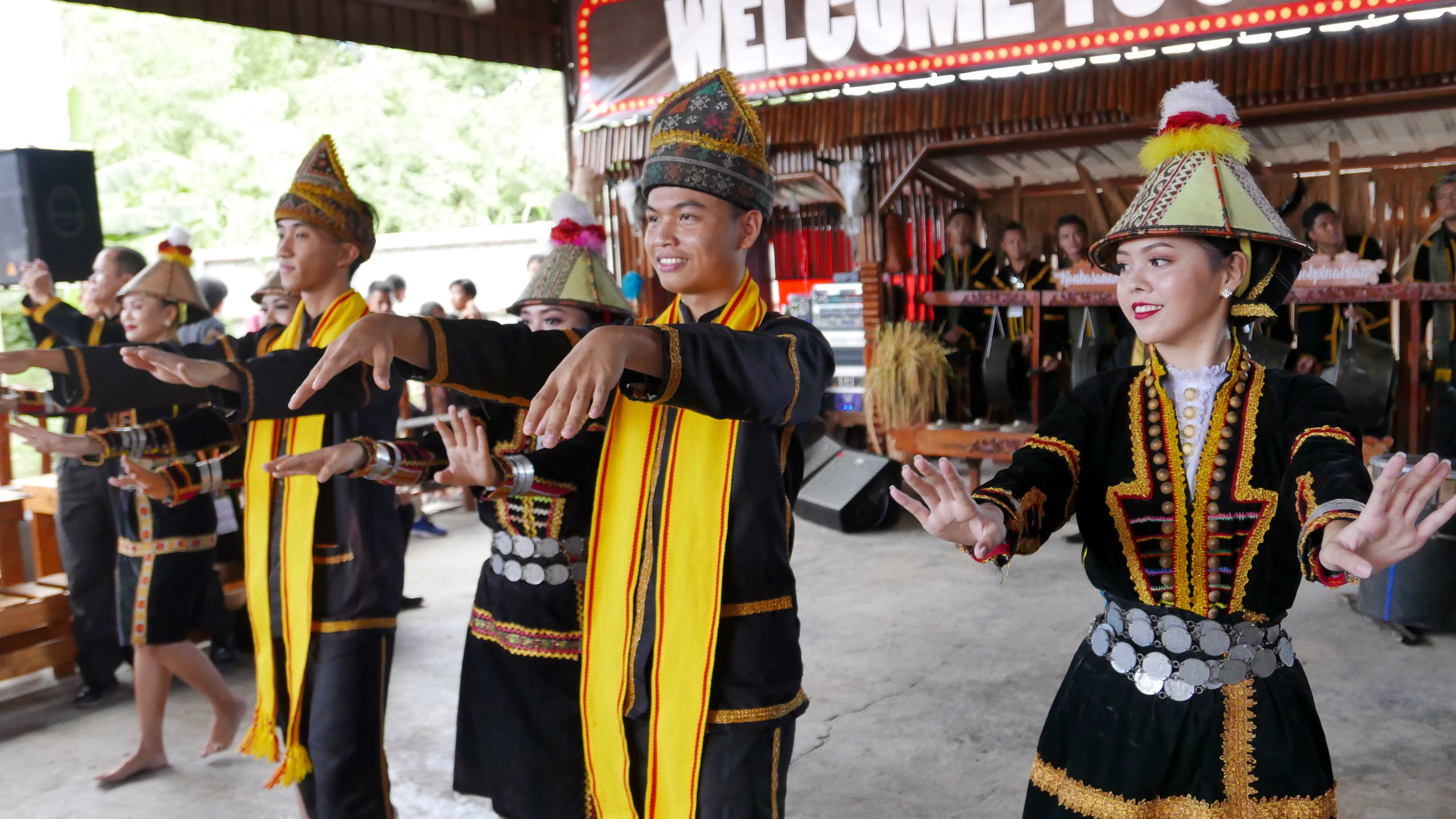
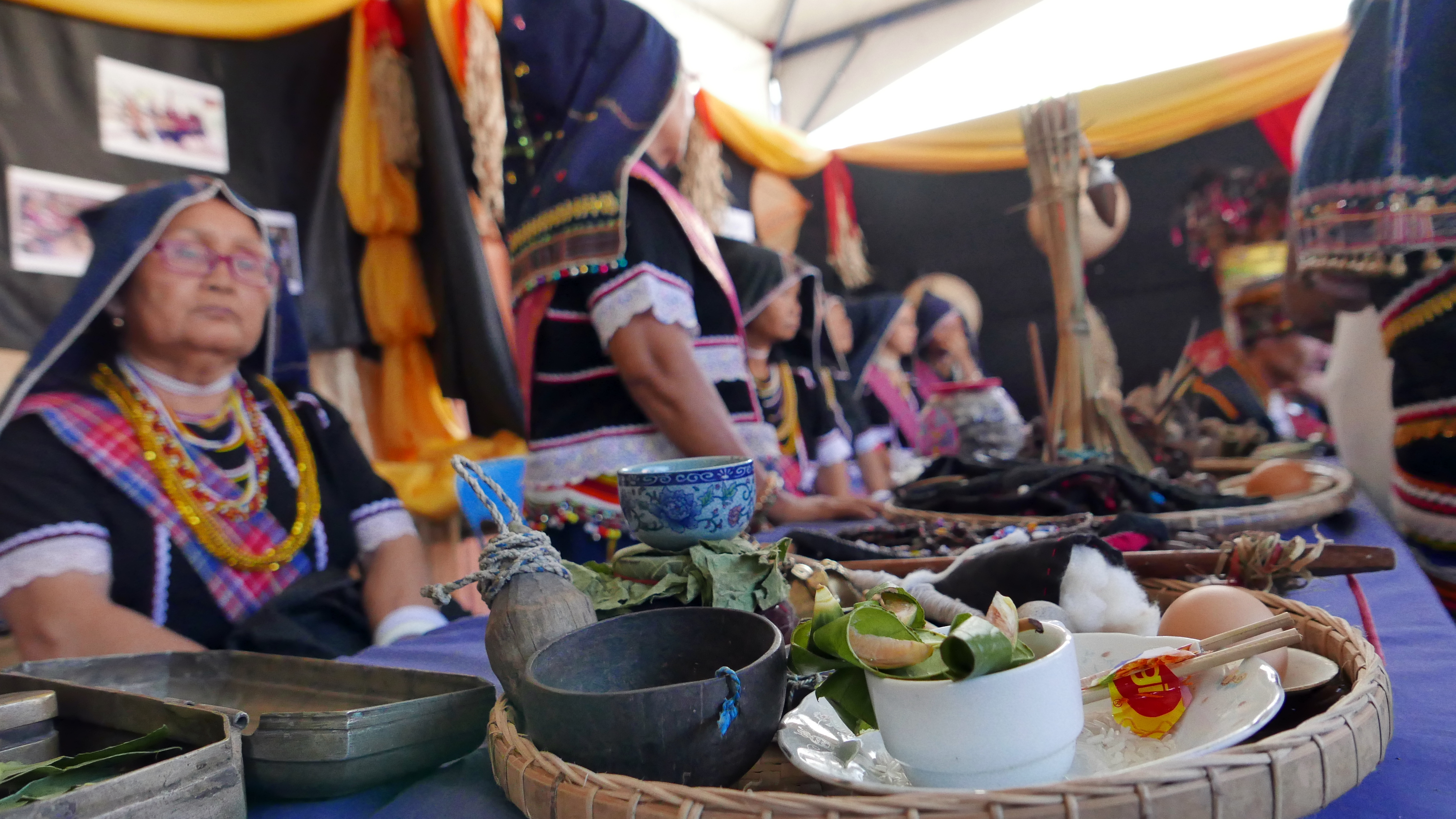
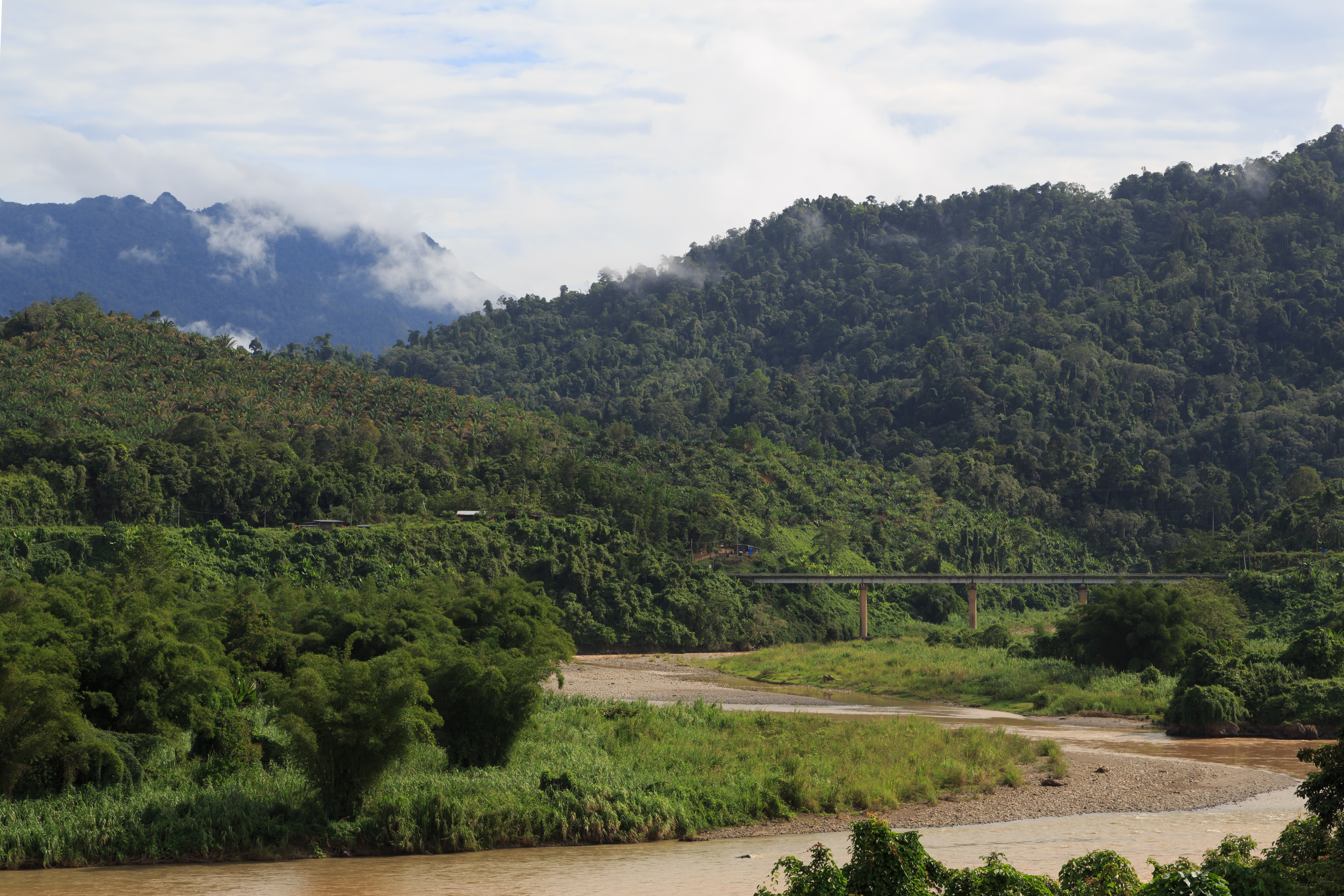
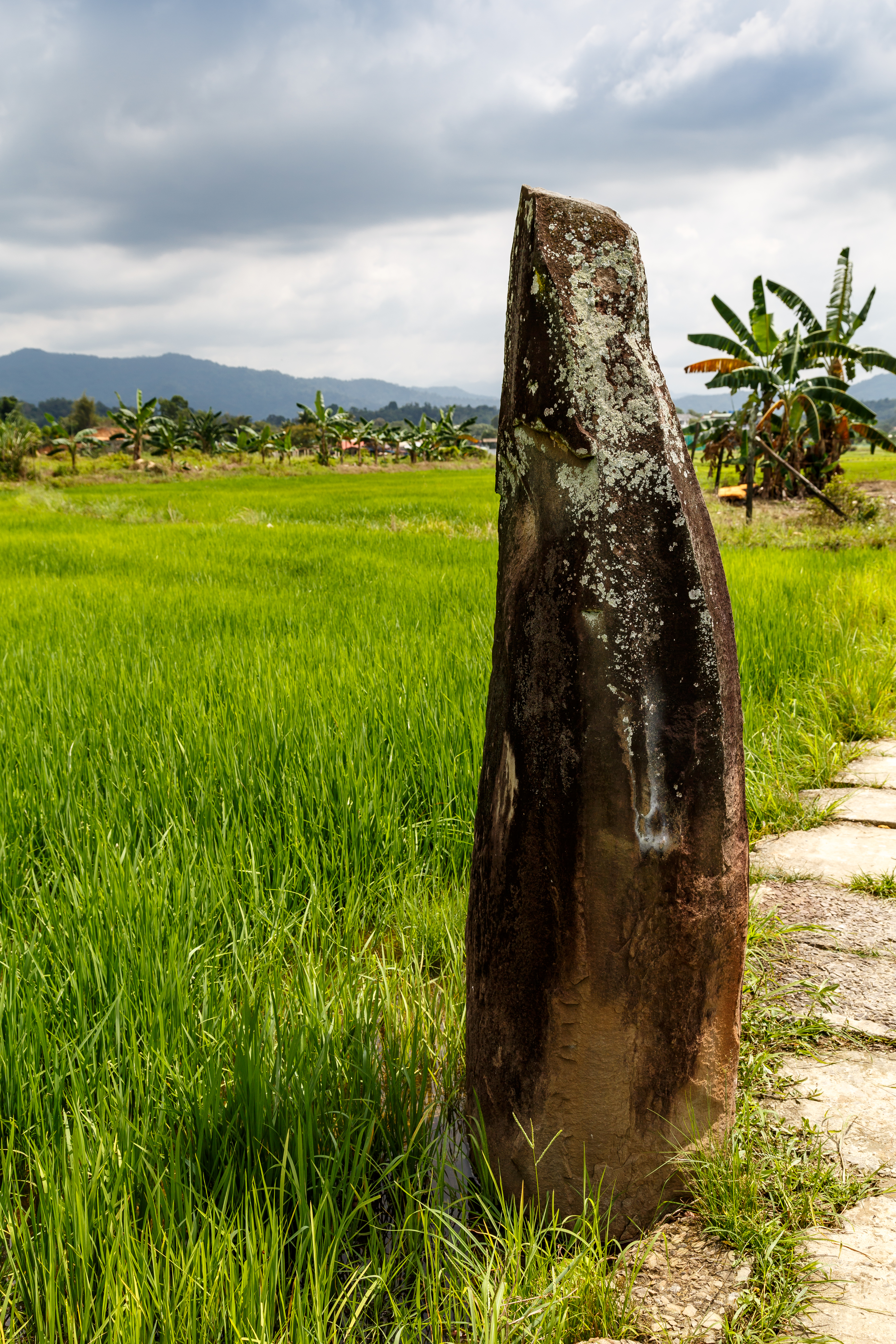
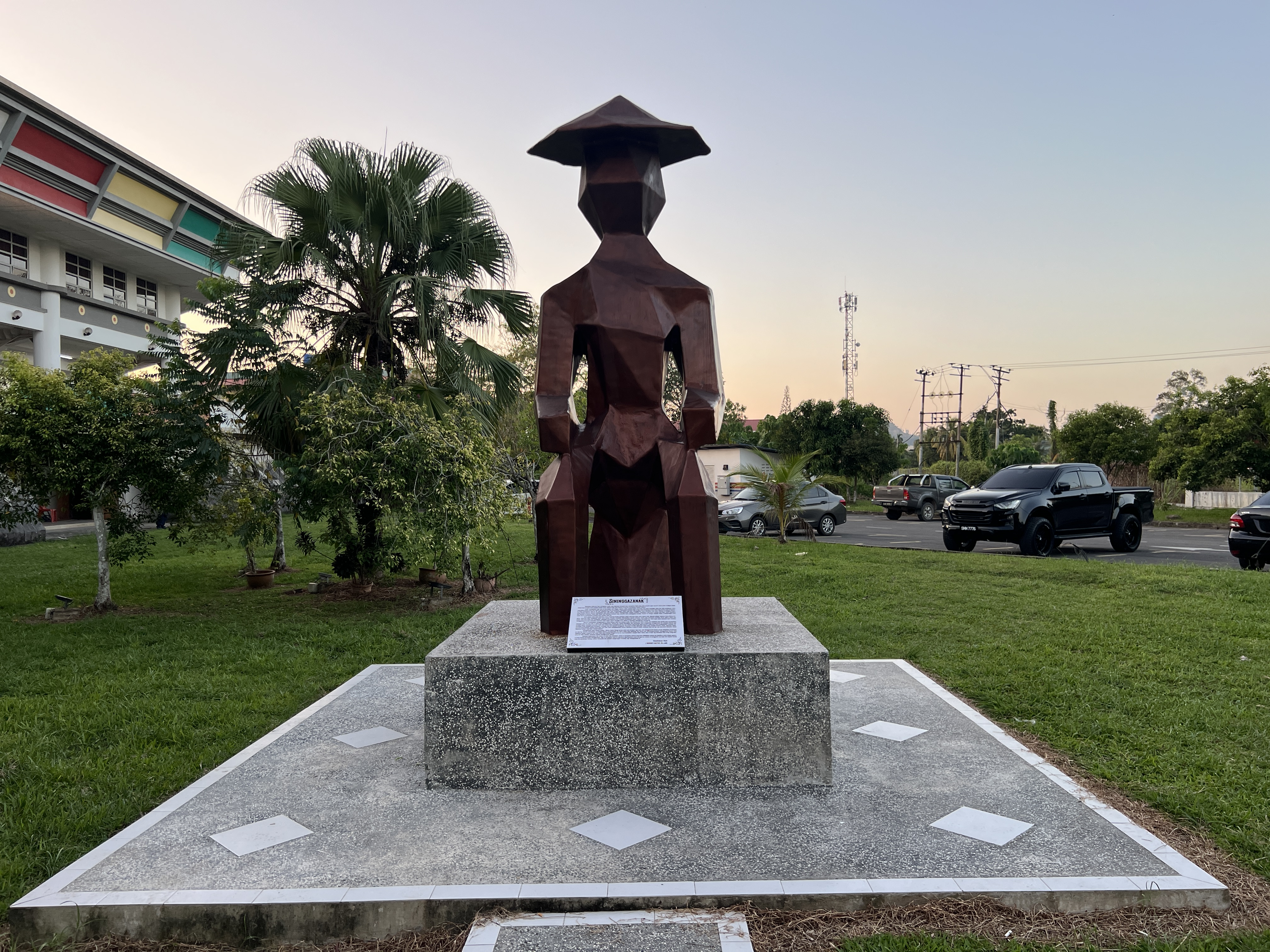
Clockwise from upper right: Papar Kadazan in their sazau dance; Dusun mountains within Liwagu River near Nunuk Ragang; Kadazan Sininggazanak and a menhir in Donggongon of Penampang; Dusun traditional healers (the bobolians), and a paddy field in Tambunan

The Kadazan-Dusun, as the largest and major indigenous ethnic group of northern Borneo, features diverse cultures based on its different sub-ethnic groups within the Dusunic family categorisation. Towards the end of the British rule in North Borneo, Kadazan-Dusun-based parties governed the state of Sabah. (Note: The control of Sabah by indigenous parties was weakened since the 1980s due to internal divisions and the entrance of West Malaysia-based parties that began to damage the region's balanced social and religious demographics. Further, millions of Muslim immigrants, mainly from neighbouring Indonesia and the Philippines, were brought into Sabah, which further shifted political power away from indigenous peoples, which disregards what had been promised earlier through the 20-point agreement of the Malaysia Agreement, especially in the context of religious freedom when Islam was controversially designated as Sabah's official religion through the attempts of the third Chief Minister of Sabah, Mustapha Harun, in 1973.) Their culture is deeply rooted in the Nunuk Ragang and known as the main agricultural ethnic group within North Borneo with a deep connection with nature, (Note: The introduction of Abrahamic religions to the indigenous is partly affecting the indigenous traditional laws since it fails to incorporate old beliefs which were important to sustain and control the use of lands and forests. Traditional agriculture laws introduced by the indigenous are part of the concepts of maintaining world balance and renewal, which have significantly eroded through modern conditions and circumstances.) with their main occupations in traditional eco-friendly agricultural practices—most notably wet-rice and hill-paddy farming. From this also arose the customary (Adats), which played a part in the traditional life of Kadazan-Dusun, providing the rights to collect forest produce and hunt wild animals while heavily restricting the over-exploitation of these resources with laws recognised and gazetted under the Native Customary Rights (NCR) of Sabah. One of the indigenous conservation systems, the tagal are used to sustainably manage freshwater fisheries in rivers. The ethnics are also known for their various menhirs, oath stones, guardian stones, memorial stones, and living stones, as well as wooden monuments which are found in different locations around the indigenous homeland regions and were once practised widely within their traditional religions. The use of sigup kirai and langkum is widespread among the Kadazan-Dusun elderly, especially among females.

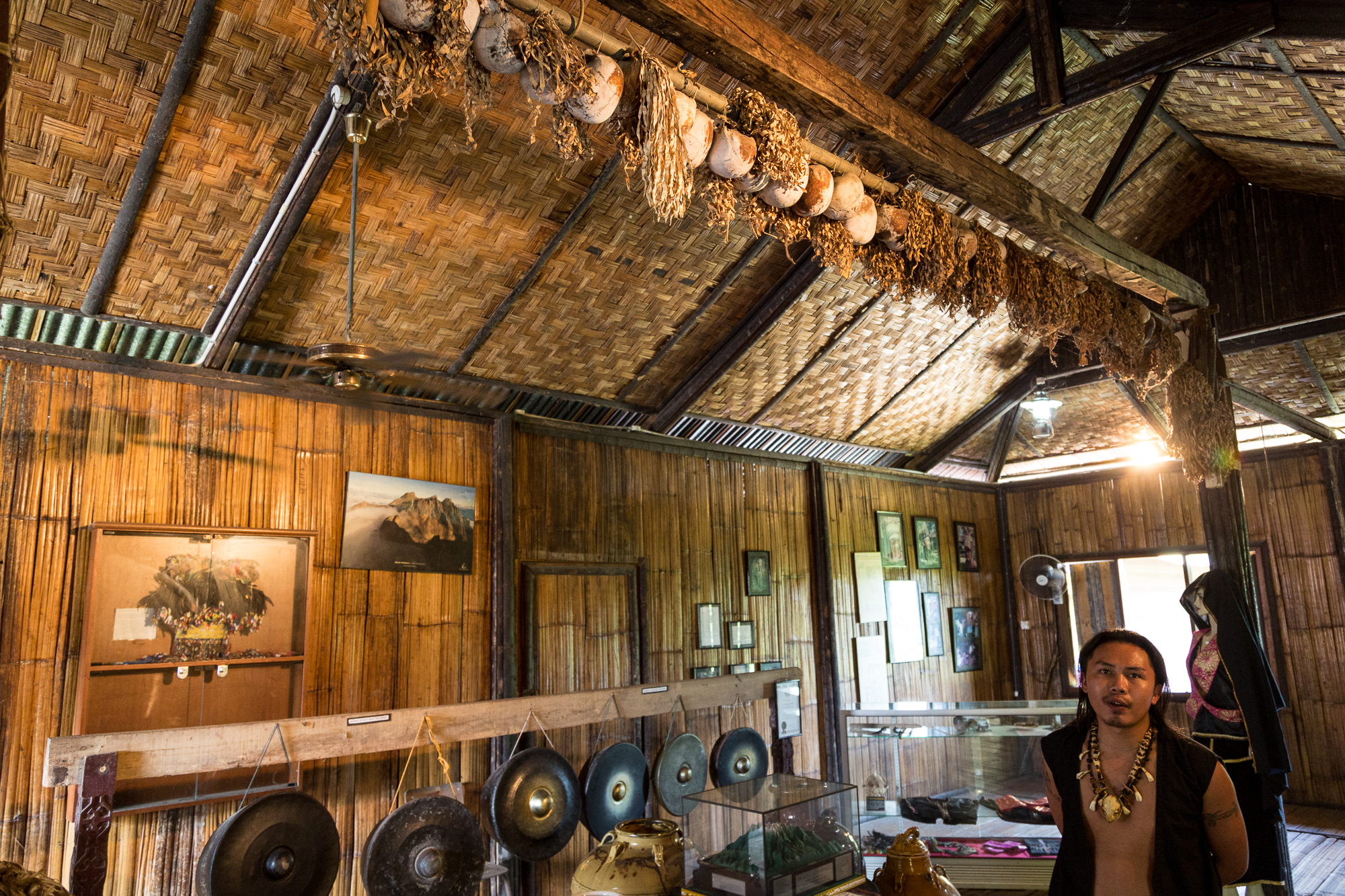
Human skulls hung on display

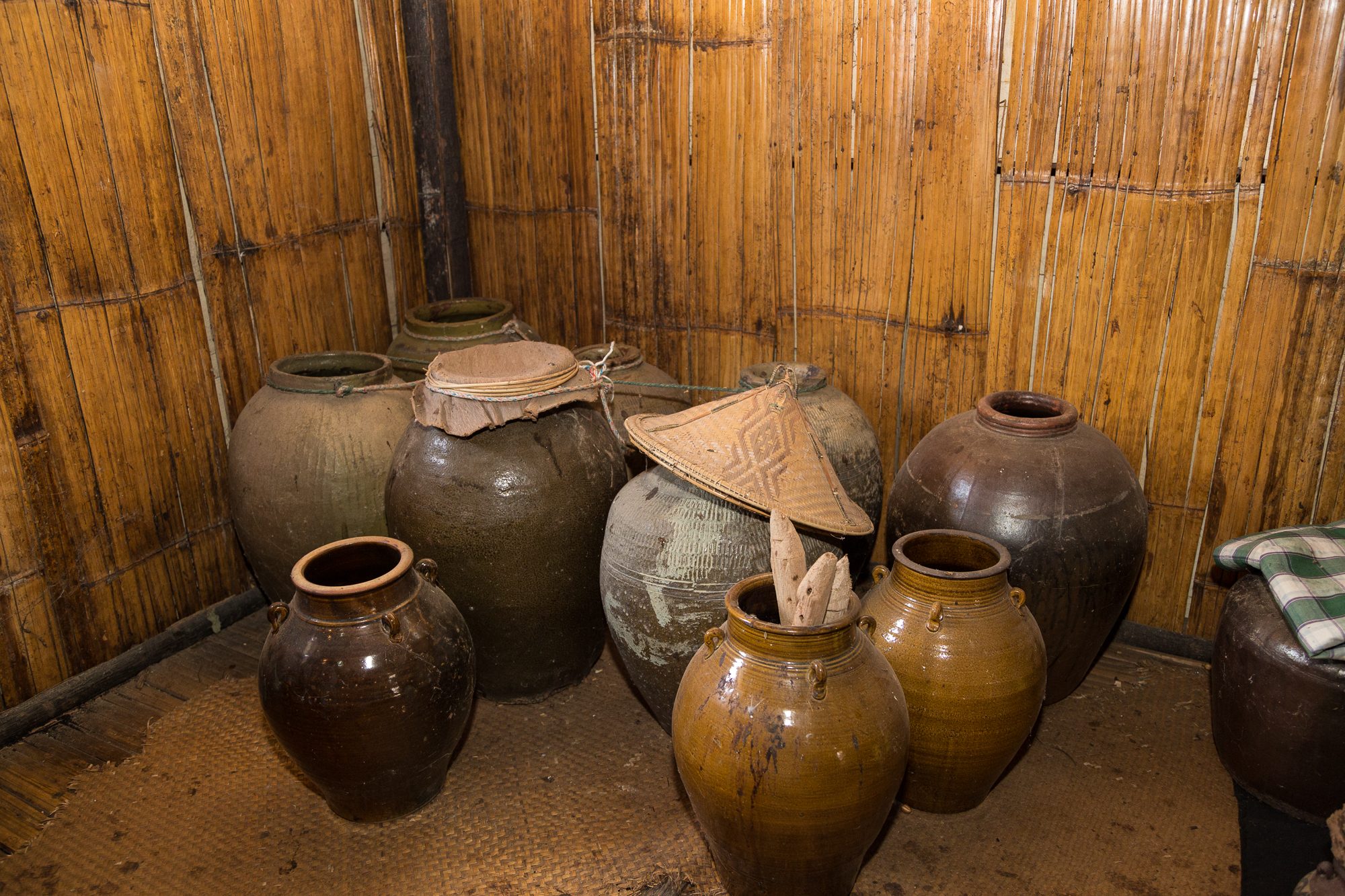
Tajaus

From right to left: The Tajaus used for the storing of tapai (indigenous alcoholic drink) and human skulls gathered from the Kadazan headhunting past in the Monsopiad Heritage Village

In the past, before their massive conversion towards their current major religion of Christianity, the Kadazan-Dusun, together with the Murut and Sarawak's Iban, were notoriously and fearlessly known for their headhunting practices. The beheaded heads are kept and maintained using ancient practices and rituals, with traditional beliefs maintaining the use of the beheaded heads as a housekeeper amulet or talisman and that every house should have its guardians where the tandahau spirit (skull spirit in the form of a chicken) from the beheaded head is summoned for the purpose of protecting the house and its inhabitants from the attacks of enemies and wild animals. Many of the heads once taken by Kadazan-Dusun warriors are still preserved within their respective villages, with some located within the Monsopiad Heritage Village (Tangaa' Kadazan) of Penampang District, Lipasu Village (Kujau Dusun) in Bingkor of Keningau District, Susui Sangod Borneo (Lotud Dusun) of Tuaran District, Bangkawang House (Tinagas Dusun) in Tibabar Village of Ranau District, and Guritom (Tuhawon/Tuwawon Dusun and Bundu-Liwan Dusun) in Sunsuron Village of Tambunan District.

There were also wide ancient Kadazan-Dusun beliefs that it was important to place beheaded heads under any newly constructed bridge since every river had a spirit of water that was called tambaig (tombuakar in different Dusunic dialects). The beheaded heads will be placed or hung below the bridge as a peace offering for the spirit so that the bridge will not collapse. During this period, there were massive fears against what is being called pangait/pengait (bounty or rogue headhunters) folklore, which will wander to find human heads especially children for such purposes. Beheaded heads are also used by bobohizan or bobolian for medical purposes, as well as the worship of the ancestors' spirits. The most common weapons used by the ancient headhunters of the Kadazan-Dusun are the gayang (parang) of long swords, the blowpipe (sopuk), bujak/bangkaw/tandus/tadus (spear), and a kolid/lamina (shield). This gruesome practice has, however, long been banned by British North Borneo authorities and is no longer practised today. Modern hunting and farm/ancestral land protection improvised firearms, such as the bakakuk are commonly used by the indigenous Kadazan-Dusun, where it is also considered "customary" in rural contexts among the indigenous community. The harvest festival, known locally as Kaamatan is an annual celebration by the entire Kadazan-Dusun ethnic group. It takes place during the whole month of May and culminates in the public holiday on 30 and 31 May, but celebrations begin as early as April as per the traditional calendar once the harvest season ends in that month.

=== Cuisine ===
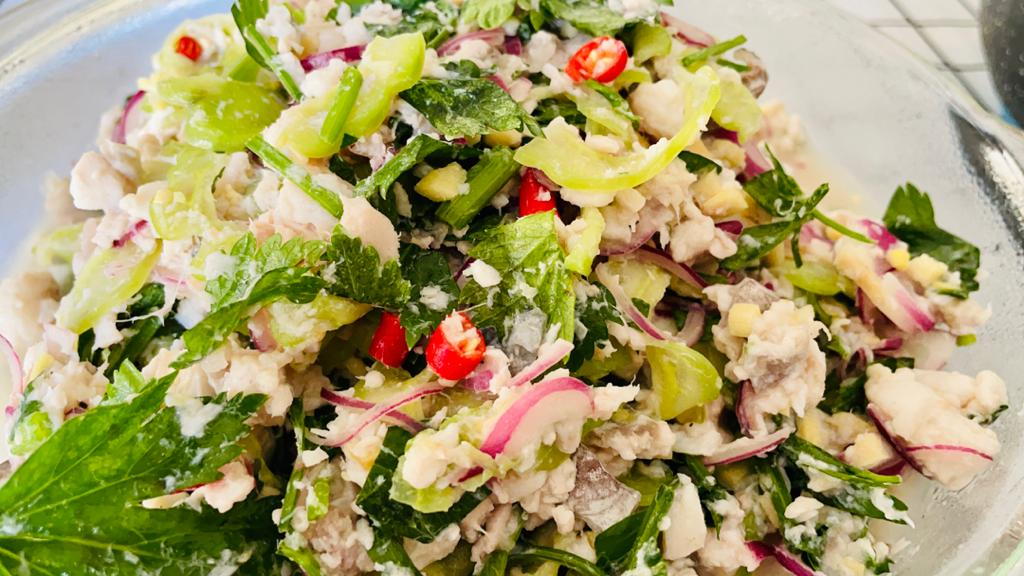
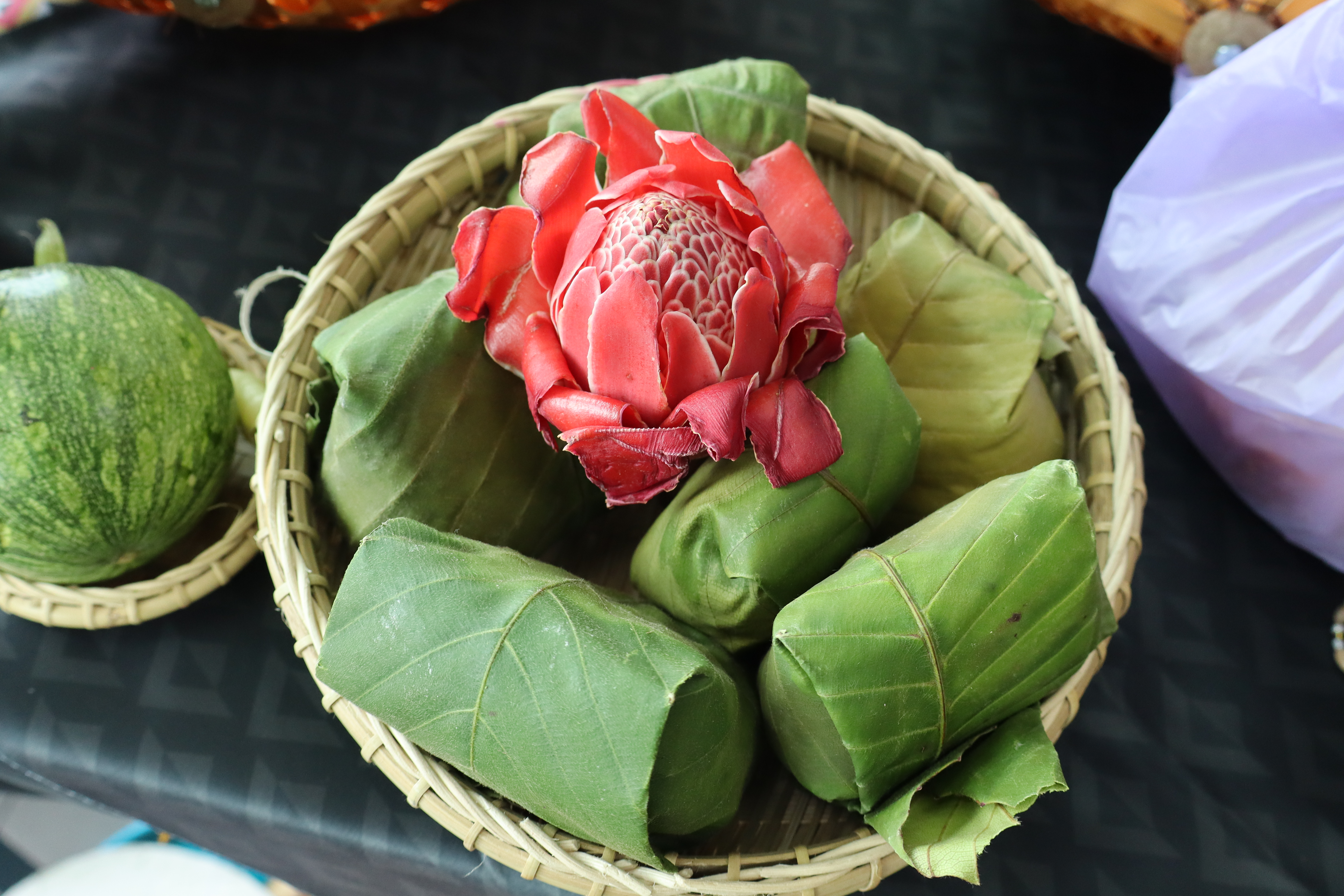
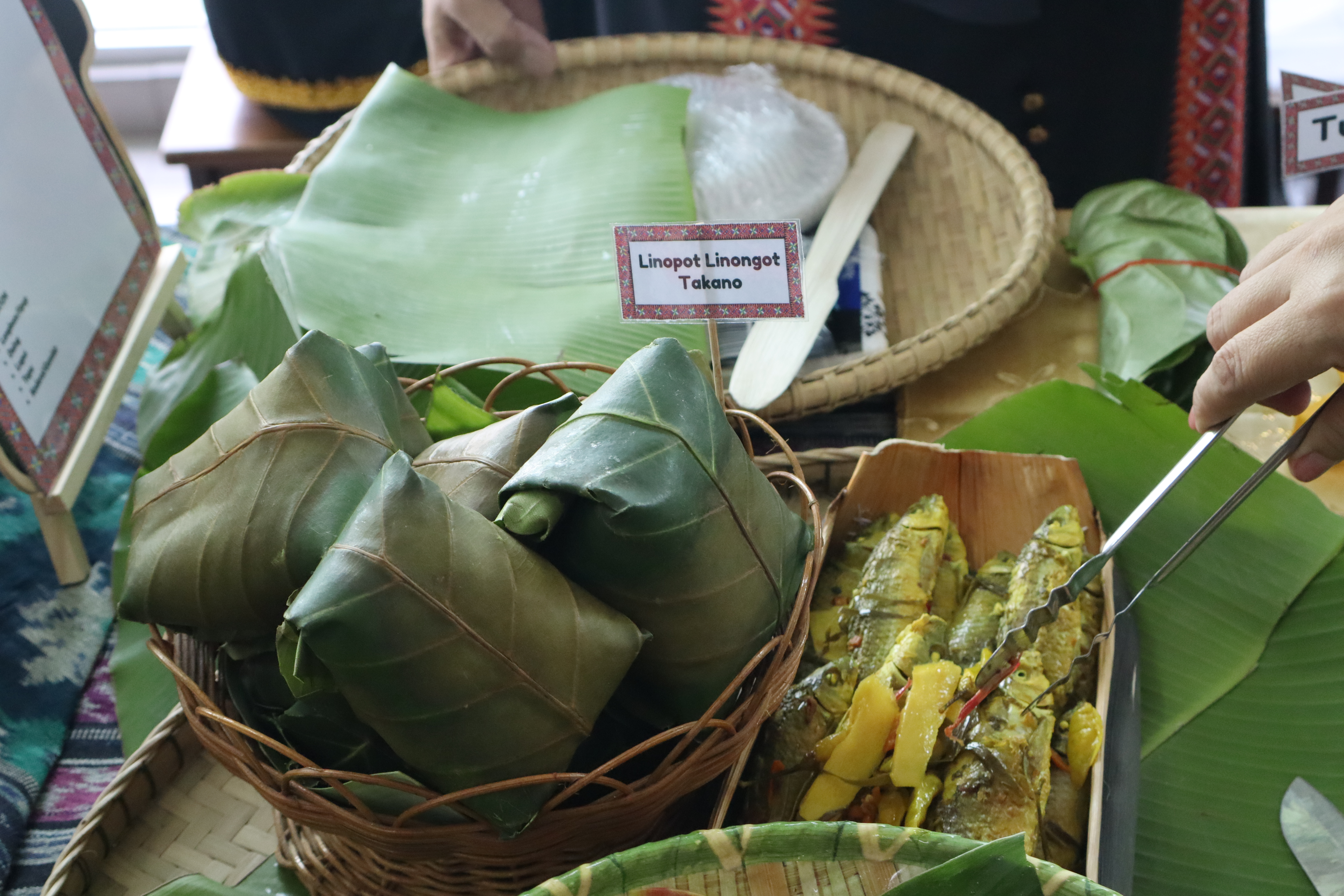
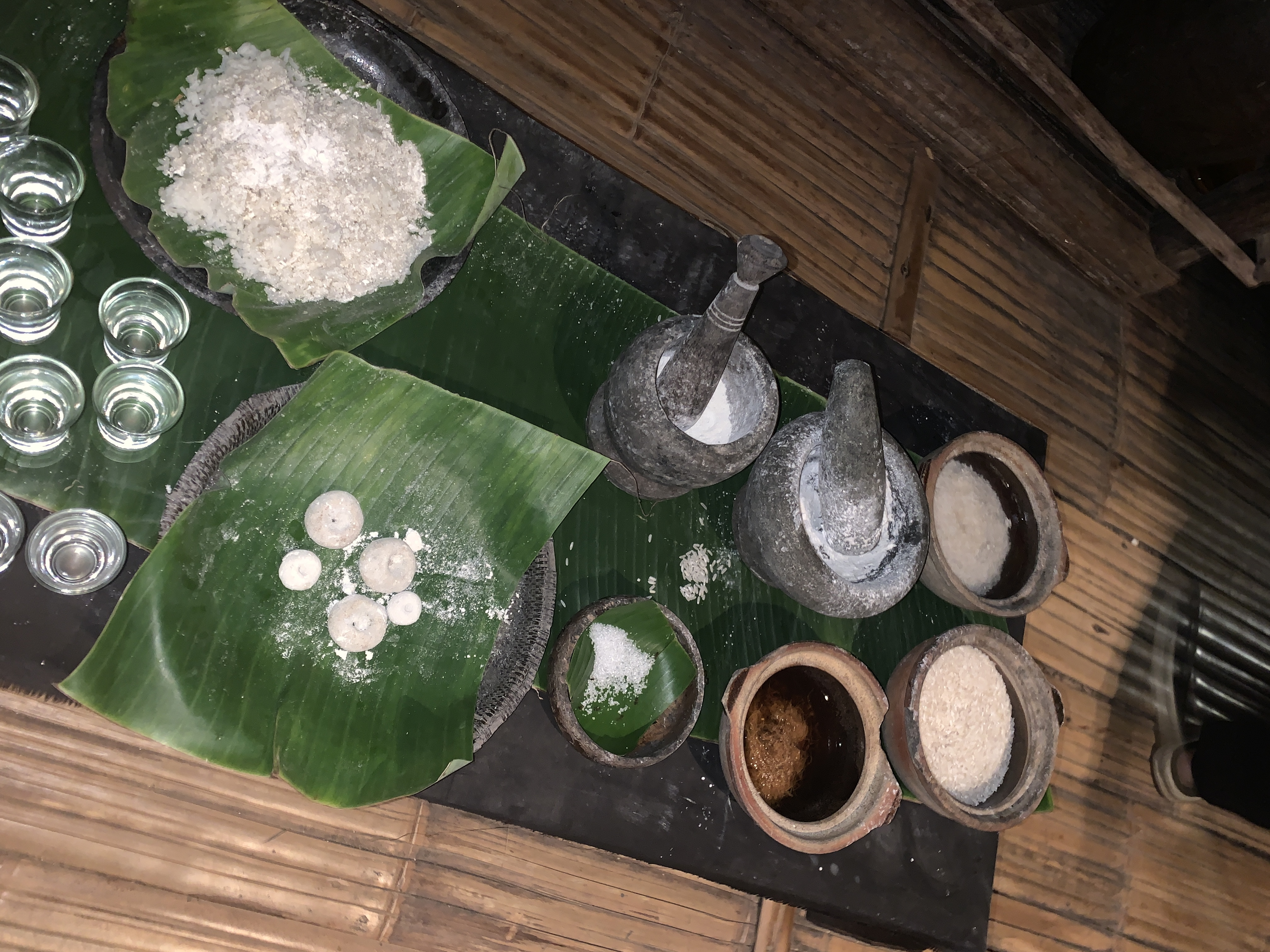
Clockwise from upper right are some of the traditional Kadazan-Dusun cuisines: linopot, traditional hill rice dish (often mixed with yam or sweet potato) tightly wrapped in large/fragrant leaves (such as Terminalia catappa (doringin), Artocarpus odoratissimus (tarap) or banana leaves) to retain moisture and aroma; the preparation and ingredients of lihing, a traditional rice wine; pinaasakan on the right; and the hinava (picked Spanish mackerel combined with red chillies, shredded ginger, sliced shallots and drenched with lime juice)

Oryza sativa (Asian cultivated rice or commonly called parai among the Tambunan Dusuns) is a staple food for the Kadazan-Dusun indigenous community. The various Dusun sub-ethnics are known for their variety of traditional dishes based on each of the subgroups, with the cuisine infused with traditional herbs commonly known among the community. The well known traditional foods of the Dusunic are linopot (meal of cooked hill rice mashed with root vegetables and wrapped in a Terminalia catappa (doringin), Artocarpus odoratissimus (tarap) or banana leaves), the hinava tongii (picked Spanish mackerel combined with red chillies, shredded ginger, sliced shallots and drenched with lime juice) are especially common among the Kadazans of Penampang, the bosou, noonsom or tinamba (Pangi fruit pickled) are popular among the Dusuns of Ranau, the pinaasakan sada or sada pinarasakan (boiled stir-fry mackerel scad fish, popular among Ranau, Kundasang, Bundu Tuhan, Beluran and Sandakan Dusuns), the hininggazang and pinompol, or pinompo, a snack made from sago flour with sliced bananas, grated coconut and sugar; are common among the Kadazans of Papar, the kombos rice, a traditional coconut rice dish from the Lotud Dusun of Tuaran, which is a staple among the community households, while another dish with a similar name, the kombos tapai, is popular among the Dusuns of Kota Belud, including those from Labuk and Beluran. The triangular-shaped tinimbu (also called tinimbuh) dumpling made from glutinous rice are common among the Tatana Dusun of Kuala Penyu. Various mushrooms, such as the kodop (Schizophyllum commune), sawit or palm oil mushroom (Volvariella volvacea), tiram (Pleurotus spp.), korong (Auricularia spp.), and Marasmiellus species, were mostly consumed by the Kadazan-Dusun and other indigenous people of Sabah as part of their daily diet. Losun, a wild spring onions of Borneo common among the Dusuns, is usually paired with linopot and hinava or anchovies. The Nanggiu is a refreshing traditional treat of Kadazan sweet dessert, close to Malay air batu campur (ABC), cendol, Filipino samalamig and Vietnamese chè thái with the dessert is made from sago pearls cooked in sweet coconut milk with fragrant pandan leaves. The penyaram snack (known as sinisiung among the Kadazan) are also shared with other Sabah indigenous.

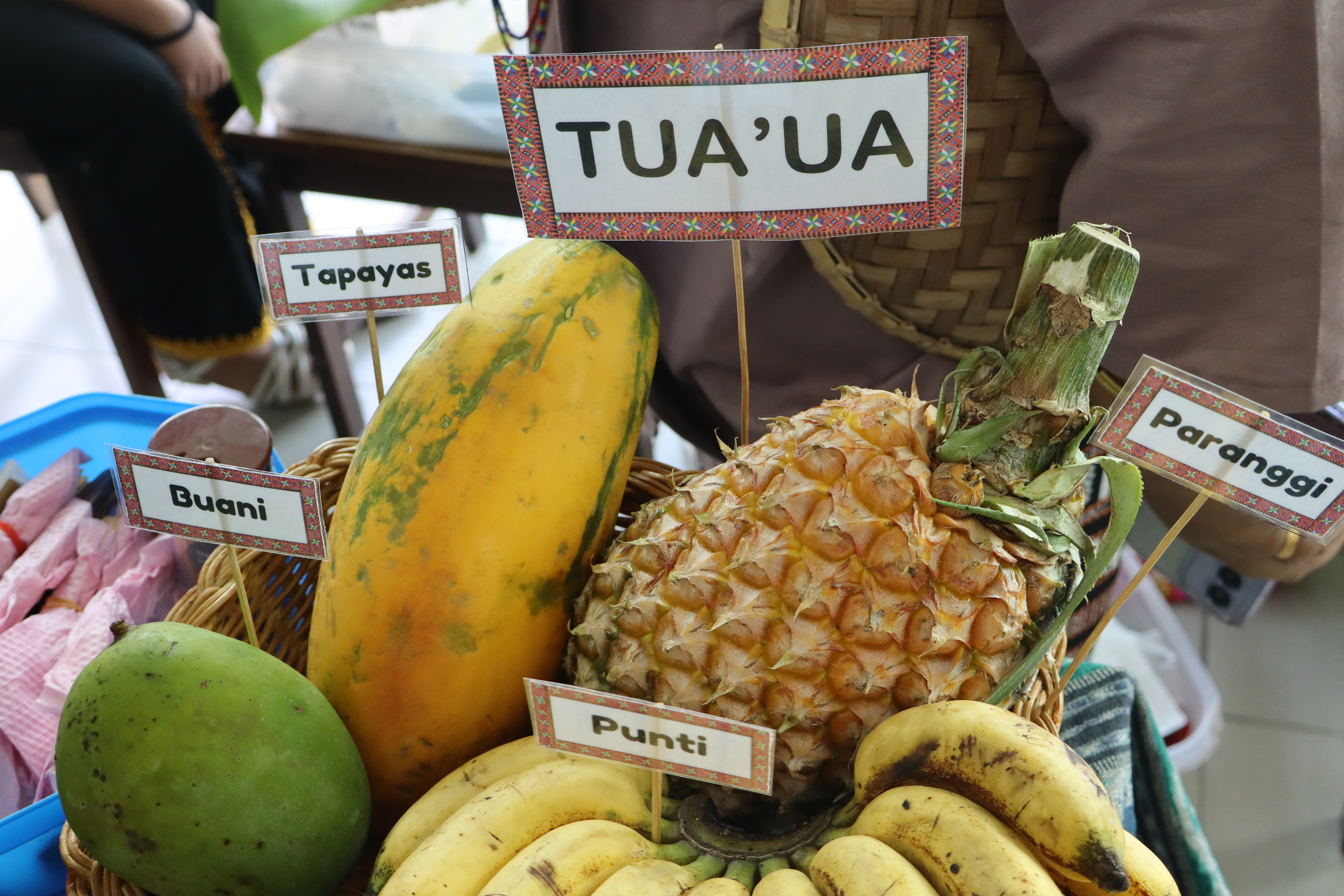
Various fruits (crop yield) of the Kadazan-Dusun in native language

The white linabok (leaf rice) is common among the Liwan Dusun, together with their linatok do mundok (boiled cassava) and soko om tuntui (boiled bamboo shoots and steamed banana flower), among others. The tombowtong kiningkinan (special herb dishes) and taduk vegetable (araceae sheath) are common among the Tindal Dusun of Kota Belud, while the Kimaragang Dusun are known for their gisak or gisakan soup (cow or buffalo intestine soup) and tonsom (rice or old corn that is ground and fried without oil, or can also use cassava, fish and banana stems). The Kadazan-Dusun are further known by their bambangan pickle or noonsom bambangan (Mangifera pajang, a brown wild mango grown in the jungle of Borneo), tuhau, also called noonsom tuhau (Etlingera coccinea, a tangy wild ginger condiment served in dishes like pickled tuhau, popular among the Dusuns of Keningau, Ranau, and Tambunan), and noonsom sada (freshwater fish fermented with rice, salt, and the contents of the pangi fruit). The most common traditional alcoholic drinks of the Kadazan-Dusun are tapai, tumpung or segantang, lihing, montoku, and bahar. Ambuyat is another staple of the Kadazan-Dusun, where it is usually served with pinaasakan and bambangan. Several traditional soups, including the sup terjun (jumping soup), gorouk soup (winter melon soup), kinoring soup (meat of a wild boar usually referred to by the locals as sinalau bakas), and manuk lihing soup (rice wine chicken soup) were also part of the ethnic cusine. The popular roadside smoked meat of the Kadazan-Dusun of sinalau are common in Sabah, and an exotic food of the Kadazan-Dusun known as butod (Rhynchophorus vulneratus) is commonly served during their festivals, with recent modern infusions mixed sushi and pizza served within Kadazan-Dusun restaurants and coffeehouses around Sabah. It is also part of the pusas snacks among the Kadazan-Dusun that are frequently served with alcoholic drinks. Apart from the bambangan, the tarap fruit (Artocarpus odoratissimus) are also the common fruit delicacy among the Kadazan-Dusun people.

=== Handicrafts ===
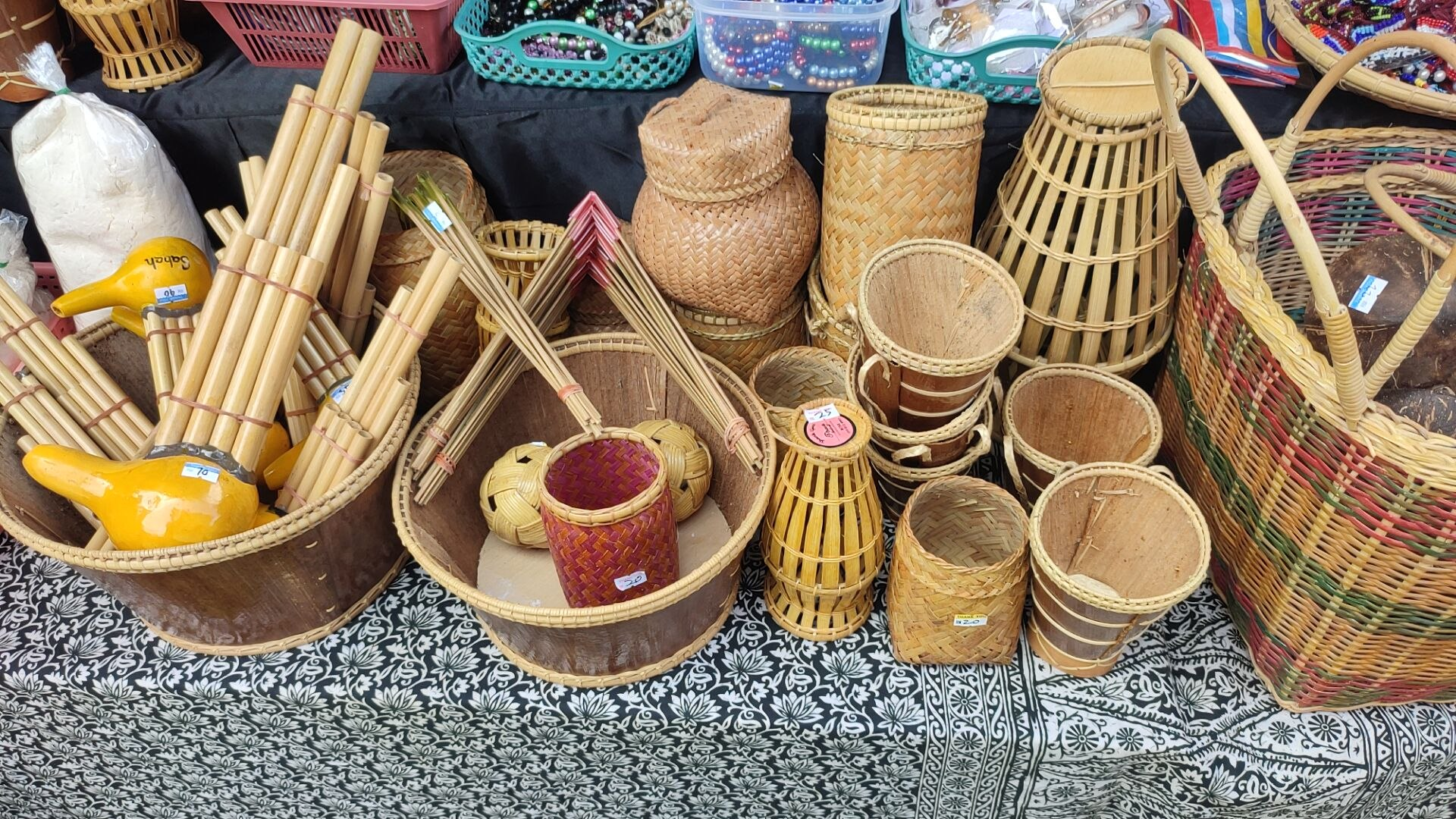
Various handicrafts, including musical instrument

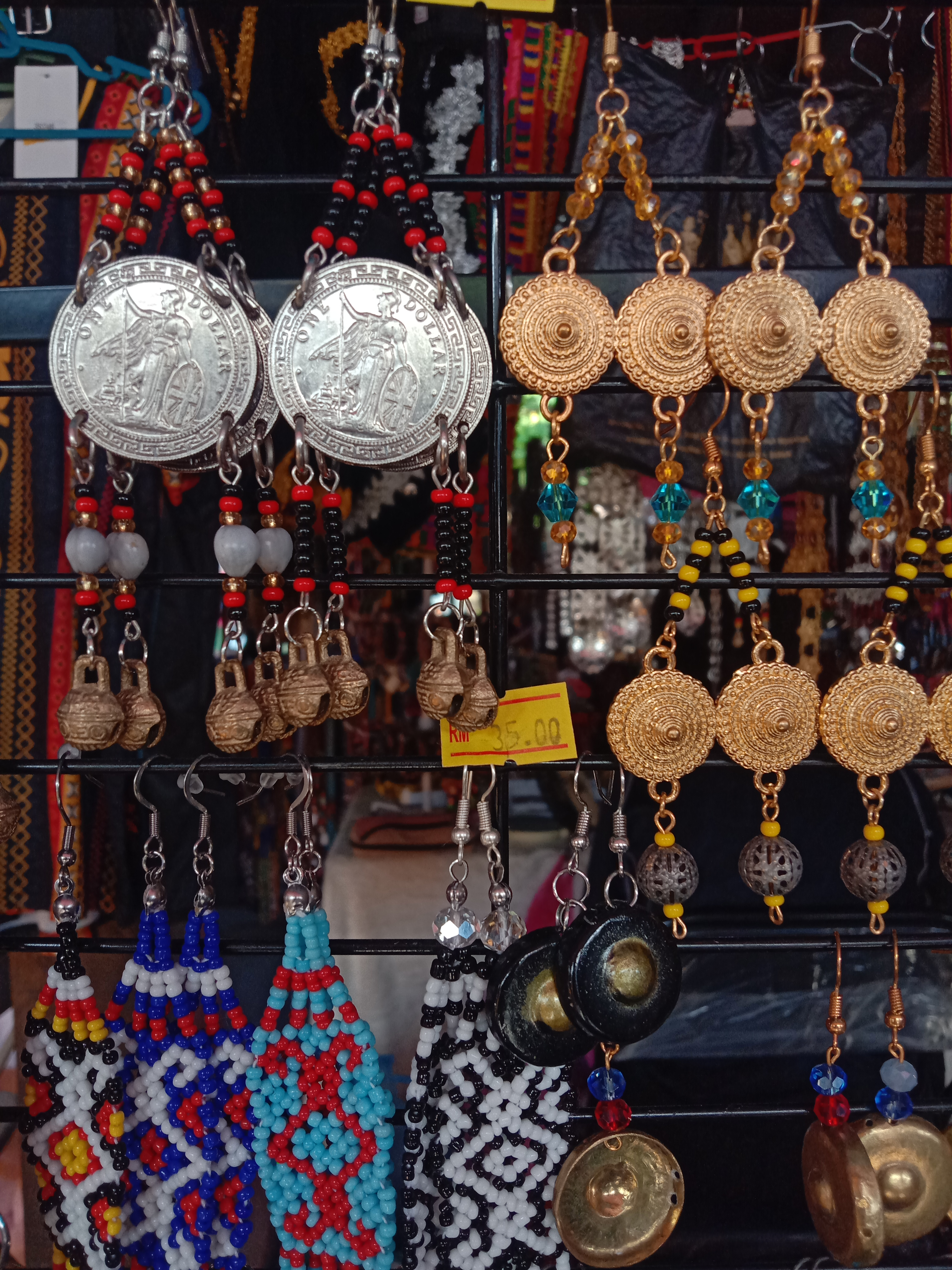
Traditional accessories

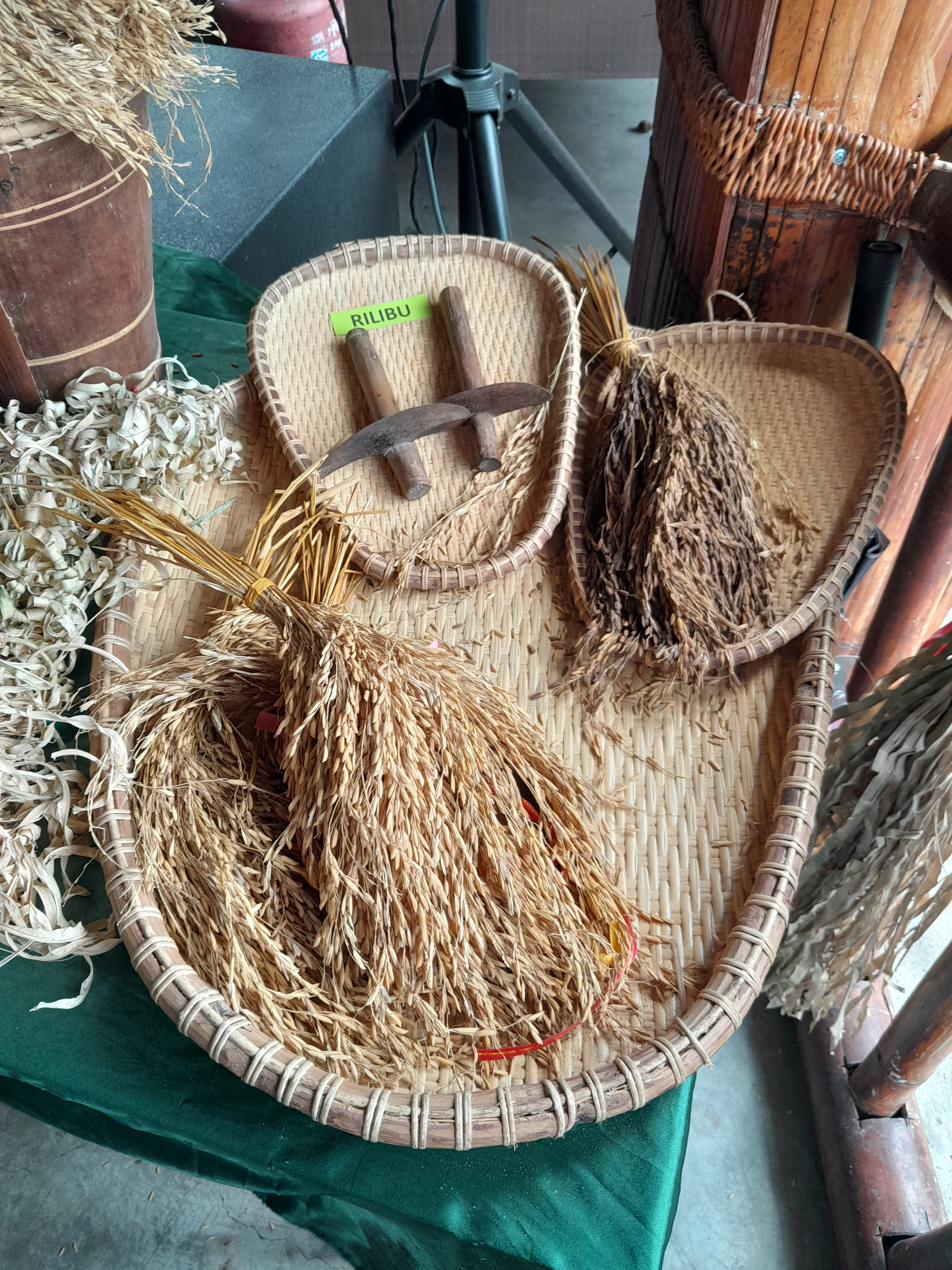
The rilibu (winnowing tray)

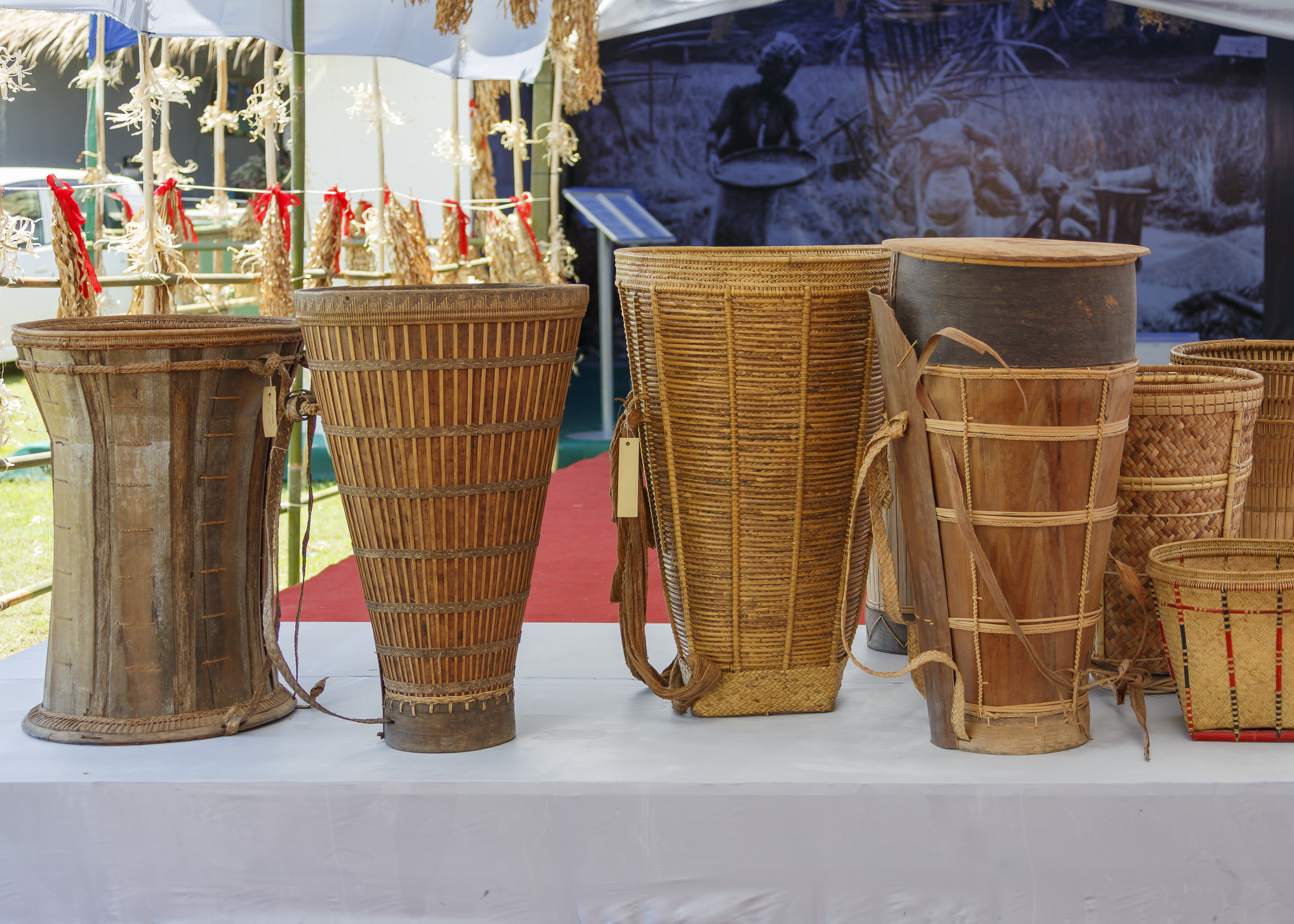
Various types of baskets based on different subgroups

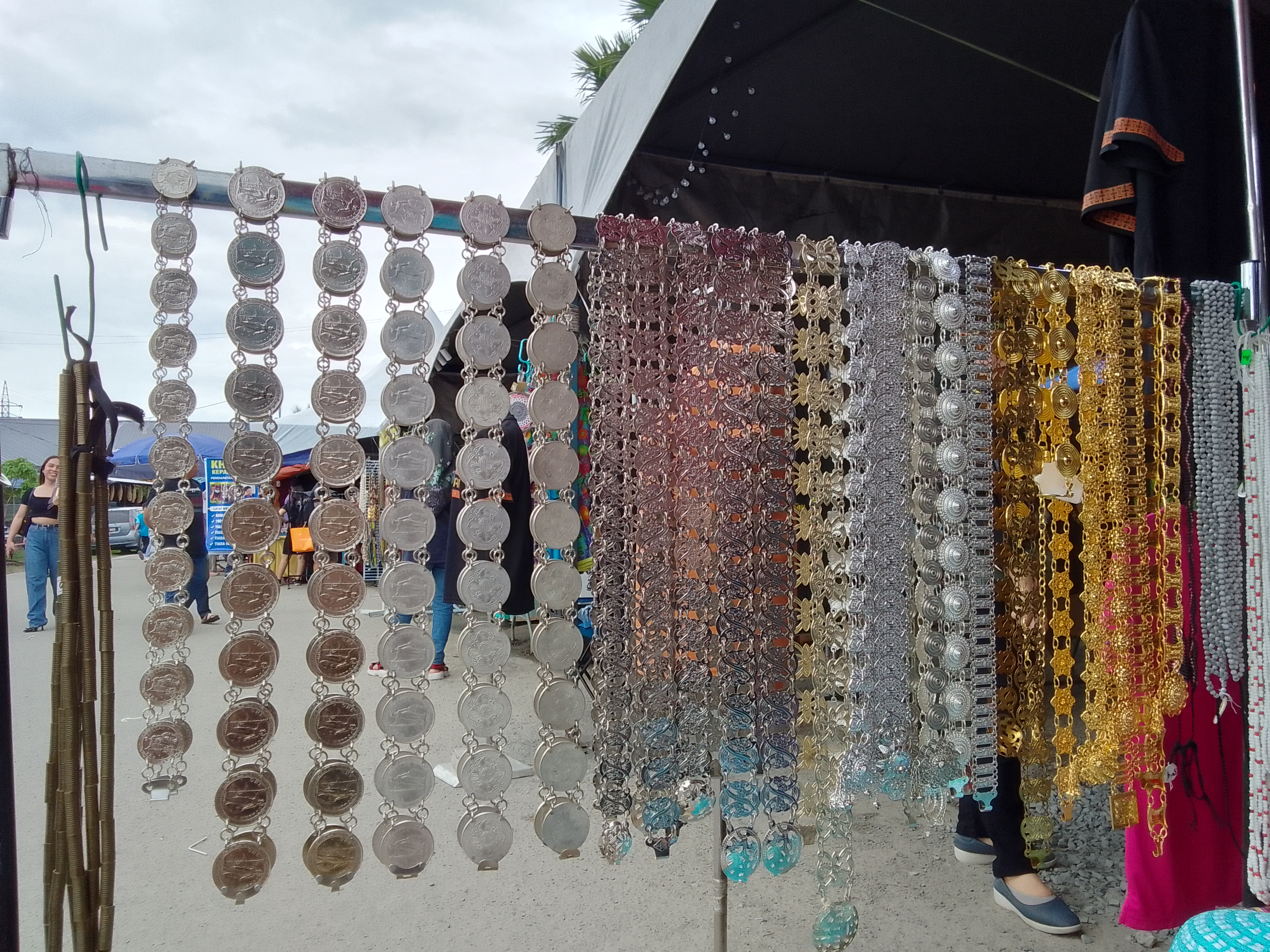
Waist accessories, the himpogot

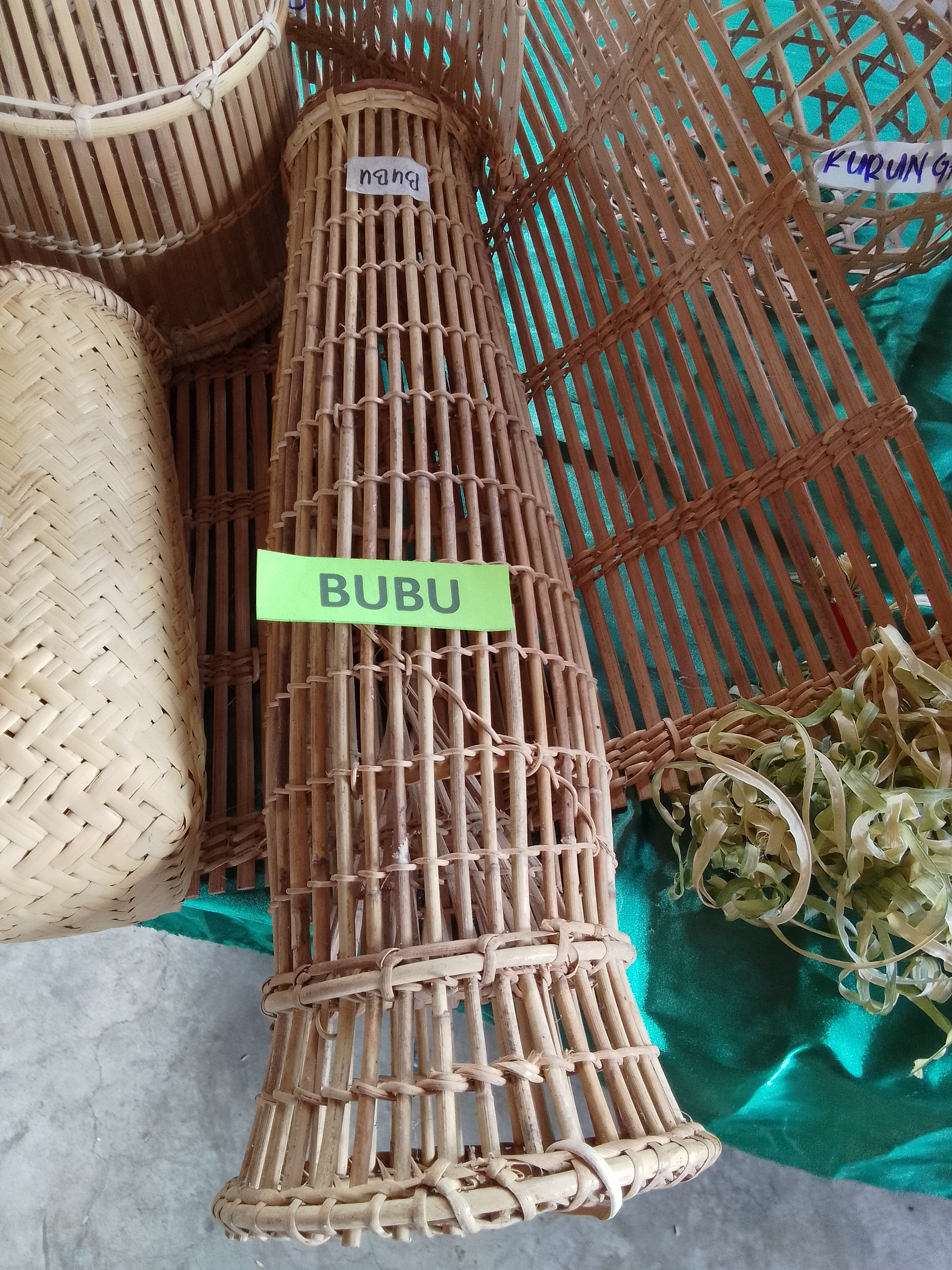
The bubu is used to catch fishes

Natural materials are used by the Kadazan-Dusun people as resources in the production of various tinunturu (handicrafts), including bamboo, rattan, donax canniformis (bemban or lias), calabash, and wood. Some of the handicrafts that are synonym to the Kadazan-Dusun people are barait/basung/wakid (traditional bag), siung hat, sompoton (mouth organ), paddy cutter linggaman, gayang (parang machete), and the Rungus pinakol. Before the mentioned handicrafts were promoted and commercialised to represent the Kadazan-Dusun cultures, it is the common tools that were used in daily lives of the indigenous, with some of these handicrafts are still used for its original purpose to this day. Wakid and barait are used to carry harvested crops from farms, sompoton is a musical instrument, pinakol is an accessory used in ceremonials and rituals. Parang/machetes, gayang/swords, tandus (a kind of spear) and blowpipe are used as farming and hunting tools, as well as weapons in series of civil wars of the Kadazan-Dusun past, including their headhunting. Some of the baskets were also used in the past by indigenous men to hold human heads that were being hunted, while women carried very large baskets to fill with forest produce harvested in the fields. Other handicrafts of the Kadazan-Dusun, especially the tajau (pottery), were used in the past as coffins, apart from wedding and ritual ceremonies, such as by the Tindal Dusun of Kota Belud.

The paddy cutters of linggaman are common among the Dusuns of Tuaran, the Lotud and Tindal Dusuns, where they were used aside from sickles until modern times. The bubu is another Dusun traditional equipment and handicraft used to catch freshwater fishes. Rilibu (winnowing tray) are common among the Kimaragang Dusun, made from high-quality rotan lilin (Calamus penicillatus Roxb. rattan species). Bamboo plays a major part in most of the traditional daily items and utensils of the Kadazan-Dusun due to its abundance as a building material and raw material for all sorts of daily implements, from cooking containers to ceremonial knives made from the resources with different species such as the Schizostachyum brachycladum (ugading/rugading), Gigantochloa levis (poing/poring), Gigantochloa balui (bahui/malui), Schizostachyum lima (humbising/sumbiling), Schizostachyum brachycladum (wulu/tulu), Schizostachyum brachycladum (tombotuon/tombotuong), Dinochloa trichogona (wadan), Bambusa blumeana (tongkungon), and Schizostachyum pilosum (lampaki) among others. The himpogot (silver dollar belts) are special waist accessories for Kadazan-Dusun females, antique family heirlooms passed from a mother to daughters, with the coin belt (tinggot) is made from silver dollar coins of the early 20th century.

=== Traditional attire ===
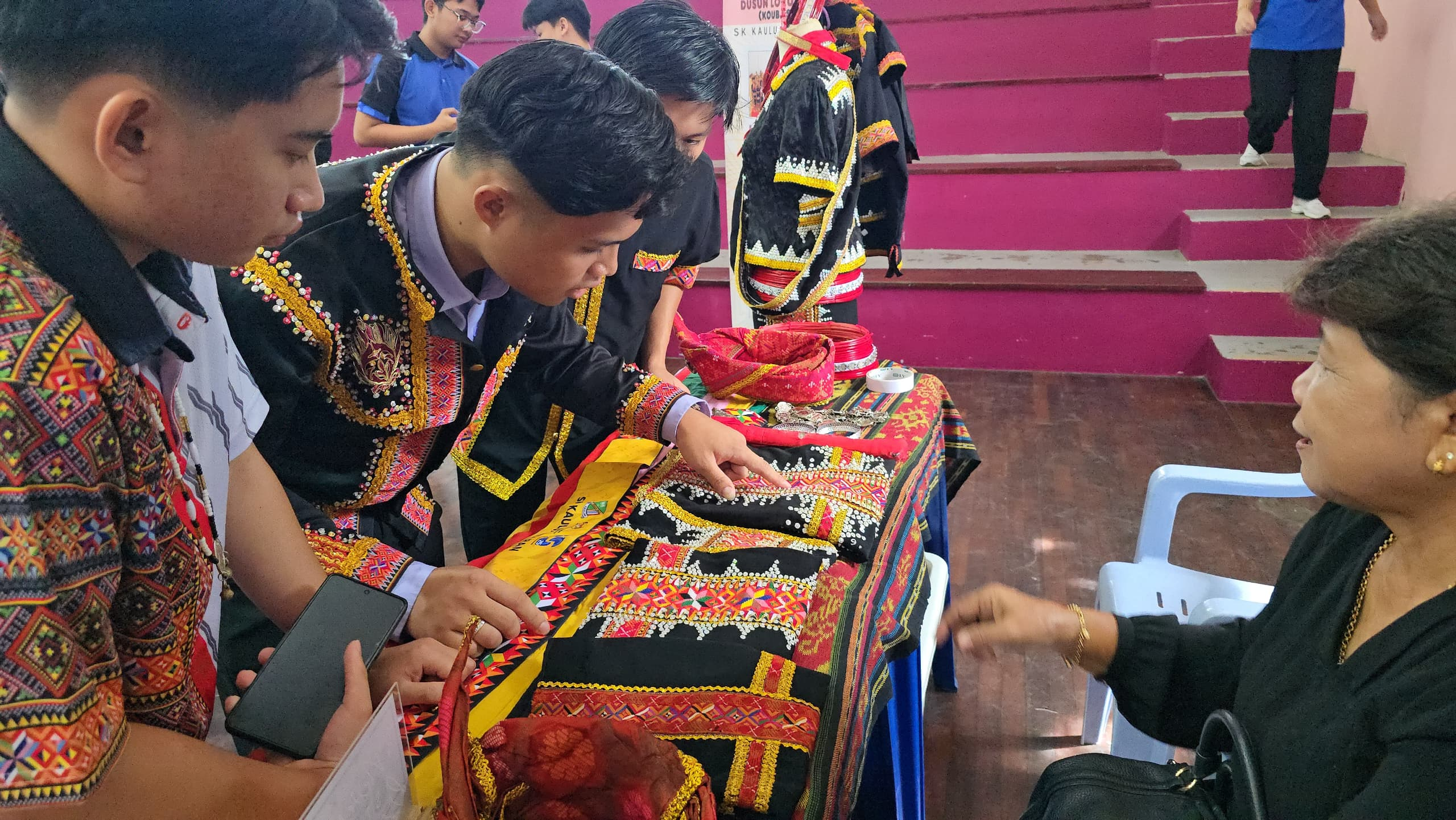
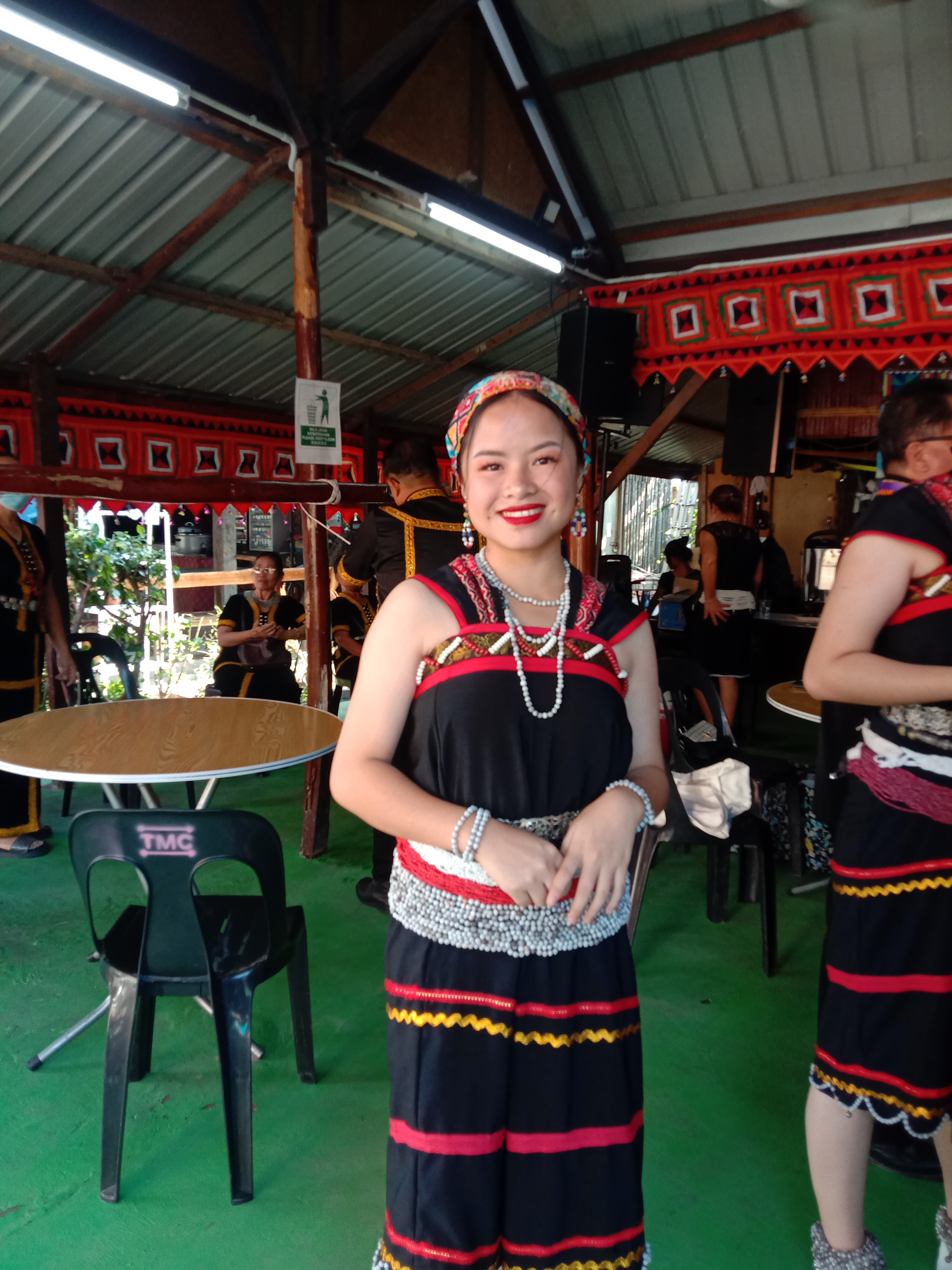
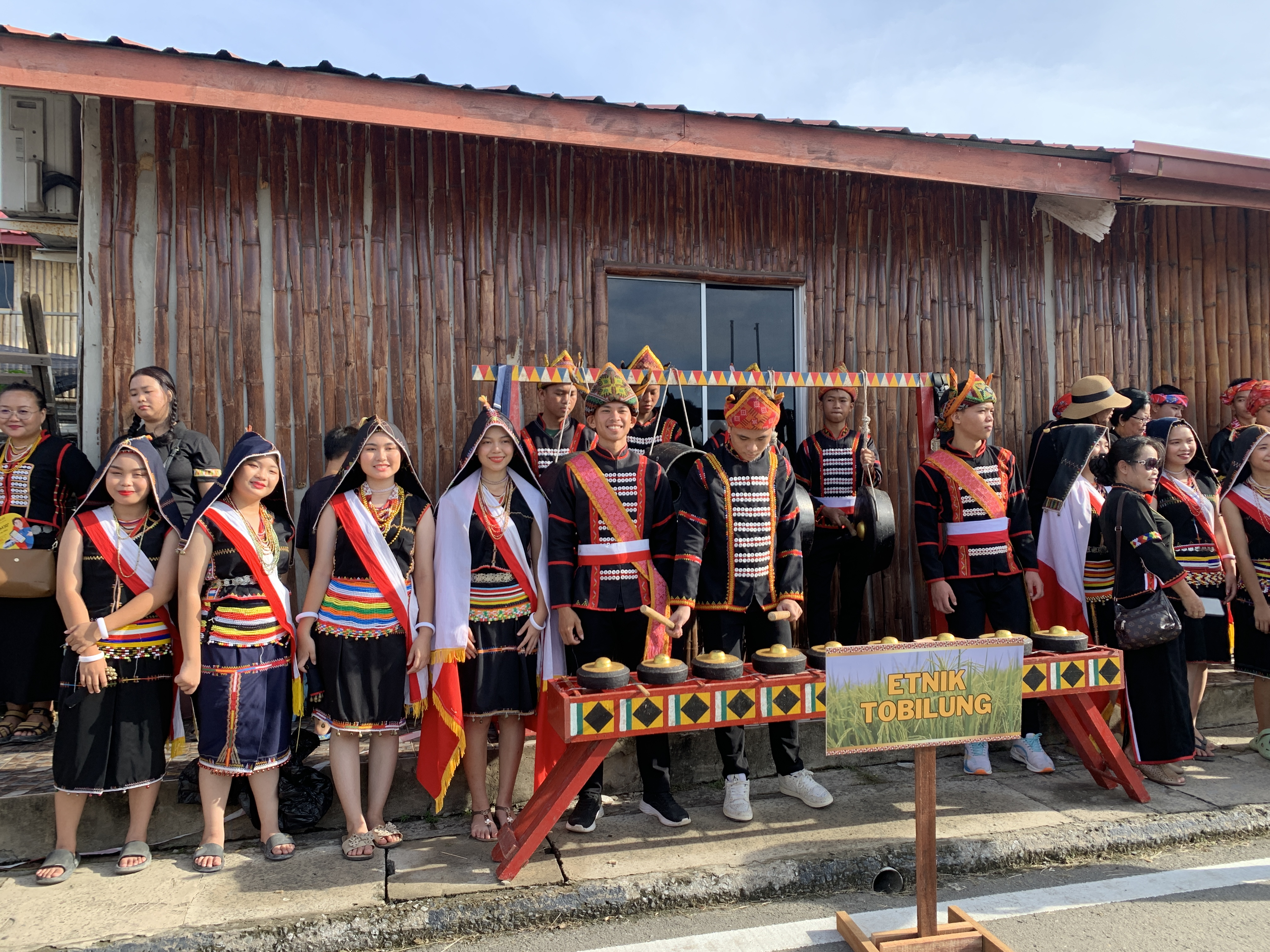
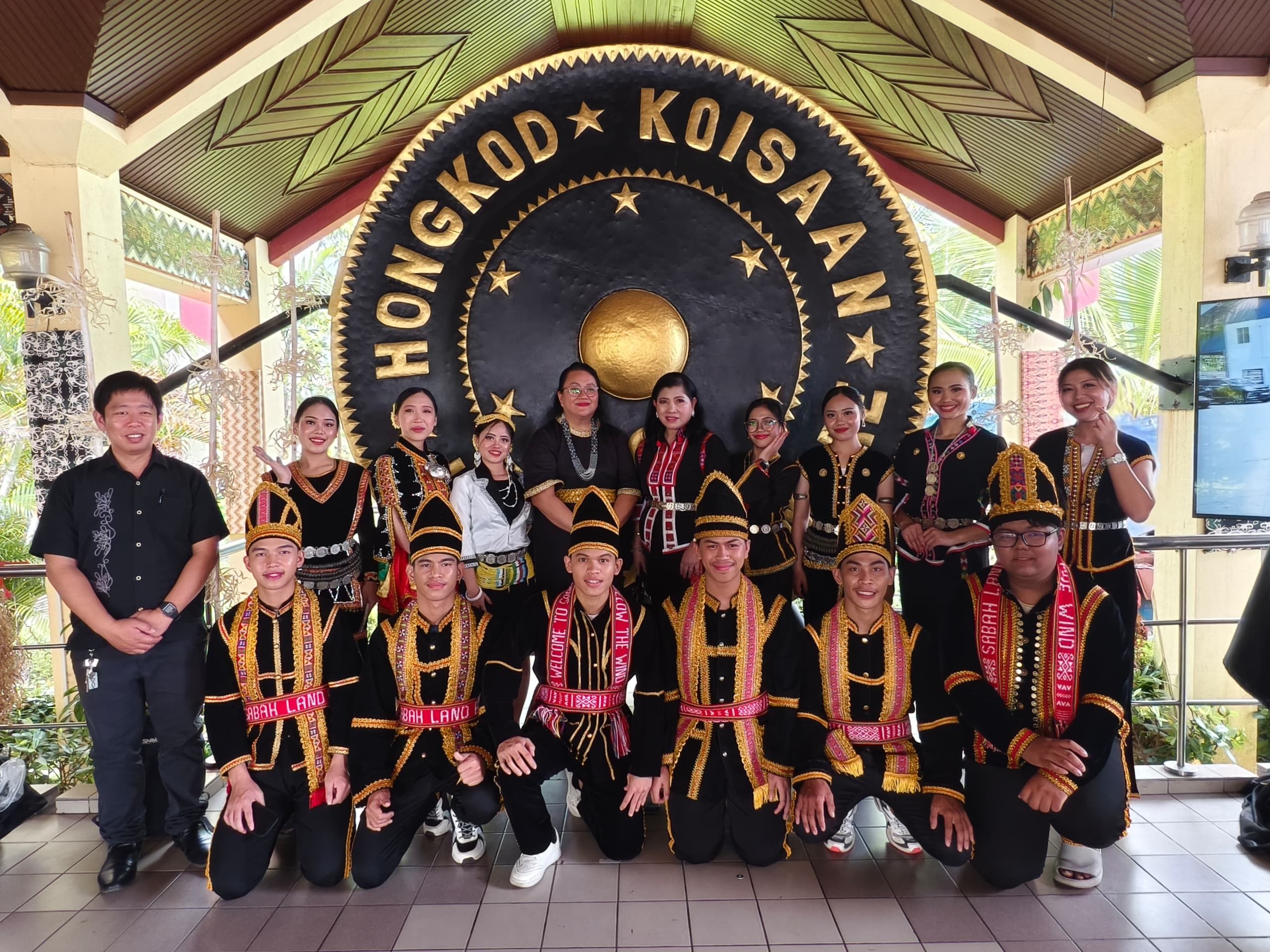
Traditional attire of the Kadazan-Dusun. Clockwise from upper right: a Tindal Dusun female wearing the kapa momorun; a Kadazan-Dusun group portrait with a Lundayeh female (white dress) at Hongkod Koisaan; a Tobilung Dusun group portrait; and younger Kadazan-Dusun generations learning the detail and patterns of the Lotud Dusun ethnic attire

The traditional costume of the Kadazan-Dusun is varied according to each subgroup. Black colour are synonyms among the ethnics, similarly to the Bisaya, Muruts, and Rungus. The practice of wearing a sunduk or sinurundoi (veil) for female as a cover from sunlight and as a symbol of beauty and femininity during wedding ceremonies are common among the Liwan, Tagahas, Tindal and Tobilung Dusuns, and by the bobolian during ritual ceremonies. The Kimaragang Dusun traditional dress is kinaling with a black colour and colourful sashes made of silver and rattan, especially for the Pitas-Koromoko Kimaragang, while the Kota Marudu-Tandek Kimaragang have their lapoi and sinudot. The Liwan traditional dress is garung lapoi for males, although the fabric of lapoi may also be used by females, the sinombiaka rombituon is the main female attire commonly worn during various ethnic ceremonies, including for their weddings, which is usually paired with the sunduk veil. The Tindal Dusun has a unique traditional clothing design, known as sinuranga (male) and rinagang (female). Another traditional Tindal dress for the female is the sinipak, which is more synonymous among the Tindal Dusun who inhabit lower land areas, while the rinagang is popular among those who live in hilly or upper land areas. Both are worn together with the sunduk and come in black colour with colourful patterns, decorations and motifs, with the sinipak also coming in a version for males.

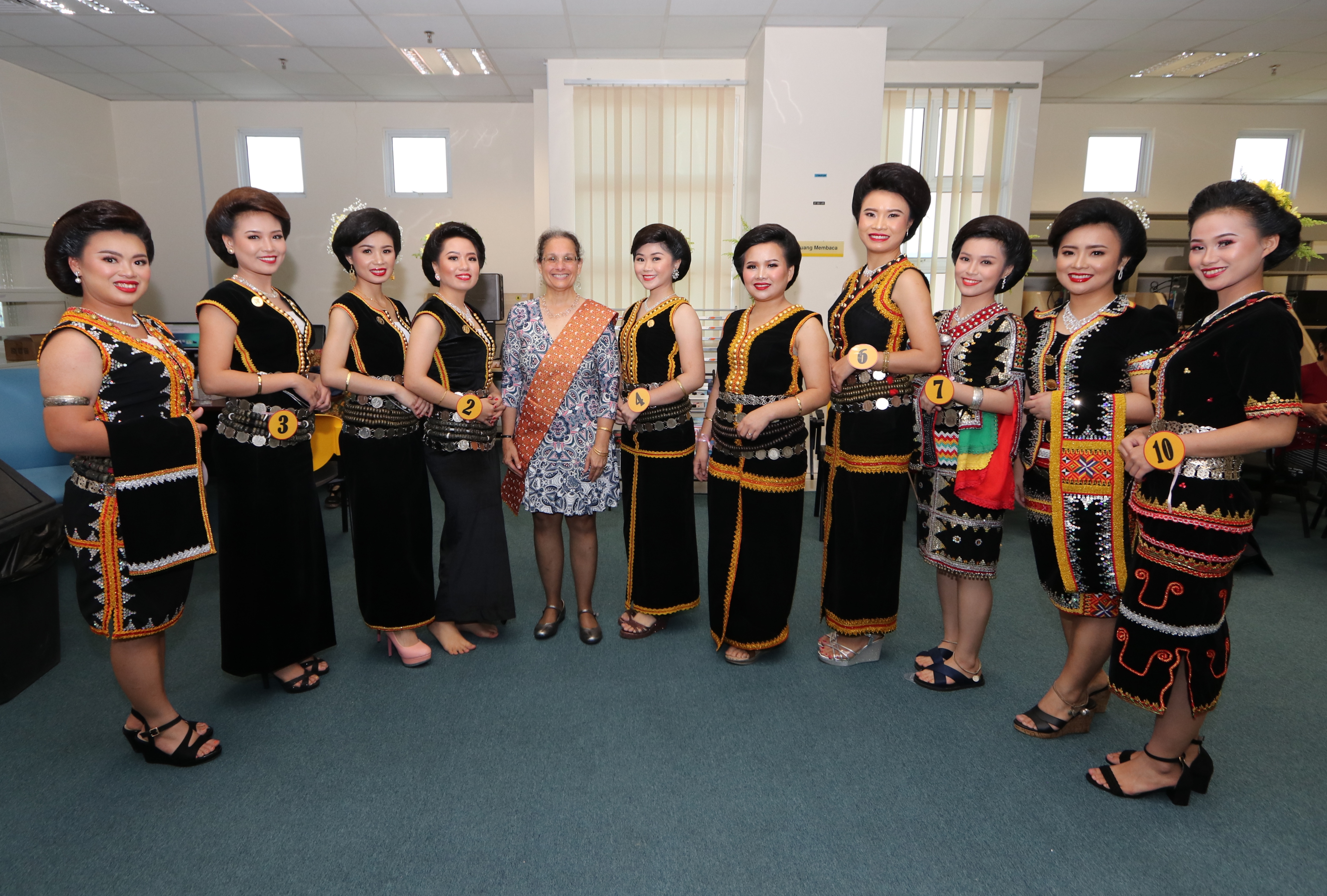
US ambassador Kamala Shirin Lakhdhir with Kaamatan pageants in their respective attire, 2019

The Lotud Dusun are known for their linangkit embroidery, a geometric motifs produced based on embroidery techniques with the design and decoration dominates the gonob and kuluwu decorations in Lotud traditional clothing. It is characterised by geometric shapes dominated by triangles and squares, with the use of bright colours such as red, yellow, black, green and white to fill each of the geometric shapes formed into a variety of patterns. Among the Kadazans of Penampang, the males wear the gaung (long-sleeved shirt without embroidery, although modern designs are decorated with gold trimming and gold buttons), and the females wear the sinuangga' (blouse with short sleeves and a U-neck worn by younger female). The decorations and designs are also varied by region, such as, for example, the dress design for Kadazan female of Penampang usually comes in a set of sleeveless blouses combined with long skirts and no hats, while the dress design for Kadazan female of Papar comes in a set of long-sleeved blouses combined with knee-length skirts and is worn with a siung hat.

=== Traditional dance ===
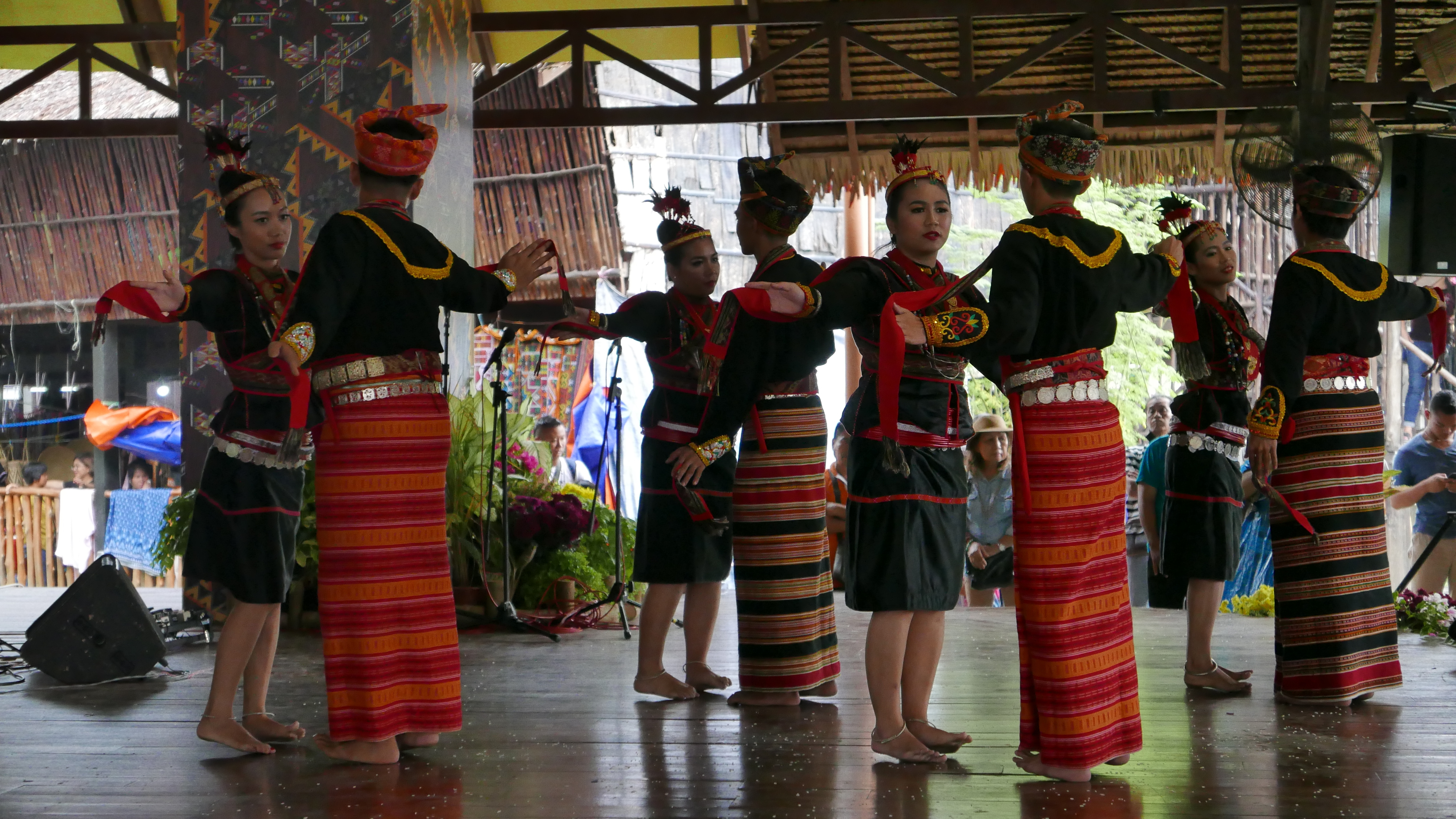
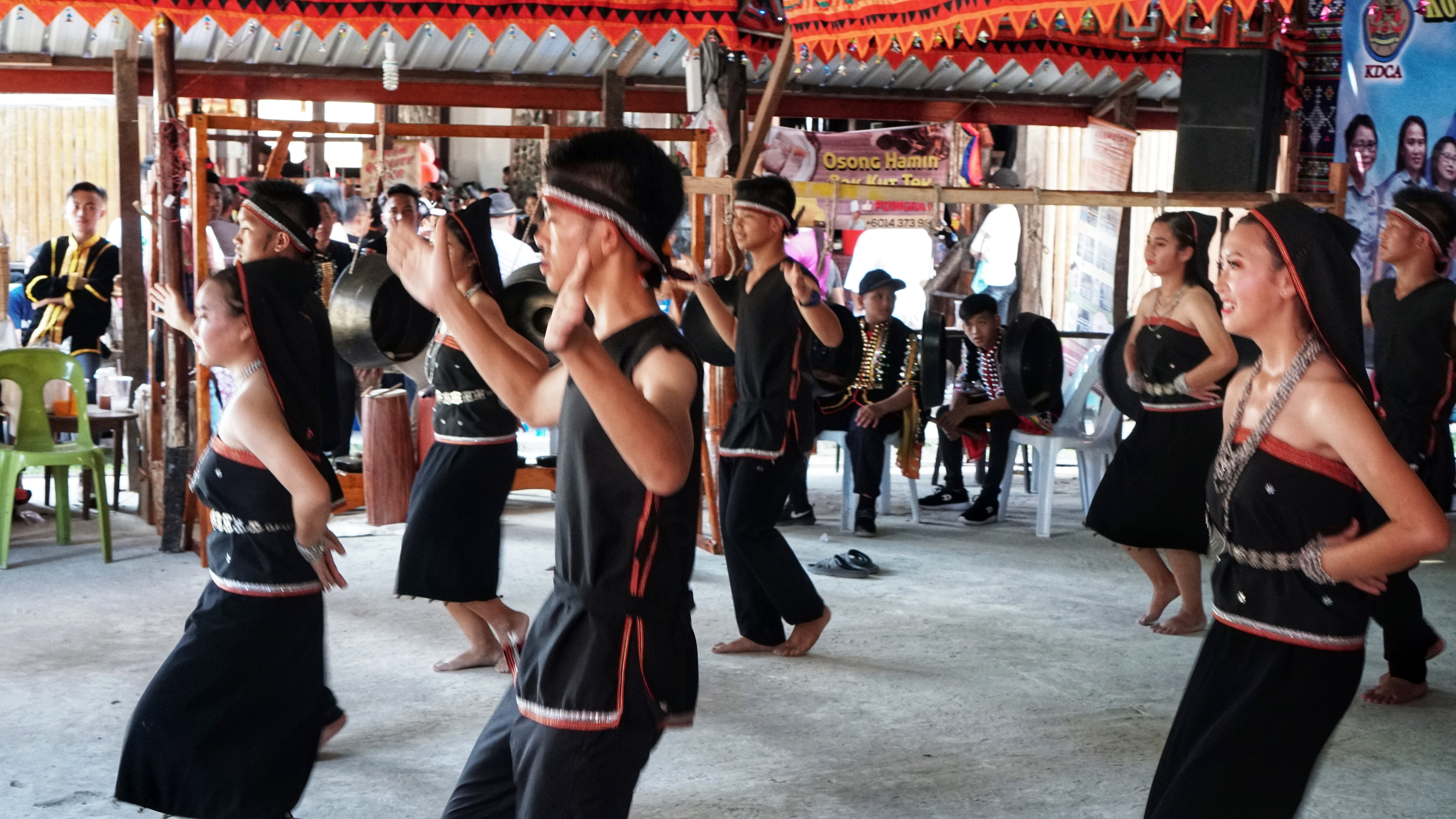
From left to right: Lotud Dusun traditional dance of sumayau and Liwan Dusun dance of sumirid medtemu

The ethnic dance among the different Kadazan-Dusun tribes is divided into several different ethnic dances. The Sumazau is the main ethnic dance among the Penampang Kadazan, where it is known as sazau among the Papar Kadazan and sumayau among the Dusuns. The dance is performed by a pair of men and women dancers wearing traditional Kadazan attire, accompanied by the beats and rhythms of seven to eight gongs. Its opening movement is the parallel swing of the arms back and forth at the sides of the body, while the feet spring and move the body from left to right. With the opening dance moves integrated with the gong beats and rhythms, the male dancer will give a signal (mamangkis), indicating that it is time to change the movement pattern. There are several traditional dances associated with the Dusuns based on different subgroups, such as magarang of the Liwan Dusun of Tambunan District, and modtomu sumirid (Kundasang Valley) and sumirid medtemu of the Liwan Dusun of Ranau District, sumirid lohobon of Gobukon Dusun of Kota Marudu District, botumban of Tagahas Dusun of Kiulu, Tuaran District, and pansok manamparai of Tagahas Dusun of Kota Marudu, Papar, and Penampang districts, the pinakang of Kimaragang Dusun of Kota Marudu and Pitas districts, sayau moginum and bakanjar of the Tatana Dusun of Kuala Penyu District, sumayau of the Lotud Dusun of Tuaran District, mongigol rinagang for the Tindal Dusun, and manaradan and mongigol tobilung for Tobilung Dusun of Kota Belud, Kota Marudu and Kota Kinabalu districts, and mongigol mangalai for the Tinagas Dusun of Ranau, Telupid, Beluran, and Kota Marudu districts, magunatip of Kujau (Kwijau) Dusun, mansayau of Nabaai Dusun, and sumayau of Gana Dusun of Keningau District. sirid-sirid, sumirid or sirid karamazan of Minokok Tompizos Dusun of Tongod and Keningau districts, and magalai labuk of Labuk Dusun of Beluran, Ranau, Sandakan and Telupid districts.

=== Traditional music ===
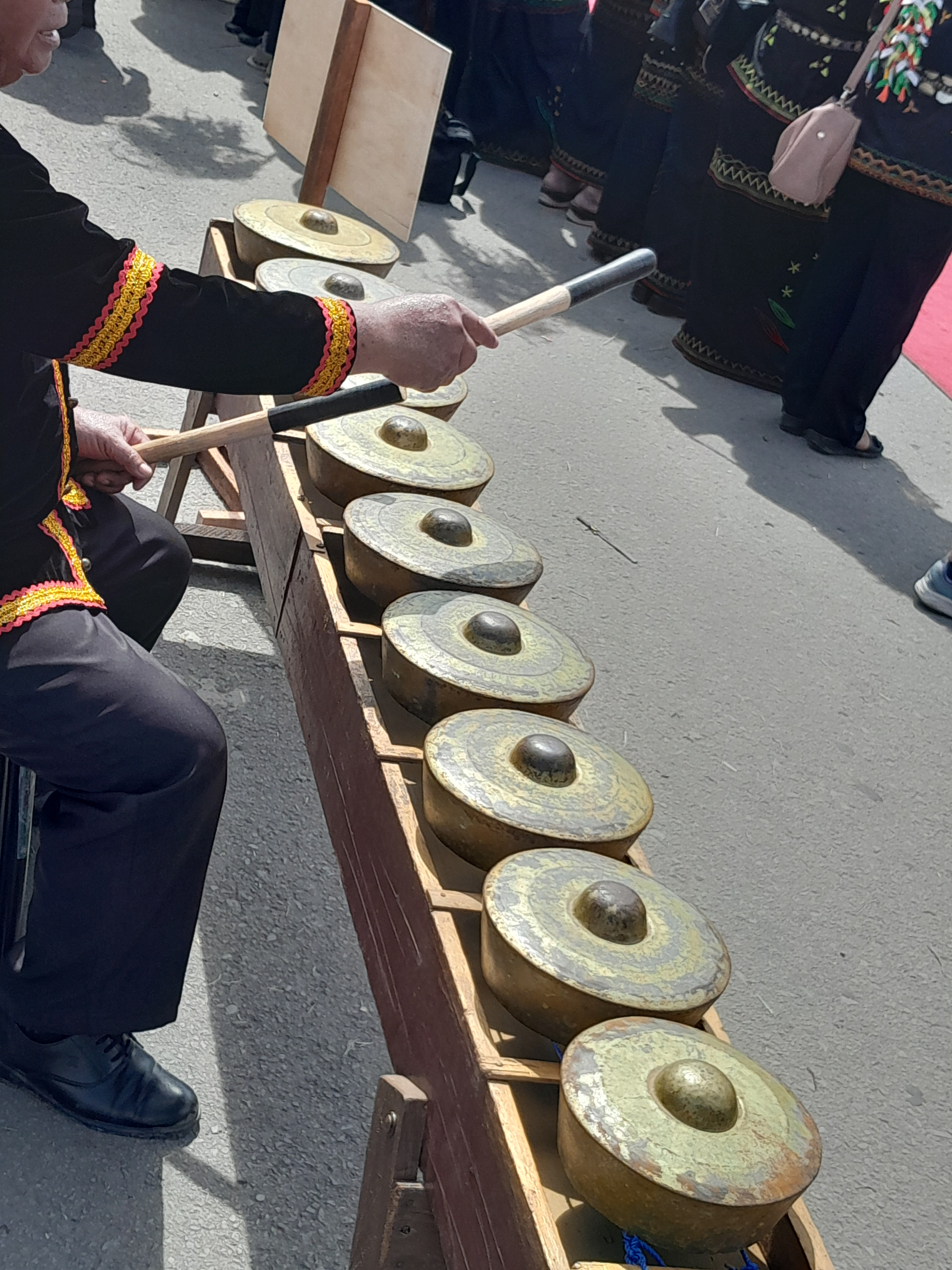
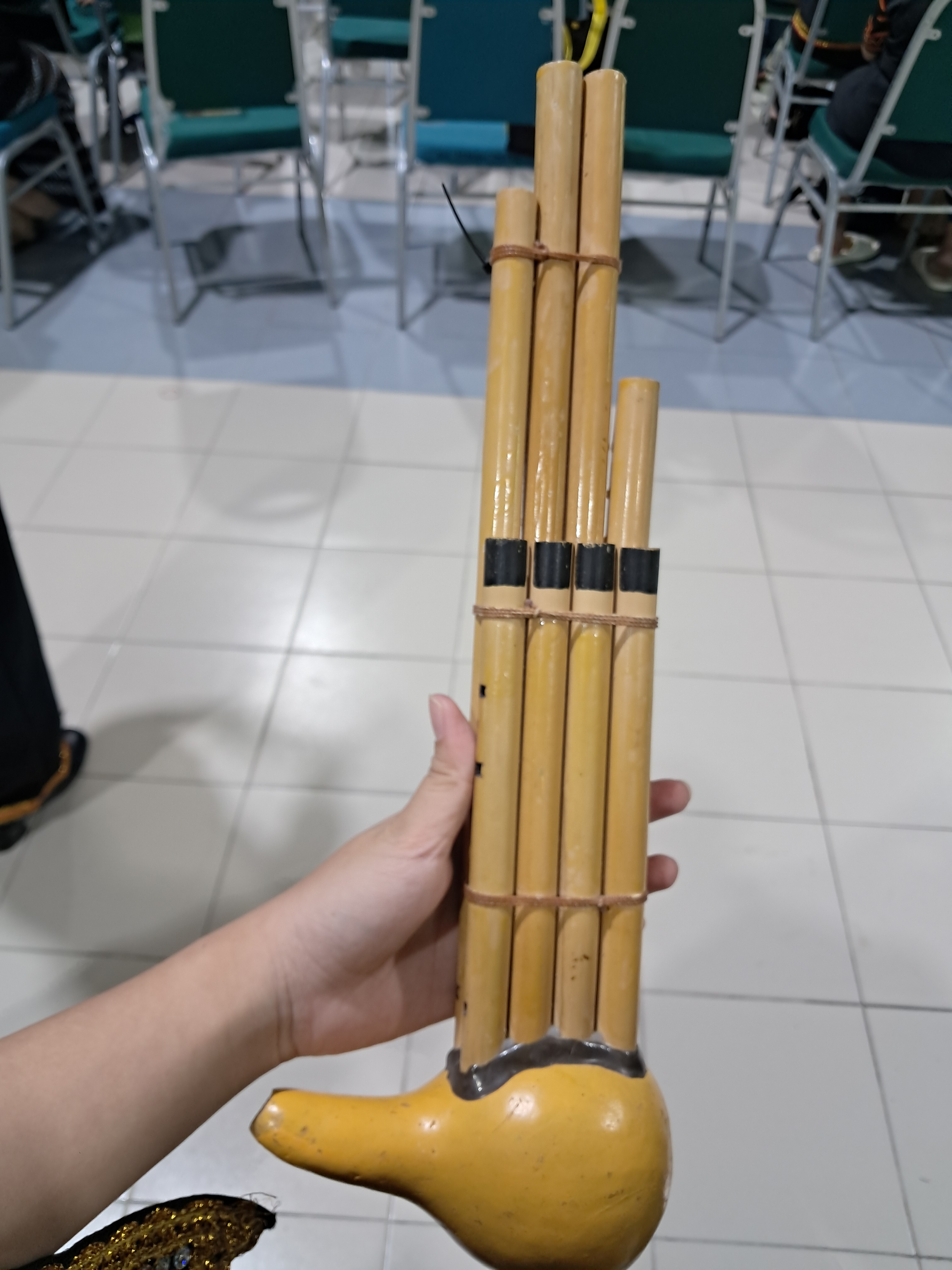
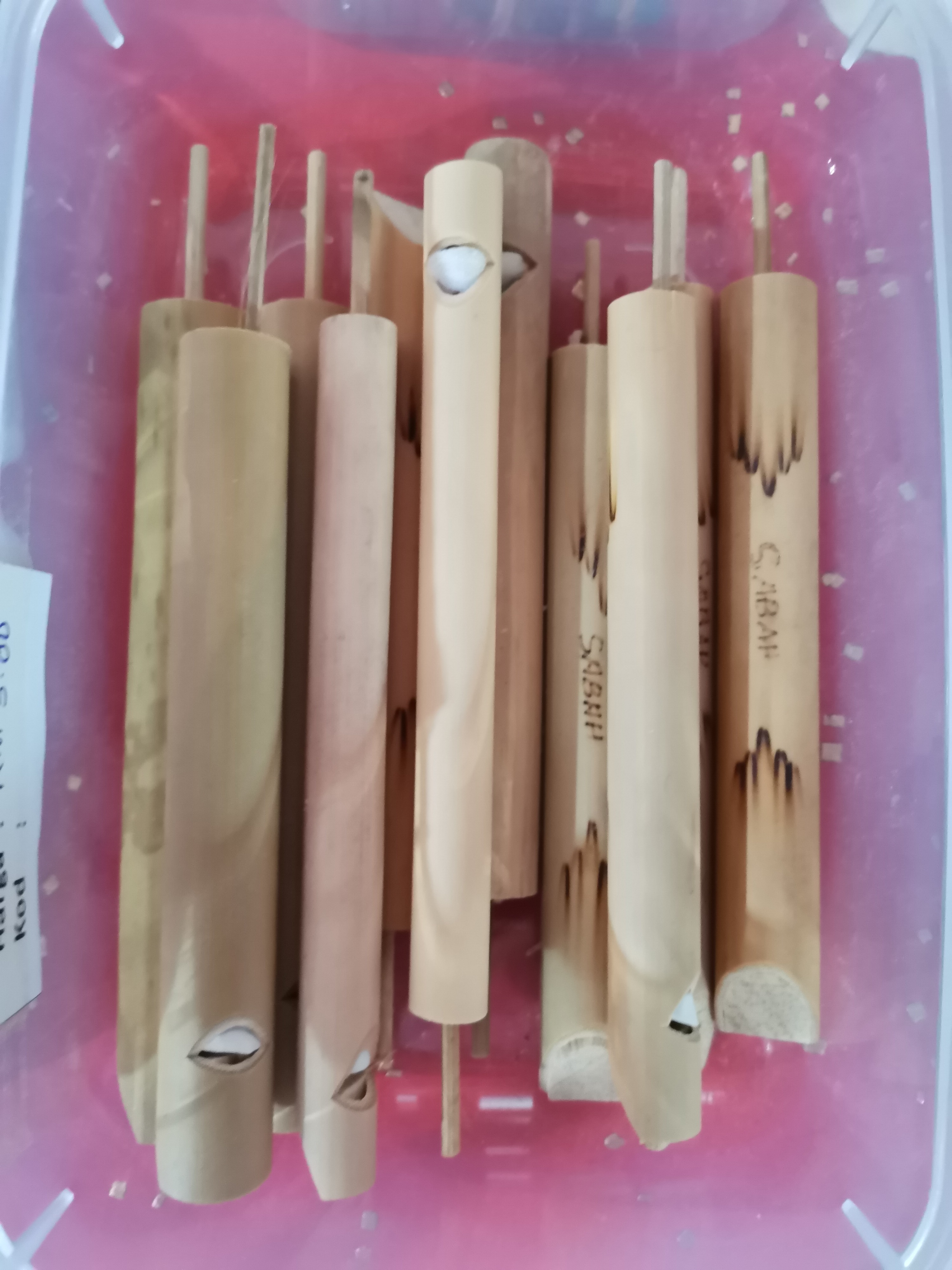
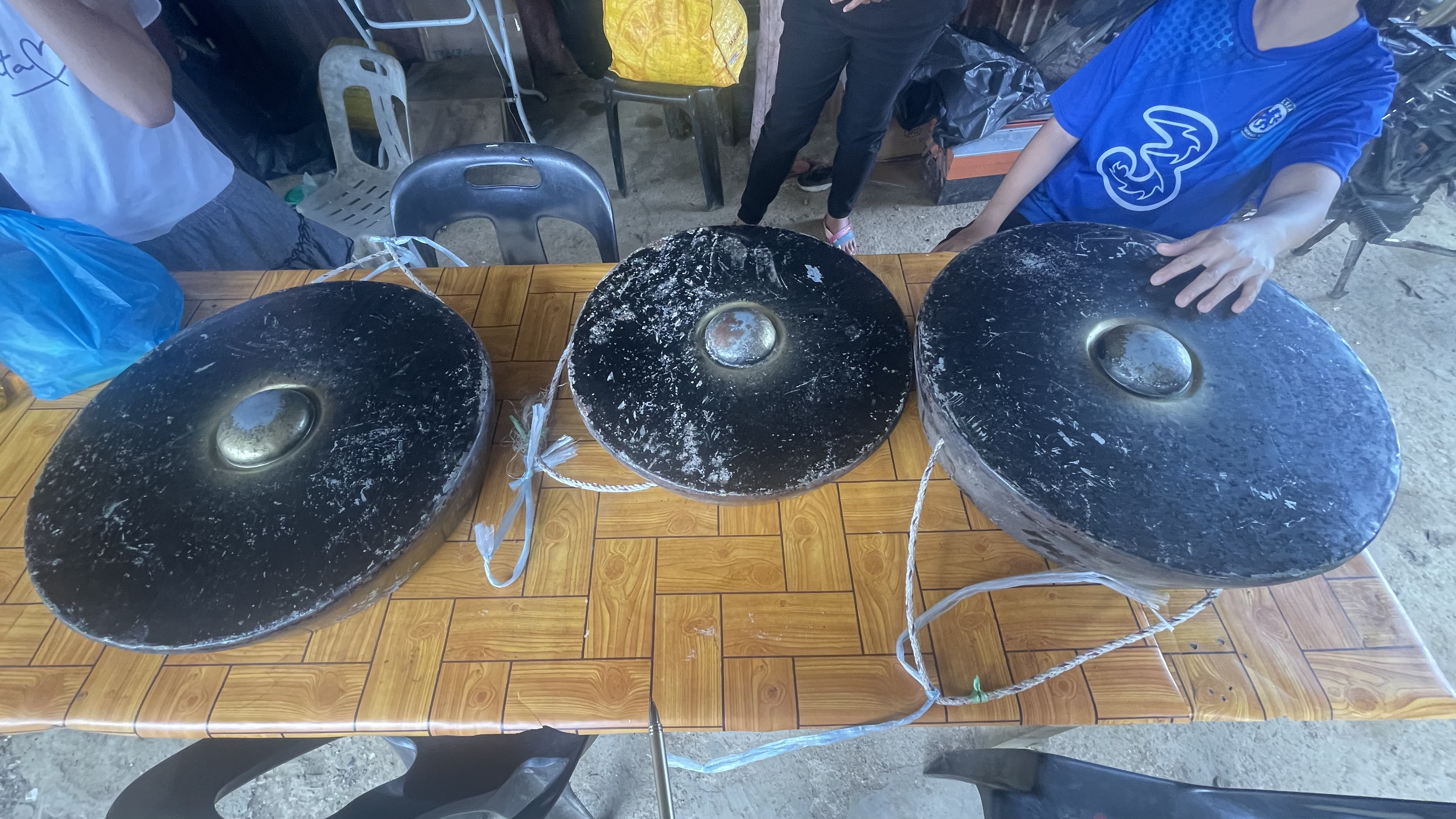
Traditional musical instruments of the Kadazan-Dusun. Clockwise from upper right: sompoton, tagung (gong), turali, and kulintangan

The traditional Kadazan-Dusun music consist of several traditional musical instruments, such as the bamboo flute of sompoton, the togunggak, the tagung (gong), and the kulintangan. Classified into chordophones (consisting of gagayan or sundatang, tongkungon, and the Arabian-influenced gambus), aerophones (consisting of bungkau, suling, turali or tuahi, and sompoton), idiophones (gong, kulintangan, togunggak, and turuding), and membranophones (consisting of gendang, kompang, or tontog). The most common musical instruments in Kadazan-Dusun ceremonies are the gong and kulintangan with the gong beat usually varies by region and district based on each of the Dusunic subgroups.

The Tatana Dusun are famous for their ginda, a traditional, spontaneous vocal tradition which functions as an oral storytelling medium, often used to share experiences, express emotions like joy and sorrow, or pass down life lessons to the younger generation. The ginda consists of a total of 32, which is one of the main traditional songs for the sub-ethnic group, apart from badaup, bolibag, boluai, mibobogo, and nandong, that are used during ritual ceremonies to interact with supernatural beings. There are also classic literary names of bo'or, rina'at and sunda'at with singing called tabai insi and todindot among the Kimaragang Dusun. Modern Kadazan-Dusun ethnic music is currently being preserved and promoted through various methods, including the nurturing of younger generations with traditional instrument skills and the promotion of Dusun music on modern major music streaming platforms.

=== Traditional medicine ===
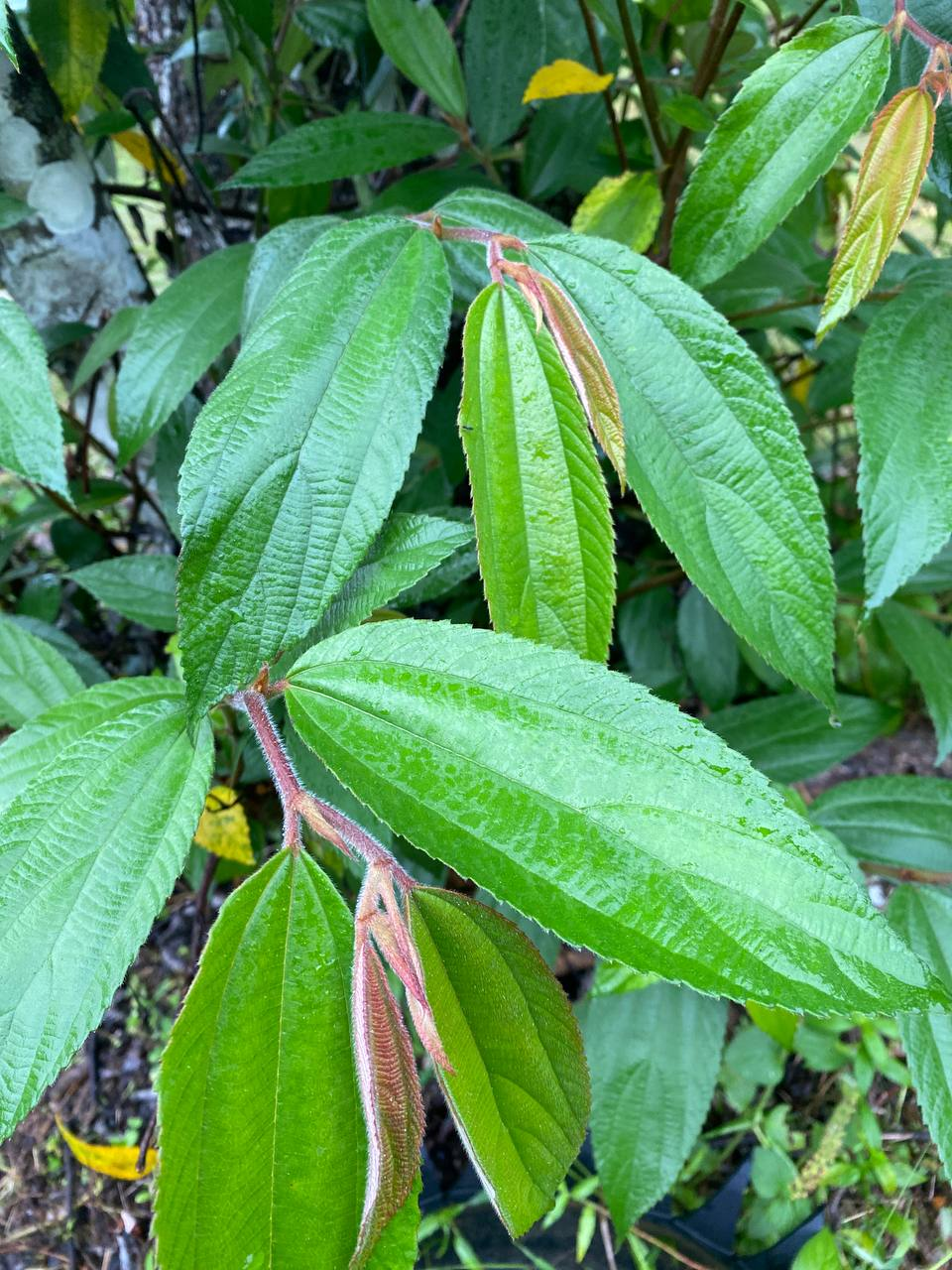
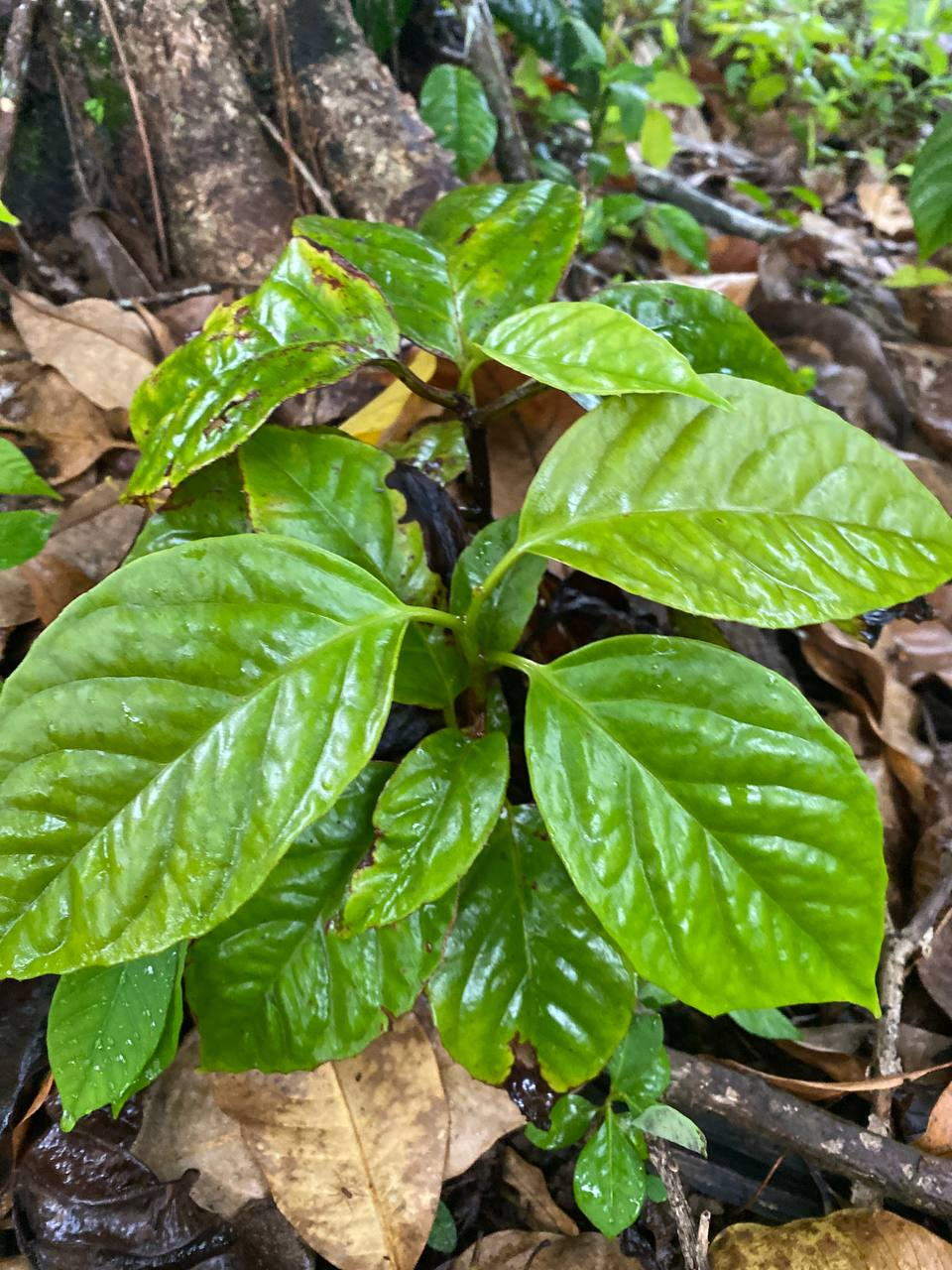
(Left) Mandahasi (Leucosyke capitellata), a plant commonly known among the Kadazan-Dusun community to cure sicknesses such as back pain, stomach bloating, diarrhoea, and eyes pain
(Right) Kosup (Chloranthus spicatus) is used to treat various types of wounds

Being associated with nature, the Kadazan-Dusun people are known for their traditional healing and medical herbs. Around 50 plant species are commonly used by Kadazan-Dusun communities around Crocker Mountains to treat specific ailments, which include those used for treating common afflictions such as coughs, diarrhoea, fever, malaria, various skin diseases, and minor wounds. The Tobilung Dusun of Kudat are known for a total of 49 species of plants from 33 families that were used by the community to treat specific ailments. The Dusuns of the Toboh Laut Village of Keningau District are known for their three types of herbs that are still used until the present, namely the lintotobou, tawawo, and tompu. Lintotobou is consumed to stop bleeding as well as restore body energy, Tawawo is used in postpartum baths for indigenous Dusun women, while tompu is commonly used to treat various skin diseases. Among the Dusuns of Tikolod Village in Tambunan District, 75 species of plants (in 44 families) were used as medicines while the rest either used for constructions, handicraft, musical instruments and animal traps. Based on research conducted in 2019 around the market area (tamu) within the West Coast Division of Sabah, Kadazan-Dusun women played the major role in medicinal plant markets, with 77% of medicinal plant sellers within the study area being from the Kadazan-Dusun ethnicity, followed by Sino-Natives (8%) and other indigenous people (13%). The medicinal plants sold consist of 70 species from 42 families, the majority from wooden plants and herb species.

=== Language ===
Kadazan-Dusun languages are grouped under the Dusunic family languages, an Austronesian language family spoken in the northern part of Borneo, where it consists of the main dialect of Central Dusun languages with other Dusunic dialects of Kimaragang, Garo, Kuala Monsok, Minokok and Tempasuk. Together with the Kadazan language, it is the mother tongue of the majority of indigenous people in Sabah. The Kadazan are distinguished from the Dusun, especially through their "v", and "z" dialect, whereas the Dusun commonly use the "r", "w", and "y" dialect. Other Dusun sub-ethnic languages, such as the Kimaragang Dusun of northeastern Sabah, also share some close vowel harmony with the Timugon Murut of Tenom District, which is one of the dialects within the large grouping of Murut languages, with both Dusunic and Murutic languages being closely related in vocabulary, phonological and grammatical similarities. The Dusun, Kadazan, and Rungus languages, together with the Muruts, also share some similarities with the languages of the Philippines, such as Tagalog. Below are some examples of Kadazan and Dusun words with translations in English:

English	Kadazan	Dusun
What is your name?	Isai ngaan nu?	Isai ngaran nu?
My name is John	Ngaan ku nopo nga i John.	Ngaran ku nopo nga i John.
How are you?	Onu abal nu?	Nunu kabar nu?
I am fine	Noikot vinasi	Osonong kopio
Where is Mary?	Nombo zi Mary?	Nonggo i Mary?
Thank you	Kotohuadan	Pounsikou/Kotoluadan
How much is this?	Pio hoogo/gatang diti?	Piro gatang diti?
I don't understand	Au zou kalati	Au oku karati
I miss you	Hangadon zou diau	Langadon oku dika
Do you speak English?	Koiho ko moboos do Onggilis?	Koilo ko mimboros do Inggilis?
Where are you from?	Nombo o nontodonon nu?	Honggo tadon nu?
River	Bavang	Bawang

=== Religion ===
Religions of Kadazan-Dusuns
Religion	Percent
Christianity	74.80%
Islam	22.68%
Folk religion / Other religions	0.09%
No religion / Unknown	1.83%

The majority of the Kadazan-Dusuns are Christians, mainly Roman Catholics and some Protestants. (Note: The large majority of both the Kadazan and Dusun indigenous are Christians of Roman Catholic and Protestant denominations. Among Protestants, the main branch most Dusunic groups adhered to is the Borneo Evangelical Church (SIB).) Islam is also practised by a minority amongst some of the indigenous Dusuns in Ranau as well as the Kadazan-Dusun sub-ethnic group of the Bisayas in the Beaufort, Kuala Penyu, and Sipitang districts. Adats plays an important part in the daily lives of the Kadazan-Dusun ethnics and is recognised by the government of Sabah as part of the Native Laws, which originated from the traditional religion before their conversion to mainstream Abrahamic religions. There had been various earlier attempts to Christianise the natives of northern Borneo before the arrival of the British, but due to difficulties and various obstacles to preach through the interior jungles of Borneo, the mission was brought to a halt. The influence of the English-speaking missionaries in British North Borneo during the late 19th century, particularly the Catholic Mill Hill mission, resulted in Christianity, in its Roman Catholic form, rising to prominence amongst the Kadazans in Penampang as well as Papar in Sabah's West Coast Division as well as a large majority of Dusuns in Tambunan in the Interior Division.

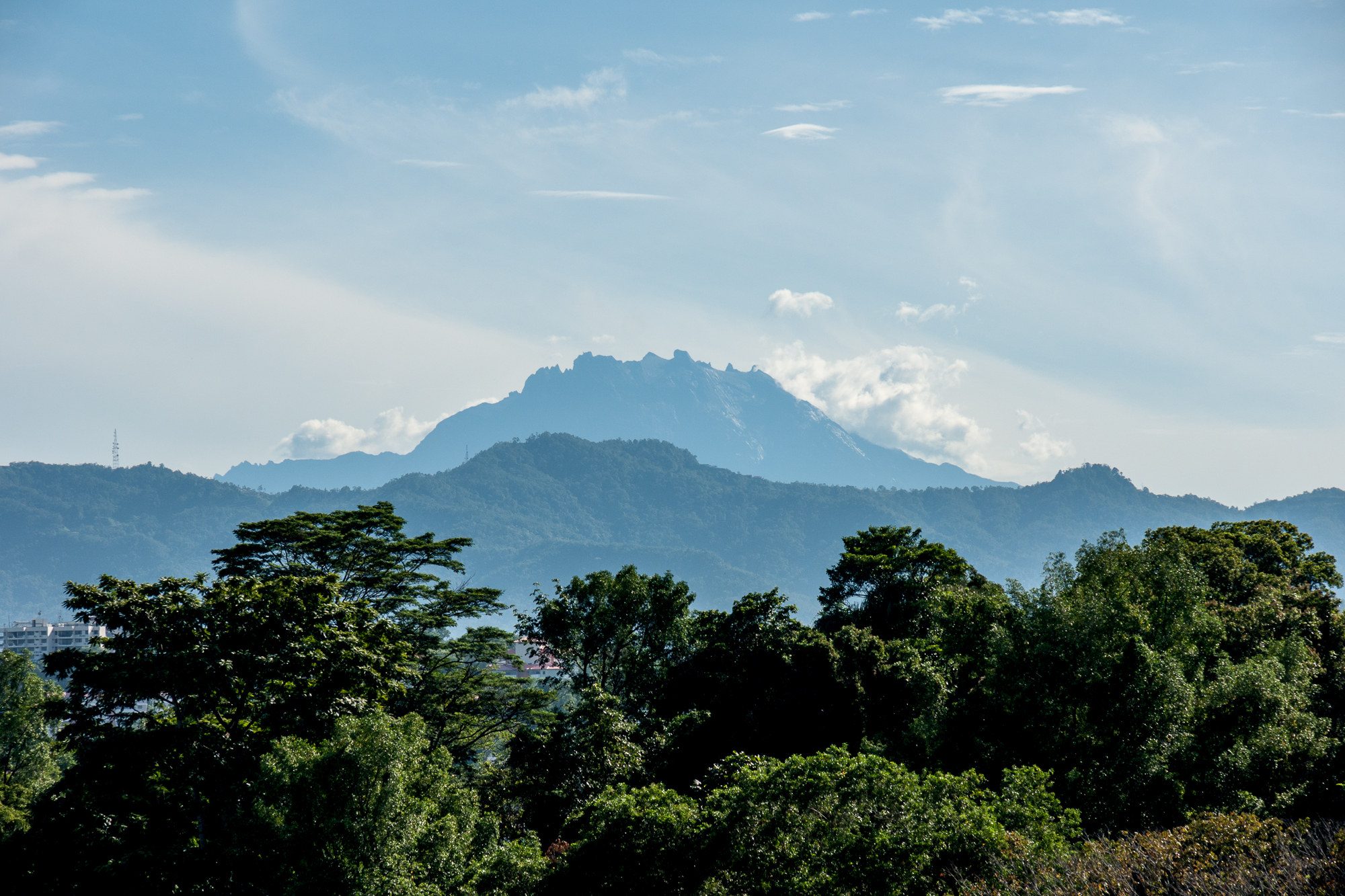
Mount Kinabalu, the highest summit on the island of Borneo, a sacred mountain among the indigenous Kadazan and Dusun.

Earlier in 1881, Pope Leo XIII requested the Rev. Fr. Jackson to deliver Christianity among the animist-pagan natives of Borneo, with Roman Catholics being the first to send a priest to North Borneo. This was followed by the Protestant missions of the Mill Hill Missionaries (MHM) in 1881 and Society for the Propagation of the Gospel (SPG) in 1888. In the 1901 North Borneo Population Census of the British Empire, a total of 19,784 Dusuns, consisting of 18,252 (males) and 15,204 (females), are recorded. In the 1991 Sabah Population Census, a total of 237,594 (73.89%) Kadazan-Dusuns adhered to Christianity, 57,355 (17.84%) to Islam, and another 19,404 (6.03%) identified as irreligious or pagan, while the others adhered to various other different religions. The data show that Christian adherence among the indigenous group is four times more numerous than Muslims. Likewise, there are significant numbers of Kadazan-Dusun who have no religion or pagan. In the 2010 Population Census, there were a total of 568,575 Kadazan-Dusuns, with 425,310 (74.80%) adhering to Christianity and another 128,939 (22.68%) to Islam, while 7,103 (1.83%) are unidentified.

The majority of both the Kadazan and the Dusun believe that the spirits of their ancestors dwell at the summit of Mount Kinabalu, a belief which has been passed through generations even before their conversion to mainstream religion. The Kadazan-Dusun call this mountain Kinabalu, which is derived from two words, aki, which carries the meaning of "ancestor", and nabalu or nabahu, which means "coffin". Thus, the mountain native carries the meaning of "abode of the dead".

== Indigenous status ==
The coat of arms and flag of Sabah, featuring the Mount Kinabalu as the main symbol which is the sacred mountain among the indigenous Kadazan and Dusun

The indigenous Kadazan-Dusun people together with the Murut, Paitan, and Rungus of northern Borneo had their own unique ancestral and historical property rights, which traced their origin from their traditional religions that are protected by Adats based on customary practices. When the British North Borneo Chartered Company (NBCC) began to institute law over the territory of North Borneo following its acquisition, European government officials realised the need to recognise the importance of Native Customary Laws (NCL) in the daily lives of the indigenous people. The British administration subsequently incorporated this into Article 9 of the royal charter granted by the British government to the company on 1 November 1881. The article stated that:

In the administration of justice by the company to the people of Borneo, or to any of the inhabitants thereof, careful regard shall always be had to the customs and laws of the class or tribe or nation to which the parties respectively belong, especially with respect to the holding, possession, transfer and disposition of land and goods, and testate or interstate succession thereto, and marriage, divorce and legitimacy, and other rights of property and personal rights.

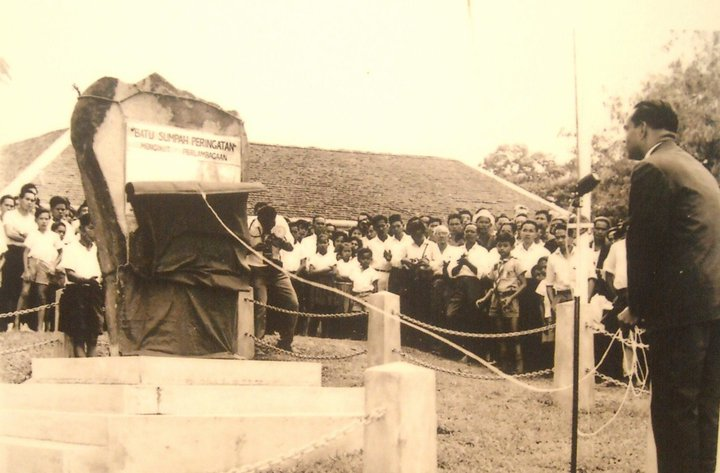
The Keningau Oath Stone officiating ceremony on 31 August 1964, an important agreement remembrance that has been promised between interior indigenous Sabahans and the Malaysian federal government

The Kadazan-Dusun are conferred the same political, educational and economic rights as the predominant Malay population of Malaysia when the British Crown Colony of North Borneo (present-day Sabah) became part of the federation of Malaysia on 16 September 1963. Among the Kadazan-Dusuns, Mount Kinabalu holds significant symbols within their homeland of Sabah, where it is considered as their temple and purgatory. Named from Aki Nabalu, which translates as "the resting place of the souls of the departed", the mountain has a direct link to the tribe's traditional belief that their sky deity Kinohiringan and his wife, the earth deity Umunsumundu, together created the universe. The mountain is featured in both the coat of arms and state flag to the present as the main symbol of Sabah.

== Notable people ==
- Mohamad Adnan Robert, former sixth Sabah state governor.
- Ahmad Koroh, former fifth Sabah governor.
- Alto Linus, former Malaysian and Sabah footballer.
- Arthur Joseph Kurup, current Malaysian Minister of Natural Resources and Environmental Sustainability, president for United Sabah People's Party (PBRS) and current member of parliament for Pensiangan.
- Bernard Giluk Dompok, Malaysian ambassador to the Vatican from 2016 to 2018, former chief minister of Sabah and former federal minister.
- Clarence Mansul, former deputy minister of Malaysia and former member of parliament for Penampang.
- Cornelius Piong, Catholic bishop of the Diocese of Keningau.
- Daphne Iking, Malaysian television personality, emcee, and occasional actress, hailing from Keningau.
- Darell Leiking, former Malaysian cabinet minister and state assemblyman for Moyog.
- Dass Gregory Kolopis, former Sabah footballer.
- Donald Mojuntin, Malaysian politician and lawyer, son of Peter Mojuntin.
- Ewon Benedick, current member of parliament for Penampang.
- Ewon Ebin, former federal minister of Malaysia.
- Fuad Stephens, former first and third chief minister of Sabah and former third Sabah state governor.
- Gunsanad Kina, famous Sabah tribal native chief from Keningau.
- Mohd Hamdan Abdullah, former fourth Sabah state governor.
- Jeffrey Kitingan, deputy chief minister of Sabah, current member of Malaysian Parliament for Keningau and state assemblyman for Tambunan.
- James Ongkili, former cabinet minister in the 1980s.
- Jonathan Yasin, current member of parliament for Ranau.
- Julius Dusin Gitom, Catholic bishop of the Diocese of Sandakan.
- Juhar Mahiruddin, former tenth Sabah governor.
- Joseph Kurup, former federal minister of Malaysia.
- Joseph Pairin Kitingan, former seventh chief minister of Sabah.
- Kasitah Gaddam, former federal Cabinet minister and senator.
- Marsha Milan, Malaysian singer and actress.
- Maximus Ongkili, former minister in the prime minister's Department for Sabah and Sarawak Affairs.
- Musa Aman, state governor of Sabah since 2025.
- Peter Anthony, former Sabah state cabinet minister.
- Peter Mojuntin, former fifth State Minister of Local Government and Housing
- Richard Malanjum, 9th chief justice of Malaysia and the 4th chief judge of the High Court in Sabah and Sarawak.
- Ronald Kiandee, former deputy speaker for the Dewan Rakyat and current member of parliament for Beluran.
- Sedomon Gunsanad Kina, tribal chief of Sabah's interior division during the colonial and early nationhood eras in 1963.
- Stacy, Malaysian singer, hailing from Penampang.
- Tracie Sinidol, Malaysian actress and model, also of partial Murut ancestry, hailing from Keningau.
- Wilfred Madius Tangau, former federal minister of Sabah and former deputy chief minister of Sabah.

== See also ==
- Dayak people, another unifying term for Bornean indigenous people used in neighbouring Sarawak and Kalimantan
- Paitan people, another classification term for Bornean indigenous people used in northeastern Sabah for Paitanic-speaking peoples
