= List of people from Sabah =

State flag of Sabah

The following is a list of prominent people who were born in or have lived in the Malaysian state of Sabah, or for whom Sabah is a significant part of their identity.

== A ==
- Abdul Gani Patail – Attorney General of Malaysia, born in Lahad Datu
- Abdul Ghapur Salleh – former member of parliament for Kalabakan, Tawau
- Abdul Mutalib Mohamed Daud – former chief editor of the news portal Sabahkini.net
- Abdul Rahim Bakri – member of parliament for Kudat
- Abdul Rahman Dahlan – former member of parliament for Kota Belud
- Adira – singer, born in Ranau
- Ahmad Koroh – 5th Governor of Sabah
- Ahmadshah Abdullah – 9th Governor of Sabah
- Alex Lim – swimmer, born in Sandakan
- Alto Linus – footballer, born in Keningau
- Amber Chia – model, actress, television personality and brand ambassador, born in Teluk Intan, Perak and spent her childhood in Tawau
- Andrew Sheng – Hong Kong Securities and Futures Commission (SFC) chairman, born in China and migrated to Sabah
- Anifah Aman – Malaysian Foreign Affairs minister
- Anthea Phillipps – British botanist, spent most of her life in Kota Kinabalu with her husband Anthony Lamb
- Anthony Lamb – British botanist, spent most of his life in Kota Kinabalu with his wife Anthea Phillipps
- Amelia Alicia Anscelly – badminton player, born in Kota Kinabalu
- Amir Kahar – state assemblymen for Banggi
- Antanum – Murut historical warrior
- Ationg Tituh - Founder and former president of PGRS Organisation
- Awang Husaini Sahari – member of parliament for Putatan, Kota Kinabalu
- Azizah Mohd Dun – State Minister for Community Development and Consumer Affairs

== B ==
- Ben Leong – golfer
- Bernard Giluk Dompok – 11th Chief Minister of Sabah and Malaysian Ambassador to the Vatican City, born in Penampang
- Bobby Gonzales – footballer, born in Beaufort
- Brynn Zalina Lovett – Australian-Malaysian dancer and swimming instructor and winner of Miss World Malaysia 2015, born in Beaufort
- Bung Moktar Radin – member of parliament for Kinabatangan

== C ==
- Chan Foong Hin – member of parliament for Kota Kinabalu
- Che'Nelle – recording artist signed to Universal Music Japan, born in Putatan, Kota Kinabalu
- Christian Didier Chin – tennis player
- Christina Liew – member of parliament for Tawau as well the Sabah Deputy Chief Minister, born in Hong Kong and migrated to Sabah
- Chong Kah Kiat – 13th Chief Minister of Sabah, born in Kudat
- Chua Soon Bui – former member of parliament for Tawau
- Constantine Clement – weightlifter, born in Tambunan

== D ==
- Daphne Iking – television personality, emcee and occasional actress, born in Keningau
- Darell Leiking – member of parliament for Penampang, born in Penampang
- Dass Gregory Kolopis – footballer, born in Kota Belud
- David Wong Dak Wah – 5th Chief Judge of the High Court in Sabah and Sarawak
- Diana Angeles Ramirez Salvidar – Mexican veterinary, spent eight years working with Wildlife Rescue Unit (WRU) at the Danau Girang Field Centre on various projects including the collaring of elephants, clouded leopards, proboscis monkeys and crocodiles until her sudden death due to ingestion of substance in late 2018

== E ==
- Edmund Chong Ket Wah – former member of parliament for Batu Sapi, Sandakan, born in Sandakan
- Elizabeth Choy – Singaporean educator and councillor regarded as a war heroine, born in Kudat
- Elvin Chia – swimmer, born in Sandakan
- Eric Majimbun – member of parliament for Sepanggar, Kota Kinabalu, born in Inanam
- Esther Applunius – singer and songwriter, born in Tambunan
- Ewon Ebin – former Malaysian Science, Technology and Innovation minister

== F ==
- Fuad Stephens – 1st Chief Minister of Sabah, born in Kudat
- Fung Bo Bo – Hong Kong actress, born in Sandakan

== G ==
- Gabuh Piging – athletics, North Borneo Crown competitor at the 1956 Summer Olympics
- Gary Chaw – Taiwanese singer and songwriter, born in Kota Belud

== H ==
- Hajiji Noor – Politician, current Chief Minister of Sabah
- Harris Salleh – 6th Chief Minister of Sabah, born during Labuan was still part of North Borneo Crown
- Hassan Sani – footballer, born during Labuan was still part of North Borneo Crown
- Hiew King Cheu – former member of parliament for Luyang, Kota Kinabalu

== I ==
- Iain Steel – golfer
- Isnaraissah Munirah Majilis – member of parliament for Kota Belud, born in Kota Belud

== J ==
- James Wong – footballer, born in Kota Kinabalu
- Jeffrey Kitingan – member of parliament for Keningau as well the State Legislative Assembly for Bingkor, born in Kota Marudu
- Joey Ryan Gundok – footballer, born in Tuaran
- John Lee Hiong Fun-Yit Yaw – priest, born in Kota Kinabalu
- John Wong Soo Kau – priest, born in Sandakan
- Joseph Kurup – former member of parliament for Pensiangan and Minister in the Prime Minister's Department
- Joseph Pairin Kitingan – 7th Chief Minister of Sabah and Paramount Leader of Kadazan-Dusun Cultural Association (KDCA), born in Papar
- Juhar Mahiruddin – 10th Governor of Sabah, born in Tambisan Island, Sandakan
- Julamri Muhammad – footballer, born in Tawau
- Junior Eldstål – Malaysian-Swedish footballer, born in Kota Kinabalu
- Juslie Ajirol – former member of parliament for Libaran, Sandakan

== K ==
- K. A. Vanar – Sabah Indian Association President who was instrumental in getting Deepavali declared as a public holiday in the state
- Kasitah Gaddam – Malaysian Land and Cooperative Development minister
- Ken Shellito – English footballer and former Chelsea F.C. manager, spent most of his later life with his family in Inanam of Kota Kinabalu

== L ==
- Lajim Ukin – former member of parliament for Beaufort
- Leopold Alphonso – footballer
- Liew Vui Keong – former member of parliament for Sandakan
- Linda Tsen – former member of parliament for Batu Sapi, Sandakan

== M ==
- Mafry Balang – footballer, born in Sipitang
- Marcus Mojigoh – former member of parliament for Putatan, born in Putatan
- Marsha Milan Londoh – singer and actress, born in Berrien Springs, Michigan, United States and spent her adulthood in Kota Kinabalu
- Mary Yap Kain Ching – former member of parliament for Tawau
- Mat Salleh – Bajau/Suluk historical warrior
- Matlan Marjan – footballer, brother of Zainizam Marjan, born in Kota Belud
- Matthew Davies
- Matthew William – cricketer, born in Kota Kinabalu
- Maximus Ongkili – former member of parliament for Kota Marudu as well Malaysian Energy, Green Technology and Water minister
- Melter Tais – clergyman in the Anglican Church, also the Bishop of Sabah from 2015 and the sixth Archbishop of Church of the Province of South East Asia from 2015
- MK K-Clique – Hip hop and rap singer
- Mohammad Said Keruak – 9th Governor of Sabah and 4th Chief Minister of Sabah, born in Kota Belud
- Mohamad Adnan Robert – 6th Governor of Sabah
- Mohd Hamdan Abdullah – 4th Governor of Sabah
- Mohd Reithaudin Awang Emran – footballer, born in Lahad Datu
- Monsopiad – Kadazan-Dusun historical warrior
- Musa Aman – 14th Chief Minister of Sabah, born in Beaufort
- Mustapha Harun – 1st Governor of Sabah and 3rd Chief Minister of Sabah, born in Kudat
- M. Sivakumar – footballer

== N ==
- Nikki – singer and actress, born in Berrien Springs, Michigan, United States and spent her adulthood in Tambunan
- Noki K-Clique – Hip hop and rap singer

== O ==
- Osu Sukam – 12th Chief Minister of Sabah, born in Papar

== P ==
- Pandikar Amin Mulia – Speaker of the House of Representatives, born in Kota Belud
- Patricia Yapp Syau Yin – Royal Malaysian Air Force (RMAF) MiG-29 female pilot, born in Sandakan
- Pengiran Ahmad Raffae – 2nd Governor of Sabah
- Penny Wong – Australian politician, born in Kota Kinabalu
- Pete Teo – singer songwriter, film composer and filmmaker, born in Tawau
- Peter Joinud Mojuntin – politician, born in Penampang
- Peter Lo Sui Yin – 2nd Chief Minister of Sabah, born in Sandakan
- Peter Pragas – composer and musician
- Peter Rajah – footballer, born in Sandakan
- Philip Lee Tau Sang – member of the Advisory Council of North Borneo (1947–1950), the Legislative Council of North Borneo (1950–1958) and the Executive Council of North Borneo (1950–1953, 1956–1957)

== R ==
- Radzi Mohd Hussin – footballer, born in Beaufort
- Rafiuddin Roddin – footballer, born in Tawau
- Raime Unggi – former member of parliament for Tenom, born in Tenom
- Ramlee Awang Murshid – novelist, born in Papar
- Randy Baruh - footballer, born in Sipitang.
- Rayzam Shah Wan Sofian – athletics, born in Keningau
- Razlan Oto – footballer, born in Sandakan
- Red Hong Yi – architectural designer artist, born in Kota Kinabalu
- Rezuan Khan Ahman – footballer, born in Kota Kinabalu
- Richard Malanjum – 9th Chief Justice of Malaysia and the 4th Chief Judge of the High Court in Sabah and Sarawak
- Rita Gani – football referee
- Robson Rendy Rining - footballer, born in Sipitang
- Roland Koh – clergyman in the Anglican Church, also the second Bishop of Sabah from 1965 until 1970 and the first Bishop of West Malaysia from 1970 until his death
- Ronald Kiandee – member of parliament for Beluran
- Ronny Harun – footballer, born in Sipitang
- Rosdin Wasli – footballer, born in Petagas, Kota Kinabalu
- Rosnah Shirlin – Malaysian Deputy Minister of Works and member of parliament for Papar, born in Kota Belud
- Rozaimi Abdul Rahman – footballer, born in Bongawan, Papar

== S ==
- Sakaran Dandai – 8th Governor of Sabah and 8th Chief Minister of Sabah, born in Kampung Air, Semporna
- Salleh Kalbi – former member of parliament for Silam, Lahad Datu
- Salleh Said Keruak – Malaysian Communication and Multimedia minister
- Sannatasah Saniru – badminton player
- Sapawi Ahmad – former member of parliament for Sipitang, born in Sipitang
- Sedomon Gunsanad Kina – native chief for Keningau
- Shafie Apdal – 15th Chief Minister of Sabah, born in Semporna
- Shahran Abdul Samad – footballer, born in Sandakan
- Shahrul Azhar Ture – footballer
- Siringan Gubat – former member of parliament for Ranau, born in Ranau
- Siswanto Haidi – cricketer, born in Tawau
- Sium Diau – athletics, North Borneo competitor at the 1956 Summer Olympics
- Soong Fie Cho – badminton player, born in Lahad Datu
- Stacy – singer and songwriter, born in Penampang
- Stephen R. Evans – British descent politician, public administrator and book author
- Sukarti Wakiman – Secretary of State of Sabah
- Sumardi Hajalan – footballer, born in Tawau

== T ==
- Tawfiq Titingan – politician, former Sabah State Legislative Assemblyman for Apas in Tawau
- Tina Rimmer – British artist and the state first cultural icon. Firstly settled in Lahad Datu of North Borneo Crown with her husband Bert Rimmer in 1959 until his death. She then spent most of her life in Kota Kinabalu
- Tuju K-Clique – Hip Hop and Rap solo singer of Brunei Malay descent

== V ==
- Vountus Indra Mawan – badminton player

== W ==
- Wawa Zainal – actress and model, born in Lahad Datu
- Wendy Hutton – New Zealander food and travel book writers based in Sabah, spent most of her life in Kota Kinabalu
- Wilfred Bumburing – member of parliament for Tuaran, born in Tuaran
- Wilfred Madius Tangau – Malaysian Science, Technology and Innovation minister
- Wong Sze Phin – State Assistant Minister and former member of parliament for Kota Kinabalu
- Wong Tien Fatt – member of parliament for Sandakan

== Y ==
- Yau-Man Chan – Malaysian-American table tennis player, born in Hong Kong and raised in Kota Kinabalu
- Yong Teck Lee – 10th Chief Minister of Sabah, born in Lahad Datu
- Yong Vui Kong – drug courier who was given life imprisonment in Singapore for trafficking heroin, born in Sandakan
- Yussof Mahal – former member of parliament for Labuan, born during Labuan was still part of North Borneo Crown

== Z ==
- Zainizam Marjan – footballer, brother of Matlan Marjan, born in Kota Belud
- Zaykiel Leong – footballer
- Zuraindey Jumai – footballer, born in Tuaran

== See also ==
- Demographics of Sabah
