= Tun Sakaran Museum =

- Muzium Tun Sakaran
- Established: 25 April 2015
- Location: Semporna, Sabah
- Coordinates: 4°28′33.14″N 118°36′12.6″E
- Type: Museum
- Owner: Sabah Museum

Tun Sakaran Museum (Malay: Muzium Tun Sakaran) is a museum in Semporna of Sabah, Malaysia. It is named after the 8th Yang di-Pertua Negeri of Sabah, Sakaran Dandai.

== History ==
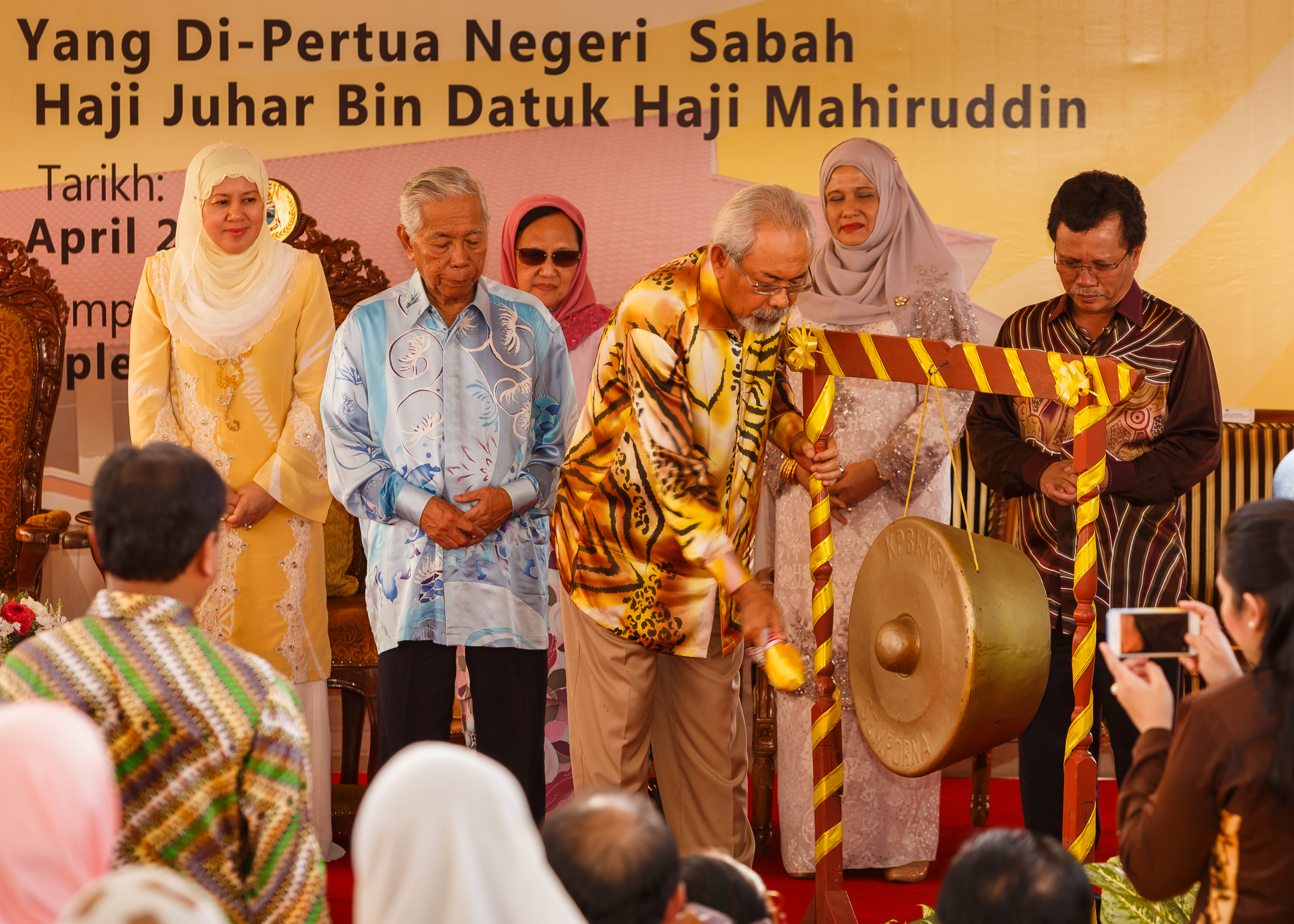
The museum opening ceremony on 25 April 2015 with the presence of Sakaran Dandai (standing left in blue sky shirt), Juhar Mahiruddin (middle), Shafie Apdal (right) together with their respective wives (behind).

The first ground-breaking ceremony took place on 31 December 2008 through a land donation from Sakaran Dandai himself. While the outside structure of the building was completed in 2010, it took until 2014 to complete the interior design and exhibition space. Before the official opening, the museum was partly open to visitors from 2014 to April 2015 as part of its soft openings. On 25 April 2015, the building was fully completed with a total cost of RM2.8 million funded by the Government of Sabah and officiated together by Sakaran Dandai, Juhar Mahiruddin and Shafie Apdal.

== Features ==
Although being named after Sakaran Dandai, the museum mostly features the history and culture of the town of Semporna, especially its Bajau community. The ground floor has a main gallery while the top floor exhibits culture and historical artefacts of the Semporna community with the exhibition will change from time to time. The museum also has cafeteria and small multipurpose room for the public to use.

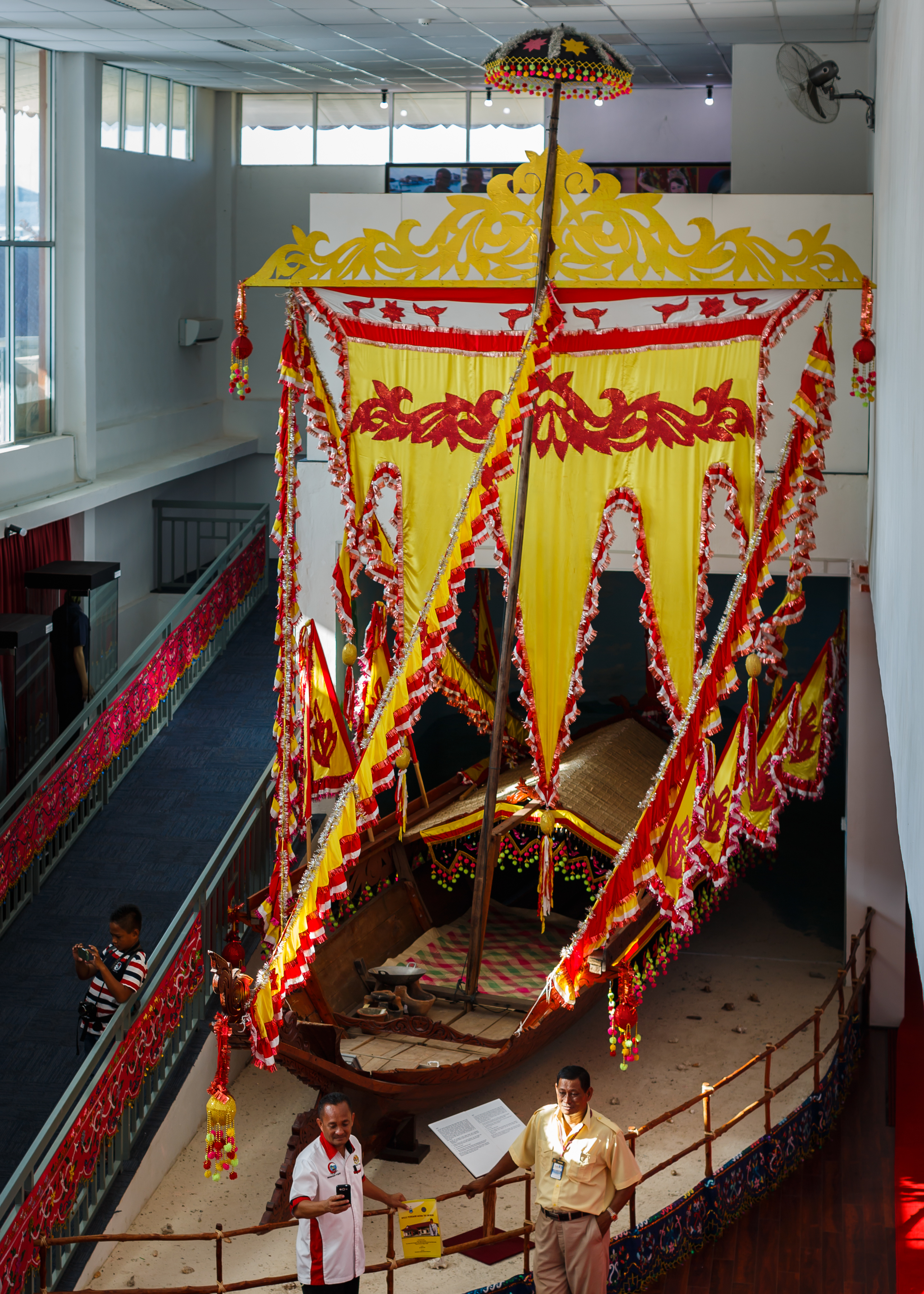
A lepa boat model as featured inside the museum.

== See also ==
- List of museums in Malaysia
