= Semporna (federal constituency) =

Federal constituency of Sabah, Malaysia

Semporna (P189)
Sabah constituency

Federal constituency
- Legislature: Dewan Rakyat
- MP: Mohd Shafie Apdal; Heritage
- Constituency created: 1984
- First contested: 1986
- Last contested: 2022

Demographics
- Population (2020): 166,587
- Electors (2025): 77,590
- Area (km²): 1,126
- Pop. density (per km²): 147.9

Semporna is a federal constituency in Tawau Division (Semporna District), Sabah, Malaysia, that has been represented in the Dewan Rakyat since 1986.

The federal constituency was created from parts of the Silam constituency and Tawau in the 1984 redistribution and is mandated to return a single member to the Dewan Rakyat under the first past the post voting system.

== Demographics ==
https://ge15.orientaldaily.com.my/seats/sabah/p

Ethnic breakdown of Semporna's electorate as of 2022
1. Sabah Bumiputera (63.6%)
2. Malay-Muslim Bumiputera (32.3%)
3. Other ethnicities (2.60%)
4. Chinese (1.60%)

As of 2020, Semporna has a population of 166,587 people.

Age breakdown of Semporna's electorate as of 2022
1. 18-20 (9.10%)
2. 21-29 (26.0%)
3. 30-39 (22.6%)
4. 40-49 (16.7%)
5. 50-59 (12.2%)
6. 60-69 (7.90%)
7. 70-79 (2.59%)
8. 80-89 (1.58%)
9. above 90 (1.32%)
Gender breakdown of Semporna's electorate as of 2022
1. Male (49.8%)
2. Female (50.2%)

== History ==
=== Polling districts ===
According to the gazette issued on 21 November 2025, the Semporna constituency has a total of 32 polling districts.

State constituency	Polling Districts	Code	Location
Sulabayan（N64）	Pulau	189/64/01	SK Pulau Balit
Sulabayan（N64）	Bum-Bum Utara	189/64/02	SK Balimbang
Sulabayan（N64）	Sisipan	189/64/03	SK Sisipan
Sulabayan（N64）	Bum-Bum Selatan	189/64/04	SK Pulau Bum-Bum
Sulabayan（N64）	Sulabayan	189/64/05	SK Sulabayan
Sulabayan（N64）	Denawan	189/64/06	SK Pulau Denawan
Sulabayan（N64）	Larapan	189/64/07	SK Pulau Sumandi
Sulabayan（N64）	Selakan	189/64/08	SK Selakan
Sulabayan（N64）	Terusan	189/64/09	SK Terusan Baru
Sulabayan（N64）	Hampalan	189/64/10	SK Hampalan
Sulabayan（N64）	Tongkalloh	189/64/11	SK Tongkalloh
Sulabayan（N64）	Pulau Omadal	189/64/12	SK Pulau Omadal
Senallang（N65）	Pekan Semporna	189/65/01	SK Pekan Semporna
Senallang（N65）	Tampi-Tampi	189/65/02	SK Tampi-Tampi
Senallang（N65）	Kabogan	189/65/03	SK Kabogan
Senallang（N65）	Pakalangan	189/65/04	SK Kampung Pokas
Senallang（N65）	Tagasan	189/65/05	SMK Tagasan
Senallang（N65）	Mantaritip	189/65/06	SK Kalumpang; SK Pegagu
Senallang（N65）	Musallah	189/65/07	SK Pekan Semporna II
Senallang（N65）	Inabah Kamal	189/65/08	SA Tun Sakaran
Senallang（N65）	Pulau Mabul	189/65/09	SK Pulau Mabul
Senallang（N65）	Bukit Lalang	189/65/10	SK Bukit Lalang
Senallang（N65）	Kubang Baru	189/65/11	SK Kubang Pinang
Bugaya（N66）	Semporna Darat	189/66/01	SK Gading-Gading
Bugaya（N66）	Sungai Tohok	189/66/02	SK Sungai Tohok
Bugaya（N66）	Bugaya	189/66/03	SK Bugaya
Bugaya（N66）	Tanjung Kapor	189/66/04	SK Tanjung Kapor
Bugaya（N66）	Bubul	189/66/05	SK Bubul; SK Bubul II
Bugaya（N66）	Kampong Ayer	189/66/06	SA Negeri Pekan Semporna
Bugaya（N66）	Lihak-Lihak	189/66/07	SK Lihak-Lihak
Bugaya（N66）	Simunul	189/66/08	SK Kampung Simunul
Bugaya（N66）	Bangau-Bangau	189/66/09	SJK (C) Nyuk Hwa

=== Representation history ===
Members of Parliament for Semporna
Parliament	No	Years	Member	Party	Vote Share
Constituency created from Silam and Tawau
7th	P153	1986–1990	Sakaran Dandai (ساکران محمد هاشم دانداي)	BN (USNO)	6,063; 51.26%
8th	P153	1990–1995	Sakaran Dandai (ساکران محمد هاشم دانداي)	BN (UMNO)	10,832; 58.85%
9th	P164	1995–1999	Mohd Shafie Apdal (محمد شافعي اڤدل)	BN (UMNO)	17,006; 78.03%
10th	P164	1999–2004	Mohd Shafie Apdal (محمد شافعي اڤدل)	BN (UMNO)	18,570; 77.98%
11th	P189	2004–2008	Mohd Shafie Apdal (محمد شافعي اڤدل)	BN (UMNO)	15,215; 76.25%
12th	P189	2008–2013	Mohd Shafie Apdal (محمد شافعي اڤدل)	BN (UMNO)	19,419; 90.84%
13th	P189	2013-2016	Mohd Shafie Apdal (محمد شافعي اڤدل)	BN (UMNO)	25,559; 83.70%
13th	P189	2016–2018	Mohd Shafie Apdal (محمد شافعي اڤدل)	WARISAN	25,559; 83.70%
14th	P189	2018–2022	Mohd Shafie Apdal (محمد شافعي اڤدل)	WARISAN	26,809; 80.20%
15th	P189	2022–present	Mohd Shafie Apdal (محمد شافعي اڤدل)	WARISAN	28,702; 73.77%

=== State constituency ===
Parliamentary constituency	State constituency					
Parliamentary constituency	1967–1974	1974–1985	1985–1995	1995–2004	2004–2020	2020–present
Semporna			Balung			
Semporna					Bugaya	
Semporna				Senallang		
Semporna			Sulabayan			

=== Historical boundaries ===
Parliamentary constituency	Area			
Parliamentary constituency	1984	1994	2003	2019
Balung	Balung; Batu Payung; Taman Sawit; Taman Semarak Merah; Tinagat	Balung; Bandar Sri Indah; Batu Payung; Taman Sawit; Tinagat		
Bugaya			Bubul; Bugaya; Kamong Ayer; Lihak-Lihak; Simunul	
Senallang		Inabah Kamal; Pulau Mabul; Semporna; Senallang; Tampi-Tampi		
Sulabayan	Pulau Bait; Pulau Bum-Bum; Pulau Sulabayan; Pulau Timbun Mata; Tun Sakaran Marine Park			

=== Current state assembly members ===
No.	State Constituency	Member	Coalition (Party)
N64	Sulabayan	Jaujan Sambakong	WARISAN
N65	Senallang	Mohd. Shafie Apdal	WARISAN
N66	Bugaya	Jamil Hamzah	WARISAN

=== Local governments & postcodes ===
No.	State Constituency	Local Government	Postcode
N64	Sulabayan	Semporna District Council	91100 Lahad Datu; 91300 Semporna
N65	Senallang	Semporna District Council	91100 Lahad Datu; 91300 Semporna
N66	Bugaya	Semporna District Council	91100 Lahad Datu; 91300 Semporna

== Election results ==
Malaysian general election, 2022
Party	Candidate	Votes	%	∆%
Heritage	Mohd Shafie Apdal	28,702	73.77	▼6.43
GRS	Nixon Abdul Habi	7,892	20.28	▲20.28
PH	Arastam Pandorog	1,848	4.75	▲4.75
PEJUANG	Ab Rajik Hamid	467	1.20	▲1.20
Total valid votes		38,909	100.00	
Total rejected ballots		282		
Unreturned ballots		787		
Turnout		39,978	53.91	▼17.83
Registered electors		72,169		
Majority		20,810	53.49	▼8.36
Heritage hold		Swing		
Source(s) https://lom.agc.gov.my/ilims/upload/portal/akta/outputp/1753262/PUB619_2022.pdf

Malaysian general election, 2018
Party	Candidate	Votes	%	∆%
Sabah Heritage Party	Mohd Shafie Apdal	26,809	80.20	▲80.20
BN	Ramlee Marahaban	6,135	18.35	▼65.35
PAS	Abdul Nasir Ab Raup	384	1.15	▲1.15
Sabah People's Hope Party	Asmara Asmad	98	0.29	▲0.29
Total valid votes		33,426	100.00	
Total rejected ballots		982		
Unreturned ballots		205		
Turnout		34,613	71.74	▼4.30
Registered electors		48,248		
Majority		20,674	61.85	▼6.61
Sabah Heritage Party gain from BN		Swing		?
Source(s) "His Majesty's Government Gazette - Notice of Contested Election, Parliament for the State of Sabah [P.U. (B) 246/2018]" (PDF). Attorney General's Chambers of Malaysia. 3 May 2018. "Federal Government Gazette - Results of Contested Election and Statements of the Poll after the Official Addition of Votes, Parliamentary Constituencies for the State of Sabah [P.U. (B) 320/2018]" (PDF). Attorney General's Chambers of Malaysia. 28 May 2018. Archived from the original (PDF) on 2019-12-29.

Malaysian general election, 2013
Party	Candidate	Votes	%	∆%
BN	Mohd Shafie Apdal	25,559	83.70	▼7.14
PKR	Zamree @ Mohd Suffian Abdul Habi	4,654	15.24	▲6.08
Independent	Badaruddin Mustapha	325	1.06	▲1.06
Total valid votes		30,538	100.00	
Total rejected ballots		985		
Unreturned ballots		72		
Turnout		31,595	76.04	▲12.97
Registered electors		41,549		
Majority		20,905	68.46	▼13.25
BN hold		Swing		
Source(s) "Federal Government Gazette - Notice of Contested Election, Parliament for the State of Sabah [P.U. (B) 183/2013]" (PDF). Attorney General's Chambers of Malaysia. 26 April 2013. Archived from the original (PDF) on 2018-09-30. "Federal Government Gazette - Results of Contested Election and Statements of the Poll after the Official Addition of Votes, Parliamentary Constituencies for the State of Sabah [P.U. (B) 224/2013]" (PDF). Attorney General's Chambers of Malaysia. 22 May 2013. Archived from the original (PDF) on 2018-09-30.

Malaysian general election, 2008
Party	Candidate	Votes	%	∆%
BN	Mohd Shafie Apdal	19,419	90.84	▲14.59
PKR	Ab Azis Ab Hamid	1,957	9.16	▲5.45
Total valid votes		21,376	100.00	
Total rejected ballots		832		
Unreturned ballots		1		
Turnout		22,209	63.07	▲1.13
Registered electors		35,216		
Majority		17,462	81.71	▲14.96
BN hold		Swing		

Malaysian general election, 2004
Party	Candidate	Votes	%	∆%
BN	Mohd Shafie Apdal	15,215	76.25	▼1.73
Independent	Madjalis Lais	1,896	9.50	▲9.50
Independent	Aldani Landi	1,286	6.45	▲6.45
Independent	Noraidah Abdul Salleh	816	4.09	▲4.09
PKR	Mohd Abd Wahab Abdullah	740	3.71	▲3.71
Total valid votes		19,953	100.00	
Total rejected ballots		847		
Unreturned ballots		118		
Turnout		20,918	61.94	▲3.46
Registered electors		33,772		
Majority		13,319	66.75	▲10.79
BN hold		Swing		

Malaysian general election, 1999
Party	Candidate	Votes	%	∆%
BN	Mohd Shafie Apdal	18,570	77.98	▼0.05
Independent	Abdul Rahim @ Abdurahim	5,245	22.02	▲22.02
Total valid votes		23,815	100.00	
Total rejected ballots		326		
Unreturned ballots		14		
Turnout		24,155	58.48	▼8.11
Registered electors		41,300		
Majority		13,325	55.96	▼0.10
BN hold		Swing		

Malaysian general election, 1995
Party	Candidate	Votes	%	∆%
BN	Mohd Shafie Apdal	17,006	78.03	▲19.18
PBS	Sabardin Ombrah	4,788	21.97	▲21.97
Total valid votes		21,794	100.00	
Total rejected ballots		385		
Unreturned ballots		18		
Turnout		22,197	66.59	▲8.82
Registered electors		33,336		
Majority		12,218	56.06	▲38.36
BN hold		Swing		

Malaysian general election, 1990
Party	Candidate	Votes	%	∆%
BN	Sakaran Dandai	10,832	58.85	▲7.59
Independent	Abdillah Abdul Hamid	7,574	41.15	▲41.15
Total valid votes		18,406	100.00	
Total rejected ballots		160		
Unreturned ballots		0		
Turnout		18,566	57.77	▲6.21
Registered electors		32,139		
Majority		3,258	17.70	▲1.24
BN hold		Swing		

Malaysian general election, 1986
Party	Candidate	Votes	%
BN	Sakaran Dandai	6,063	51.26
BERJAYA	Abdillah Abdul Hamid	4,116	34.80
Independent	Jendy Jeffery	1,650	13.95
Total valid votes		11,829	100.00
Total rejected ballots		118	
Unreturned ballots		0	
Turnout		11,947	51.56
Registered electors		23,170	
Majority		1,947	16.46
This was a new constituency created out of Silam and Tawau which went to Independent and BN respectively in the previous election.
