= Joseph Ryan =

Joseph, Joe or Joey Ryan may refer to:

== Sportspeople ==
- Joseph Ryan (rower) (fl. 1904), American Olympic rower
- Joe Ryan (footballer) (1917–1986), Australian rules footballer
- Joe Ryan (baseball) (born 1996), baseball player
- Joey Ryan (born 1979), American wrestler
- Joe Ryan (fighter) (born 2004), British Muay Thai kickboxer

== Others ==
- Joseph O'Connell Ryan (1841–1938), Canadian politician, barrister and editor
- Joseph P. Ryan (1884–1963), American labor union leader
- Joe Ryan (politician) (1936–2016), American politician and businessman
- Shiny Joe Ryan (born 1987), Irish-Australian singer-songwriter
- Joseph T. Ryan (1913–2000), American prelate of the Roman Catholic Church
- Joseph Ryan (died 2023), victim in the murders of Christine Banfield and Joseph Ryan
- Joey Ryan, member of American duo The Milk Carton Kids

== See also ==
- Joey Ryan Gundok (born 1983), Malaysian professional footballer
