= Laila Gohar =

Egyptian chef

Laila Gohar (Arabic: ليلى جوهر; born 1988) is an Egyptian-American artist who works with food as her creative medium.

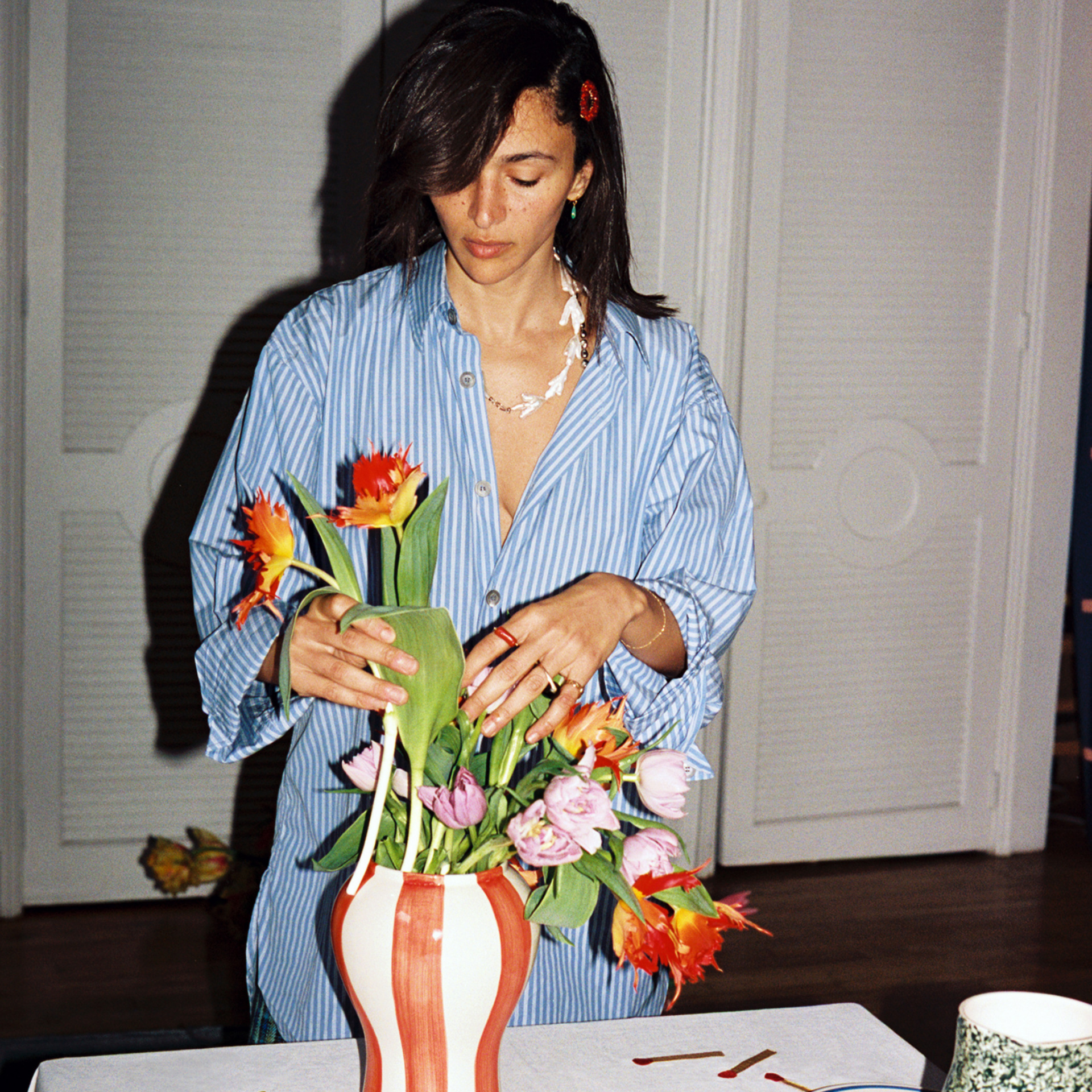

Born in Egypt, she has lived and worked in the US for the last decade. Laila’s work has been shown in museums and galleries all over the world. She is also known for her high profile collaborations, and has become a go-to person for fashion, design, gastronomic, and luxury partners who are interested in engaging new audiences using food and visual storytelling.

Her ability to curate and create content that captures the zeitgeist has amassed her a following of 260k followers on Instagram.

Beyond this, her work has evolved into product design, launching the eponymous label Gohar World alongside her sister Nadia Gohar in 2022. Laila is also a contributing writer for the FT HTSI, where she writes a regular column called How To Host It.

In 2022 Laila designed a homeware collection for esteemed Danish design company, HAY. The collection is titled Sobremesa and available at Hay locations worldwide, and online. She also created a capsule collection for Byredo in the same year.

Laila is based in New York but works worldwide on location, most often in London, Paris, Milan and Venice.

== WORK ==
Gohar’s collaborators include: Prada, Hermès, Comme des Garçons, Perrier-Jouët, Sotheby’s and The Glenlivet.

== GOHAR WORLD ==
Founded by sisters Laila & Nadia Gohar in 2020, Gohar World is a tableware universe that embraces craft, time, tradition, and humor. Created in family-owned ateliers to bring people together around the table, their surrealist tabletop objects tell a story of time.

[1][2][3][4][5]
