= Mohd Hamdan Abdullah =

Malaysian politician

Allahyarham Tun Mohd Hamdan Abdullah SMN
- محمد حمدان عبدﷲ
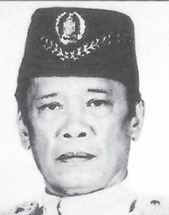

4th Yang di-Pertua Negeri of Sabah
- In office 28 July 1975 – 10 October 1977
- Chief Minister: See list: Mustapha Harun Mohammad Said Keruak Fuad Stephens Harris Salleh
- Preceded by: Fuad Stephens
- Succeeded by: Ahmad Koroh

Personal details
- Born: Indan bin Kari; 22 February 1922 Kampung Labuaya, Tuaran, British North Borneo
- Died: 10 October 1977 (aged 55) Kota Kinabalu, Sabah, Malaysia
- Party: USNO (1961–1975)
- Spouse(s): 1. Selisir Judi; 2. Toh Puan Dulimah
- Children: four sons and two daughters
- Parent(s): Kari Angur (deceased); Boyod Umpun (deceased)

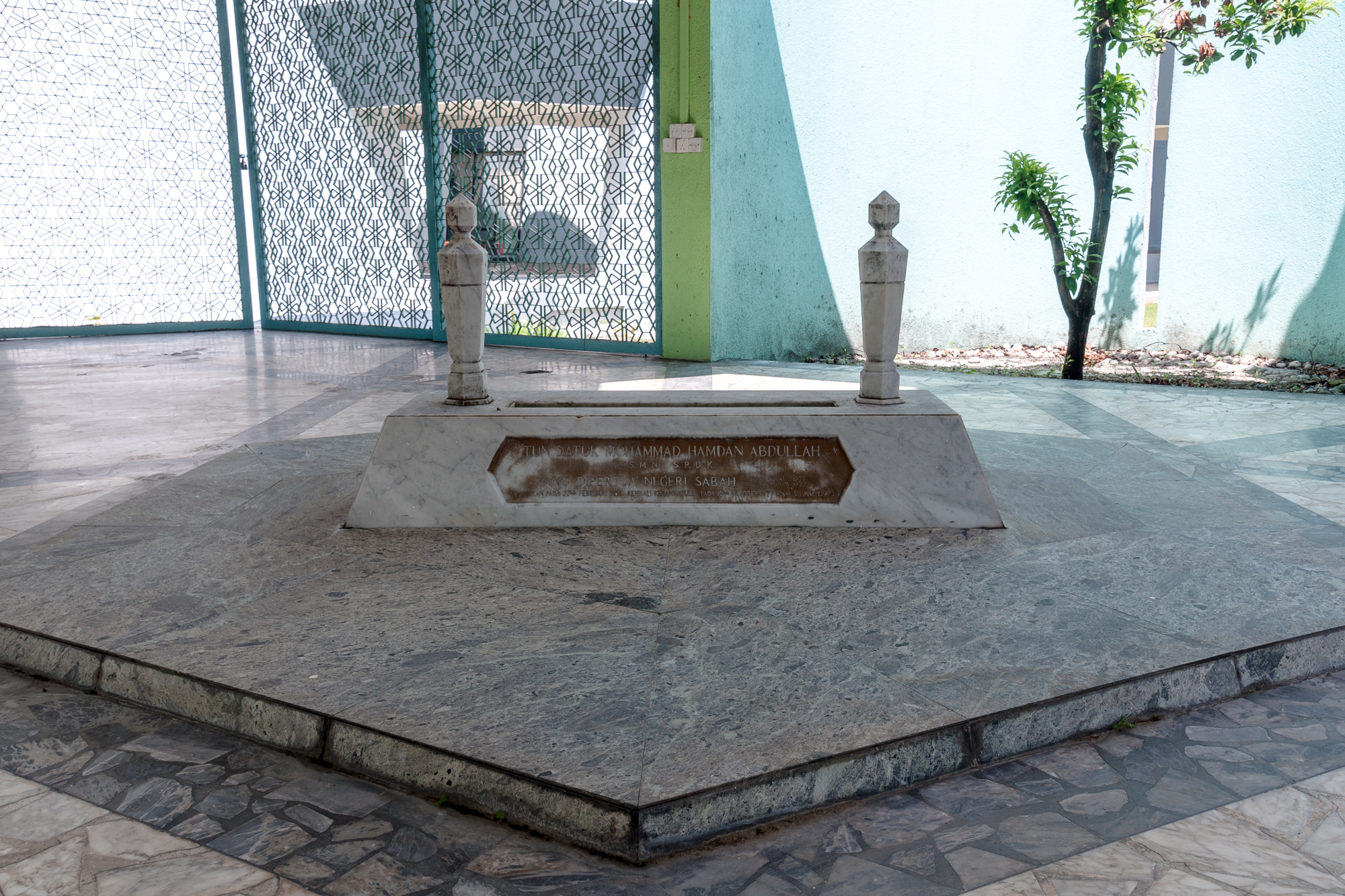

Mohd Hamdan bin Abdullah (né Indan bin Kari, born 22 February 1922 – 10 October 1977) was the fourth Governor of the Malaysian state of Sabah.

== Personal life ==
Tun Mohd Hamdan was born on 22 February 1922 at Kampung Labuaya, Tuaran, British North Borneo. He came from an ethnic Lotud Dusun family, which was the majority tribe of the local Kadazan-Dusun people of the Tuaran Valley (comprising today of the Tuaran District and its surrounding sub-districts of Tamparuli as well as Kiulu, including the villages of Topokon and Tenghilan near its border with Kota Belud District and also the suburban township of Telipok in Sabah's capital city of Kota Kinabalu, of which this township was formerly a part of since historically Telipok was under this district's jurisdiction during the colonial days and it was a boundary area marker between Kota Kinabalu city and Tuaran district).

His father, Orang Kaya Kaya Kari bin Angur, who was a colonial policeman posted in Gaya Island, died just before Tun Mohd Hamdan was born. After his father's death, he was raised by his mother and uncle.

== Education ==
Tun Mohd Hamdan received his early education at St. John's Primary School in Tuaran from 1929 to 1934. He then later studied at the Government Vernacular Secondary School (present-day SMK Badin) also in Tuaran from 1935 until 1940.

== Family ==
Tun Mohd Hamdan firstly married Toh Puan Selisir binti Judi, who was also an ethnic Lotud Dusun. They had two children, a son named Lintang and a daughter named Tahira. When Tun Mohd Hamdan converted to Islam from animism in 1962, Selisir chose to remain an animist, whilst her children remained Muslim. Nevertheless, she remained Hamdan's wife until his death in 1977. Selisir herself died in 2003.

In 1962, Tun Mohd Hamdan married a second wife, Toh Puan Dulimah binti Ampit, also a Lotud Dusun but a fellow Muslim adherent like him (despite that he was only a convert to the faith). They had three sons and a daughter and this marriage also lasted until Tun Hamdan's death.

== Career ==
Tun Mohd Hamdan started his career in 1942 as a Native Clerk under the British North Borneo Chartered Company administration. He was assigned at various districts such as Papar, Penampang, Pensiangan and Tambunan. In 1947, he was appointed as a Native Chief in Tuaran before being promoted as District Chief in 1958. In 1960, he took early retirement at 38 years of age in order to be fully active in politics.

== Second World War ==
During the Japanese occupation of North Borneo, Tun Mohd Hamdan joined an underground guerilla movement which aimed to fight the Japanese Army and to help the allied forces to liberate North Borneo from the Japanese invaders. However, he was caught by the Japanese in Pensiangan and sentenced to death by execution. While waiting for his execution the next day, he was released by a kind-hearted Japanese soldier. After the war, on a visit to Tokyo, Tun Mohd Hamdan met and reconnected with the (retired) Japanese soldier who had saved his life from being captured and executed during the war.

== Political career ==
=== Formation of USNO ===
Tun Mohd Hamdan Abdullah was well known as one of the founding fathers of United Sabah National Organisation which also known as USNO. Together with Tun Mustapha as the party's first President, Tun Mohd Hamdan, who was elected Deputy President, played a great role in gaining supporters in order to achieve one of its main aims to campaign for independence and self-government for North Borneo.

In 1963, Tun Mohd Hamdan made his political debut when he won the Sulaman seat in the Legislative Council after defeating a candidate from United Pasokmomogun Kadazan Organisation in the first state legislative assembly elections.

=== Involvements in the state administration ===
In 1962, Tun Mohd Hamdan Abdullah was appointed as Temporary Member of the State Legislative Council. He was reelected in 1964 and 1967.

In 1968, he was appointed as Political Secretary to the Minister of Finance. In December 1971, he was appointed as the Director of Sabah Padi Board. As Director of the Board, Tun Mohd Hamdan made important changes to help improve the agricultural irrigation and drainage system in order to increase paddy production.

=== Governorship of Sabah (1975-1977) ===
On 28 July 1975, Tun Mohd Hamdan was appointed as Sabah's fourth Yang di-Pertua Negara (Governor) to replace Tun Haji Mohammad Fuad Stephens who resigned from the post. Before his appointment to the governorship on 26 July 1975, he resigned as USNO Deputy President. He made the decision to forge closer relationships with the Sabahan people.

During his tenure as Yang di-Pertua Negara of Sabah, Tun Mohd Hamdan presided over a series of political conflicts in Sabah which occurred in 1975 between Tun Mustapha and the United Sabah National Organisation (USNO) with Tun Fuad Stephens who had just resigned as Sabah's Yang di-Pertua Negara at that time. Tun Mustapha had resigned as Chief Minister of Sabah in 1975 and was replaced by his deputy, Mohammad Said Keruak. Tun Fuad Stephens had formed a new political party known as BERJAYA to achieve his aims in order to topple the USNO Government. This eventually led to the Sabah state election on 15 April 1976 which brought the end of USNO administration over Sabah and this led to the establishment of a new state government led by Tun Fuad Stephens as the fifth Chief Minister of Sabah.

The new administration was short-lived when Tun Fuad Stephens was killed in a tragic air crash which happened on 6 June 1976. Tun Mohd Hamdan later appointed Harris Salleh, Deputy Chief Minister under Tun Fuad as the sixth Chief Minister.

Tun Mohd Hamdan was a popular governor and state leader throughout his tenure. He liked to tour throughout Sabah on his official visits in order to get closer to the people. As governor, he struggled to improve the living conditions and social welfare of the people, especially farmers and people living in the rural areas.

== Death ==
Tun Mohd Hamdan died of heart failure at Istana Negeri, Kota Kinabalu on 10 October 1977. He was the first Sabah governor to die while still in office. He was buried at the Sabah State Heroes Mausoleum in the compound of Sabah State Mosque.

== Legacy ==
=== Namesakes ===
Several places were named after him, including:

- Tun Hamdan Community Hall, Tamparuli, Tuaran
- Tun Hamdan Theatre, an indoor venue located at the Yayasan Sabah building (Tun Mustapha Tower) in Likas, Kota Kinabalu.

== Honours ==
=== Honours of Malaysia ===
- Malaysia
  - Grand Commander of the Order of the Defender of the Realm (SMN) – Tun (1977)

Political offices
Preceded by Fuad Stephens	Yang di-Pertua Negeri of Sabah; 1975–1977	Succeeded by Ahmad Koroh
