= The Glenlivet =

Single malt Scotch whisky brand

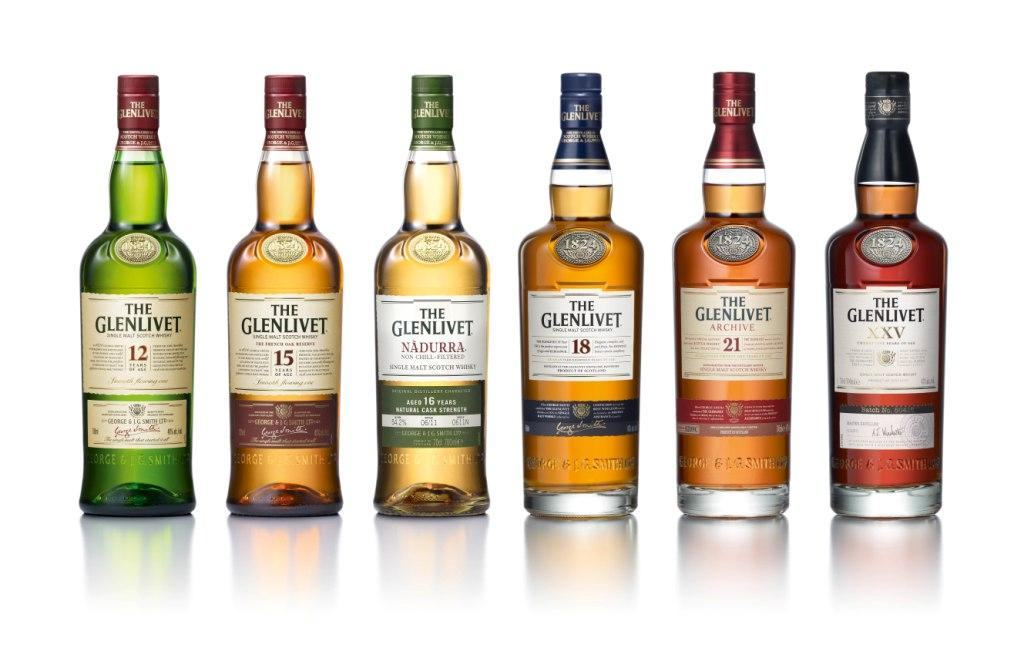
- Type: Single malt Scotch
- Manufacturer: Chivas Brothers (Pernod Ricard)
- Origin: Scotland
- Introduced: 1824
- Variants: 12 years old, 15 years old, 18 years old, 25 years old
- Website: www.theglenlivet.com

The Glenlivet is a Speyside single malt Scotch whisky brand founded in 1824 by George Smith in the Glenlivet valley of Scotland. Established following the Excise Act of 1823, it was the first legally licensed whisky producer in the Livet valley, within the Speyside region, and its whisky was used in 19th-century blended Scotch. It is owned by Chivas Brothers, a subsidiary of Pernod Ricard. According to industry data from the International Wine and Spirits Record (IWSR), The Glenlivet was the world’s best-selling single malt Scotch whisky by volume in 2014.

== History ==
=== Early history ===
In the early 19th century, the Glenlivet area in Scotland was known for illicit distillation. Whisky produced in the Glenlivet area had a reputation for quality. During a visit to Scotland in 1822, King George IV reportedly requested Glenlivet whisky.

=== Licensing ===
Following the Excise Act of 1823, George Smith obtained a licence in 1824 to distil legally in Glenlivet, and became the first licensed distiller in the Livet valley, within the Speyside region. This led to conflict with local illicit distillers and Smith reportedly carried pistols for protection.

=== Use in blended Scotch whisky ===
Glenlivet whisky was used both as a single malt and as a component in blended Scotch during the 19th century. Andrew Usher of Edinburgh began distributing Glenlivet whisky in the 1830s, became its agent in 1844, and in 1853 introduced Old Vatted Glenlivet, one of the first commercial blended whiskies.

=== Trademark dispute ===
By the mid 19th century, several distilleries were using “Glenlivet” as a suffix to their own name. George Smith and his son John Gordon Smith took steps to protect the brand’s identity, filing the name Glenlivet at Stationer’s Hall in London in 1859. Following the Trademark Registration Act 1875, John Gordon Smith applied for formal trademark protection. A High Court ruling in 1884 granted exclusive use of the definite article “The Glenlivet” to the Smith family for whisky produced at The Glenlivet distillery to distinguish it from other distilleries who were permitted to continue to use “Glenlivet” only in conjunction with their own names.

=== 20th century and later developments ===
After the repeal of Prohibition in the United States in 1933, The Glenlivet was among the early single malt Scotch whiskies promoted in the American market. During the mid-20th century, members of the Smith family, including Bill Smith Grant, developed export markets, and the brand was marketed internationally.

The Glenlivet remained in family ownership until 1952, after which it underwent a series of mergers and acquisitions, becoming part of Seagram in 1978. Following Seagram’s collapse in 2001, the brand was acquired by Pernod Ricard as part of the Chivas Brothers portfolio.

In 2024, the bicentenary of its first distilling licence was marked with limited releases, including a 12-year-old limited edition as well as the 55-year-old inaugural expression in The Glenlivet Eternal Collection. In 2025, the 56-year-old expression was released as the second release of the Eternal Collection.

== Product range ==
The Glenlivet range includes age-statement and non-age-statement (NAS) single malt Scotch whiskies. Core expressions include 12, 15 and 18-year-old bottlings, alongside NAS releases and limited editions. The Nàdurra range, introduced in the 2000s, consists of cask-strength and non-chill-filtered expressions. Higher-aged bottlings have been released under collections such as the Winchester Collection.

=== Core range ===
- The Glenlivet Founder’s Reserve
- The Glenlivet 12 Years Old
- The Glenlivet 14 Years Old Cognac Cask Selection
- The Glenlivet 15 Years Old French Oak
- The Glenlivet 18 Years Old Batch Reserve
- The Glenlivet Captain's Reserve

=== Premium and aged expressions ===
- The Glenlivet 21 Years Old
- The Glenlivet 25 Years Old
- The Glenlivet 40 Years Old
- The Glenlivet Winchester Collection 50 Years Old
- The Glenlivet 55 Years Old (200th Year Anniversary Edition; The Eternal Collection - First Release)
- The Glenlivet 56 Years Old (The Eternal Collection - Second Release)

=== Special editions and cask experiments ===
- The Glenlivet Nàdurra Peated Cask Single Malt Scotch Whisky
- The Glenlivet Fusion Cask Single Malt Scotch Whisky
- The Glenlivet The Master Distiller’s Reserve

== Market performance ==
According to the IWSR, The Glenlivet sold 1.065 million nine-litre cases in 2014, the highest reported volume among single malt Scotch whiskies that year.

== Sponsorships and partnerships ==
=== Sports ===
The Glenlivet partnered with Golf Canada in 2018 as the official spirits supplier for its National Open Championships, including the RBC Canadian Open and the CP Women's Open, where it hosted tasting areas and offered custom label experiences for attendees. In 2019, the brand served as a supporting partner for the RBC PGA Scramble presented by the Lincoln Motor Company in Canada, sponsoring a WildCard promotion for amateur golfers.

The Glenlivet served as a presenting sponsor for the 2008 International Players Tour (IPT) Tour Championship at Horseshoe Bay Resort in Texas, which included a tasting party event. The brand ran the Glenlivet Office Putting Championship involving companies in the Chicago business community. It was also a sponsor of the Captain's Trophy golf event in Kenya.

=== Fashion and lifestyle ===
In 2025, The Glenlivet collaborated with Nicholas Daley in connection with the launch of its Jamaica Edition, including plans for a capsule fashion collection incorporating Glenlivet-inspired tartan designs.

The Glenlivet collaborated with Thomas Doherty and Scottish textile manufacturer Lochcarron of Scotland to create a bespoke tartan as part of its bicentenary celebrations, reinterpreting the traditional Scottish pattern using colours inspired by the brand’s whisky and packaging.

In 2019, the brand partnered with Prabal Gurung during New York Fashion Week to promote the launch of the Glenlivet 14 Year Old Cognac Cask Selection, which included co-branded accessories and experiential events.

=== Art and design ===
The Glenlivet collaborated with Red Hong Yi on the first release of its Groundbreaker Collection, a travel-retail, limited-edition single malt whisky finished in red wine casks. The partnership incorporated Hong Yi’s use of traditional red pigments into the packaging design.

The Glenlivet collaborated with designer Bethan Gray on the Winchester Collection Vintage 1967, a limited-edition 50-year-old single malt, for which she designed the bottle and display case using materials and forms inspired by the distillery’s landscape and whisky-making process, representing the brand’s first collaboration with a designer on such a release.

To mark its 200th anniversary, The Glenlivet collaborated with Laila Gohar and her label Gohar World on a limited-edition set including glassware, candles and The Glenlivet Fusion Cask whisky.

The Glenlivet collaborated with Michael Hansmeyer on the first release of its Eternal Collection, a 55-year-old single malt whisky launched to mark the distillery’s bicentenary. The partnership involved the creation of a computationally designed sculptural vessel to house the decanter, combining digital design techniques with traditional craftsmanship and drawing inspiration from the Speyside landscape.

== Awards ==
The Glenlivet has received international awards across major competitions including the International Spirits Challenge (ISC), the International Wine and Spirit Competition (IWSC), the San Francisco World Spirits Competition (SFWSC), San Francisco Ready-to-Drink Competition (SFRTDC) and the World Whiskies Awards (WWA).

Year	Awarding Body	Product	Award	Ref.
2026	SFWSC	The Glenlivet 12 Years Old Single Malt Scotch Whisky	Double Gold	
2026	SFWSC	The Glenlivet 15 Years Old French Oak Single Malt Scotch Whisky	Double Gold	
2026	ISC	The Glenlivet 15 Years Old French Oak Single Malt Scotch Whisky	Gold	
2026	ISC	The Glenlivet 21 Years Old The Sample Room Collection Single Malt Scotch Whisky	Gold	
2026	IWSC	The Glenlivet 18 Years Old Batch Reserve Single Malt Scotch Whisky	Gold (96 pts)	
2026	IWSC	The Glenlivet 21 Years Old The Sample Room Collection Single Malt Scotch Whisky	Gold (95 pts)	
2026	WWA	The Glenlivet 21 Years Old The Sample Room Collection Single Malt Scotch Whisky	Gold	
2026	Scotch Whisky Masters	The Glenlivet 25 Years Old The Sample Room Collection Single Malt Scotch Whisky	Master	
2025	ISC	The Glenlivet 15 Years Old French Oak Single Malt Scotch Whisky	Double Gold	
2025	ISC	The Glenlivet 18 Years Old Batch Reserve Single Malt Scotch Whisky	Gold	
2025	ISC	The Glenlivet 21 Years Old The Sample Room Collection Single Malt Scotch Whisky	Gold	
2025	ISC	The Glenlivet 25 Years Old The Sample Room Collection Single Malt Scotch Whisky	Gold	
2025	ISC	The Glenlivet 12 Years Old Single Malt Scotch Whisky	Silver	
2025	ISC	The Glenlivet 12 Years Old Rum And Bourbon Cask Selection Single Malt Scotch Whisky (Taiwan Exclusive)	Silver	
2025	ISC	The Glenlivet 13 Years Old Sherry Cask Matured Single Malt Scotch Whisky (Taiwan Exclusive)	Silver	
2025	ISC	The Glenlivet 15 Years Old Sherry Cask Matured Single Malt Scotch Whisky (Taiwan Exclusive)	Silver	
2025	ISC	The Glenlivet Founder's Reserve Single Malt Scotch Whisky	Silver	
2025	ISC	The Glenlivet Groundbreaker Collection Chapter One: The Journey Inward Single Malt Scotch Whisky (Travel Exclusive)	Silver	
2025	ISC	The Glenlivet Caskmakers Single Malt Scotch Whisky	Bronze	
2025	ISC	The Glenlivet Eternal Collection 55 Years Old Single Malt Scotch Whisky	Bronze	
2025	IWSC	The Glenlivet 12 Years Old Rum And Bourbon Cask Selection Single Malt Scotch Whisky (Taiwan Exclusive)	Silver (92 pts)	
2025	IWSC	The Glenlivet 21 Years Old The Sample Room Collection Single Malt Scotch Whisky	Silver (91 pts)	
2025	IWSC	The Glenlivet 25 Years Old The Sample Room Collection Single Malt Scotch Whisky	Silver (93 pts)	
2025	IWSC	The Glenlivet Founder's Reserve Single Malt Scotch Whisky	Silver (90 pts)	
2025	IWSC	The Glenlivet Groundbreaker Collection Chapter One: The Journey Inward Single Malt Scotch Whisky (Travel Exclusive)	Silver (90 pts)	
2025	IWSC	The Glenlivet 15 Years Old Sherry Cask Matured Single Malt Scotch Whisky (Taiwan Exclusive)	Silver (94 pts)	
2025	IWSC	The Glenlivet 12 Years Old Single Malt Scotch Whisky	Silver (92 pts)	
2025	IWSC	The Glenlivet 12 Years Old Single Malt Scotch Whisky	Silver (92 pts)	
2025	IWSC	The Glenlivet 15 Years Old French Oak Single Malt Scotch Whisky	Silver (94 pts)	
2025	SFWSC	The Glenlivet Fusion Cask Single Malt Scotch Whisky	Silver	
2025	WWA	The Glenlivet 25 Years Old The Sample Room Collection Single Malt Scotch Whisky	Silver	
2025	WWA	The Glenlivet 12 Years Old Rum And Bourbon Cask Selection Single Malt Scotch Whisky (Taiwan Exclusive)	Silver	
2025	WWA	The Glenlivet Triple Cask Matured White Oak Reserve Single Malt Scotch Whisky	Silver	
2025	WWA	The Glenlivet Triple Cask Matured Rare Cask Single Malt Scotch Whisky	Silver	
2024	ISC	The Glenlivet 25 Years Old The Sample Room Collection Single Malt Scotch Whisky	Trophy	
2024	ISC	The Glenlivet 13 Years Old Sherry Cask Matured Single Malt Scotch Whisky (Taiwan Exclusive)	Double Gold	
2024	ISC	The Glenlivet 12 Years Old Rum And Bourbon Cask Selection Single Malt Scotch Whisky (Taiwan Exclusive)	Gold	
2024	ISC	The Glenlivet 12 Years Old Single Malt Scotch Whisky	Gold	
2024	ISC	The Glenlivet 15 Years Old French Oak Single Malt Scotch Whisky	Gold	
2024	ISC	The Glenlivet 15 Years Old Sherry Cask Matured Single Malt Scotch Whisky (Taiwan Exclusive)	Gold	
2024	ISC	The Glenlivet 21 Years Old The Sample Room Collection Single Malt Scotch Whisky	Gold	
2024	ISC	The Glenlivet Captain's Reserve Single Malt Scotch Whisky	Gold	
2024	ISC	The Glenlivet Caribbean Reserve Single Malt Scotch Whisky	Gold	
2024	ISC	The Glenlivet Caskmakers Single Malt Scotch Whisky	Gold	
2024	ISC	The Glenlivet Founder's Reserve Single Malt Scotch Whisky	Gold	
2024	ISC	The Glenlivet 18 Years Old Batch Reserve Single Malt Scotch Whisky	Silver	
2024	ISC	The Glenlivet Distiller's Reserve Triple Cask Matured Single Malt Scotch Whisky	Silver	
2024	IWSC	The Glenlivet 25 Years Old The Sample Room Collection Single Malt Scotch Whisky	Gold (95 pts)	
2024	IWSC	The Glenlivet 15 Years Old French Oak Single Malt Scotch Whisky	Silver (93 pts)	
2024	IWSC	The Glenlivet 18 Years Old Batch Reserve Single Malt Scotch Whisky	Silver (93 pts)	
2024	IWSC	The Glenlivet 21 Years Old The Sample Room Collection Single Malt Scotch Whisky	Silver (92 pts)	
2024	IWSC	The Glenlivet Captain's Reserve Single Malt Scotch Whisky	Silver (91 pts)	
2024	IWSC	The Glenlivet Caribbean Reserve Single Malt Scotch Whisky	Silver (91 pts)	
2024	IWSC	The Glenlivet Caskmakers Single Malt Scotch Whisky	Silver (92 pts)	
2024	IWSC	The Glenlivet 12 Years Old Single Malt Scotch Whisky	Silver (91 pts)	
2024	IWSC	The Glenlivet Founder's Reserve Single Malt Scotch Whisky	Silver (92 pts)	
2024	IWSC	The Glenlivet Fusion Cask Single Malt Scotch Whisky	Silver (90 pts)	
2024	IWSC	The Glenlivet Twist & Mix New Manhattan Scotch Whisky Cocktail	Silver (94 pts)	
2024	IWSC	The Glenlivet 12 Years Old Rum And Bourbon Cask Selection Single Malt Scotch Whisky (Taiwan Exclusive)	Silver (93 pts)	
2024	SFWSC	The Glenlivet Fusion Cask Single Malt Scotch Whisky	Silver	
2024	SFRTDC	The Glenlivet Twist & Mix New Manhattan Scotch Whisky Cocktail	Silver	
2024	SFRTDC	The Glenlivet Twist & Mix Old Fashioned Scotch Whisky Cocktail	Silver	
2024	WWA	The Glenlivet Distiller's Reserve Triple Cask Matured Single Malt Scotch Whisky	Silver	
2024	WWA	The Glenlivet 12 Years Old Single Malt Scotch Whisky	Silver	
2024	WWA	The Glenlivet 15 Years Old Sherry Cask Matured Single Malt Scotch Whisky (Taiwan Exclusive)	Silver	
2024	WWA	The Glenlivet 21 Years Old The Sample Room Collection Single Malt Scotch Whisky	Silver	
2024	WWA	The Glenlivet Distiller's Reserve Triple Cask Matured Single Malt Scotch Whisky	Silver	
2024	WWA	The Glenlivet Captain's Reserve Single Malt Scotch Whisky	Silver	
2023	ISC	The Glenlivet 12 Years Old Rum And Bourbon Cask Selection Single Malt Scotch Whisky (Taiwan Exclusive)	Gold	
2023	ISC	The Glenlivet 13 Years Old Sherry Cask Matured Single Malt Scotch Whisky (Taiwan Exclusive)	Gold	
2023	ISC	The Glenlivet 14 Years Old Cognac Cask Selection Single Malt Scotch Whisky	Gold	
2023	ISC	The Glenlivet 18 Years Old Batch Reserve Single Malt Scotch Whisky	Gold	
2023	ISC	The Glenlivet 21 Years Old The Sample Room Collection Single Malt Scotch Whisky	Gold	
2023	ISC	The Glenlivet 25 Years Old The Sample Room Collection Single Malt Scotch Whisky	Gold	
2023	ISC	The Glenlivet Distiller's Reserve Triple Cask Matured Single Malt Scotch Whisky	Gold	
2023	ISC	The Glenlivet Triple Cask Matured Rare Cask Single Malt Scotch Whisky	Gold	
2023	ISC	The Glenlivet 15 Years Old Sherry Cask Matured Single Malt Scotch Whisky (Taiwan Exclusive)	Silver	
2023	ISC	The Glenlivet Captain's Reserve Single Malt Scotch Whisky	Silver	
2023	ISC	The Glenlivet Caribbean Reserve Single Malt Scotch Whisky	Silver	
2023	ISC	The Glenlivet Founder's Reserve Single Malt Scotch Whisky	Silver	
2023	IWSC	The Glenlivet 15 Years Old French Oak Single Malt Scotch Whisky	Gold (95 pts)	
2023	IWSC	The Glenlivet Triple Cask Matured Rare Cask Single Malt Scotch Whisky	Gold (95 pts)	
2023	IWSC	The Glenlivet 18 Years Old Batch Reserve Single Malt Scotch Whisky	Gold (95 pts)	
2023	IWSC	The Glenlivet 12 Years Old Rum And Bourbon Cask Selection Single Malt Scotch Whisky (Taiwan Exclusive)	Gold (95 pts)	
2023	IWSC	The Glenlivet 12 Years Old Rum And Bourbon Cask Selection Single Malt Scotch Whisky (Taiwan Exclusive) "Whisky Highball" in partnership with Franklin & Sons	Silver	
2023	IWSC	The Glenlivet Captain's Reserve Single Malt Scotch Whisky	Silver (94 pts)	
2023	IWSC	The Glenlivet Caribbean Reserve Single Malt Scotch Whisky	Silver (94 pts)	
2023	IWSC	The Glenlivet 21 Years Old The Sample Room Collection Single Malt Scotch Whisky	Silver (94 pts)	
2023	IWSC	The Glenlivet 13 Years Old Sherry Cask Matured Single Malt Scotch Whisky (Taiwan Exclusive)	Silver (93 pts)	
2023	IWSC	The Glenlivet 15 Years Old Sherry Cask Matured Single Malt Scotch Whisky (Taiwan Exclusive)	Silver (92 pts)	
2023	IWSC	The Glenlivet Founder's Reserve Single Malt Scotch Whisky	Silver (92 pts)	
2023	IWSC	The Glenlivet 25 Years Old The Sample Room Collection Single Malt Scotch Whisky	Silver (91 pts)	
2023	IWSC	The Glenlivet Distiller's Reserve Triple Cask Matured Single Malt Scotch Whisky	Silver (90 pts)	
2023	IWSC	The Glenlivet Triple Cask Matured White Oak Reserve Single Malt Scotch Whisky	Silver (90 pts)	
2023	SFWSC	The Glenlivet 18 Years Old Batch Reserve Single Malt Scotch Whisky	Double Gold	
2023	SFWSC	The Glenlivet 14 Years Old Cognac Cask Selection Single Malt Scotch Whisky	Double Gold	
2023	SFWSC	The Glenlivet 25 Years Old The Sample Room Collection Single Malt Scotch Whisky	Double Gold	
2023	SFWSC	The Glenlivet 21 Years Old The Sample Room Collection Single Malt Scotch Whisky	Silver	
2023	SFWSC	The Glenlivet Caribbean Reserve Single Malt Scotch Whisky	Silver	
2023	WWA	The Glenlivet 15 Years Old French Oak Single Malt Scotch Whisky	Gold	
2023	WWA	The Glenlivet 21 Years Old Archive Single Malt Scotch Whisky	Best Scotch Speyside Single Malt Category Winner	
2023	WWA	The Glenlivet 12 Years Old Rum And Bourbon Cask Selection Single Malt Scotch Whisky (Taiwan Exclusive)	Category Winner	
2023	WWA	The Glenlivet 12 Years Old Rum And Bourbon Cask Selection Single Malt Scotch Whisky (Taiwan Exclusive)	Gold	
2022	ISC	The Glenlivet 15 Years Old Sherry Cask Matured Single Malt Scotch Whisky (Taiwan Exclusive)	Gold	
2022	ISC	The Glenlivet 15 Years Old French Oak Single Malt Scotch Whisky	Gold	
2022	ISC	The Glenlivet 25 Years Old The Sample Room Collection Single Malt Scotch Whisky	Gold	
2022	ISC	The Glenlivet Captain's Reserve Single Malt Scotch Whisky	Gold	
2022	ISC	The Glenlivet Nàdurra First Fill Single Malt Scotch Whisky	Gold	
2022	ISC	The Glenlivet Distiller's Reserve Triple Cask Matured Single Malt Scotch Whisky	Gold	
2022	ISC	The Glenlivet Triple Cask Matured White Oak Reserve Single Malt Scotch Whisky	Gold	
2022	ISC	The Glenlivet 21 Years Old Archive Single Malt Scotch Whisky	Gold	
2022	ISC	The Glenlivet Distiller's Reserve Triple Cask Matured Single Malt Scotch Whisky	Gold	
2022	ISC	The Glenlivet 12 Years Old Rum And Bourbon Cask Selection Single Malt Scotch Whisky (Taiwan Exclusive)	Silver	
2022	ISC	The Glenlivet 13 Years Old Sherry Cask Matured Single Malt Scotch Whisky (Taiwan Exclusive)	Silver	
2022	ISC	The Glenlivet Caribbean Reserve Single Malt Scotch Whisky	Silver	
2022	ISC	The Glenlivet Founder's Reserve Single Malt Scotch Whisky	Silver	
2022	ISC	The Glenlivet 12 Years Old Single Malt Scotch Whisky	Silver	
2022	IWSC	The Glenlivet 25 Years Old The Sample Room Collection Single Malt Scotch Whisky	Gold (95 pts)	
2022	IWSC	The Glenlivet 18 Years Old Batch Reserve Single Malt Scotch Whisky	Gold (96 pts)	
2022	IWSC	The Glenlivet 21 Years Old The Sample Room Collection Single Malt Scotch Whisky	Gold (95 pts)	
2022	IWSC	The Glenlivet Founder's Reserve Single Malt Scotch Whisky	Silver (94 pts)	
2022	IWSC	The Glenlivet 12 Years Old Single Malt Scotch Whisky	Silver (94 pts)	
2022	IWSC	The Glenlivet 13 Years Old Sherry Cask Matured Single Malt Scotch Whisky (Taiwan Exclusive)	Silver (94 pts)	
2022	IWSC	The Glenlivet 12 Years Old Rum And Bourbon Cask Selection Single Malt Scotch Whisky (Taiwan Exclusive)	Silver (93 pts)	
2022	IWSC	The Glenlivet 15 Years Old Sherry Cask Matured Single Malt Scotch Whisky (Taiwan Exclusive)	Silver (93 pts)	
2022	IWSC	The Glenlivet 15 Years Old French Oak Single Malt Scotch Whisky	Silver (93 pts)	
2022	IWSC	The Glenlivet Caribbean Reserve Single Malt Scotch Whisky	Silver (92 pts)	
2022	SFWSC	The Glenlivet Caribbean Reserve Single Malt Scotch Whisky	Gold	
2022	SFWSC	The Glenlivet 12 Years Old Single Malt Scotch Whisky	Double Gold	
2022	SFWSC	The Glenlivet 14 Years Old Cognac Cask Selection Single Malt Scotch Whisky	Silver	
2022	SFWSC	The Glenlivet 18 Years Old Batch Reserve Single Malt Scotch Whisky	Silver	
2021	ISC	The Glenlivet Triple Cask Matured White Oak Reserve Single Malt Scotch Whisky	Gold	
2021	ISC	The Glenlivet Captain's Reserve Single Malt Scotch Whisky	Gold	
2021	ISC	The Glenlivet Nàdurra First Fill Single Malt Scotch Whisky	Gold	
2021	ISC	The Glenlivet 15 Years Old French Oak Single Malt Scotch Whisky	Gold	
2021	ISC	The Glenlivet Distiller's Reserve Triple Cask Matured Single Malt Scotch Whisky	Gold	
2021	ISC	The Glenlivet 12 Years Old Single Malt Scotch Whisky	Gold	
2021	ISC	The Glenlivet 18 Years Old Batch Reserve Single Malt Scotch Whisky	Gold	
2021	ISC	The Glenlivet Caribbean Reserve Single Malt Scotch Whisky	Silver	
2021	ISC	The Glenlivet Founder's Reserve Single Malt Scotch Whisky	Silver	
2021	ISC	The Glenlivet Distiller's Reserve Triple Cask Matured Single Malt Scotch Whisky	Silver	
2021	ISC	The Glenlivet Nàdurra Oloroso Single Malt Scotch Whisky	Silver	
2021	IWSC	The Glenlivet Triple Cask Matured Rare Cask Single Malt Scotch Whisky	Gold (95 pts)	
2021	IWSC	The Glenlivet 18 Years Old Batch Reserve Single Malt Scotch Whisky	Gold (95 pts)	
2021	IWSC	The Glenlivet Nàdurra Oloroso Single Malt Scotch Whisky	Silver (94 pts)	
2021	IWSC	The Glenlivet 13 Years Old Sherry Cask Matured Single Malt Scotch Whisky (Taiwan Exclusive)	Silver (94 pts)	
2021	IWSC	The Glenlivet Captain's Reserve Single Malt Scotch Whisky	Silver (93 pts)	
2021	IWSC	The Glenlivet Caribbean Reserve Single Malt Scotch Whisky	Silver (93 pts)	
2021	IWSC	The Glenlivet Founder's Reserve Single Malt Scotch Whisky	Silver (93 pts)	
2021	IWSC	The Glenlivet 12 Years Old Single Malt Scotch Whisky	Silver (92 pts)	
2021	IWSC	The Glenlivet Triple Cask Matured White Oak Reserve Single Malt Scotch Whisky	Silver (92 pts)	
2021	IWSC	The Glenlivet Distiller's Reserve Triple Cask Matured Single Malt Scotch Whisky	Silver (90 pts)	
2021	WWA	The Glenlivet Distiller's Reserve Triple Cask Matured Single Malt Scotch Whisky	Silver	
2021	WWA	The Glenlivet 18 Years Old Batch Reserve Single Malt Scotch Whisky	Silver	
2020	ISC	The Glenlivet Founder's Reserve Single Malt Scotch Whisky	Gold	
2020	ISC	The Glenlivet Triple Cask Matured White Oak Reserve Single Malt Scotch Whisky	Gold	
2020	ISC	The Glenlivet Distiller's Reserve Triple Cask Matured Single Malt Scotch Whisky	Gold	
2020	ISC	The Glenlivet Nàdurra First Fill Single Malt Scotch Whisky	Gold	
2020	ISC	The Glenlivet 13 Years Old Sherry Cask Matured Single Malt Scotch Whisky (Taiwan Exclusive)	Gold	
2020	ISC	The Glenlivet 15 Years Old French Oak Single Malt Scotch Whisky	Gold	
2020	ISC	The Glenlivet 15 Years Old Sherry Cask Matured Single Malt Scotch Whisky (Taiwan Exclusive)	Gold	
2020	ISC	The Glenlivet Triple Cask Matured Rare Cask Single Malt Scotch Whisky	Gold	
2020	ISC	The Glenlivet 12 Years Old Single Malt Scotch Whisky	Gold	
2020	ISC	The Glenlivet 18 Years Old Batch Reserve Single Malt Scotch Whisky	Gold	
2020	ISC	The Glenlivet Captain's Reserve Single Malt Scotch Whisky	Silver	
2020	ISC	The Glenlivet Nàdurra Oloroso Single Malt Scotch Whisky	Silver	
2020	IWSC	The Glenlivet 12 Years Old Single Malt Scotch Whisky	Silver (91 pts)	
2020	IWSC	The Glenlivet 14 Years Old Cognac Cask Selection Single Malt Scotch Whisky	Silver (93 pts)	
2020	IWSC	The Glenlivet 15 Years Old French Oak Single Malt Scotch Whisky	Silver (91 pts)	
2020	IWSC	The Glenlivet 18 Years Old Batch Reserve Single Malt Scotch Whisky	Silver (93 pts)	
2020	IWSC	The Glenlivet Captain's Reserve Single Malt Scotch Whisky	Silver (93 pts)	
2020	IWSC	The Glenlivet Caribbean Reserve Single Malt Scotch Whisky	Silver (92 pts)	
2020	IWSC	The Glenlivet Nàdurra First Fill Single Malt Scotch Whisky	Silver (91 pts)	
2020	IWSC	The Glenlivet Nàdurra Oloroso Single Malt Scotch Whisky	Silver (94 pts)	
2020	IWSC	The Glenlivet Triple Cask Matured Rare Cask Single Malt Scotch Whisky	Silver (91 pts)	
2019	ISC	The Glenlivet 18 Years Old Batch Reserve Single Malt Scotch Whisky	Gold	
2019	ISC	The Glenlivet 12 Years Old Single Malt Scotch Whisky	Silver	
2019	ISC	The Glenlivet Nàdurra Peated Cask Single Malt Scotch Whisky	Silver	
2019	IWSC	The Glenlivet 15 Years Old French Oak Single Malt Scotch Whisky	Gold (95 pts)	
2019	IWSC	The Glenlivet 18 Years Old Batch Reserve Single Malt Scotch Whisky	Gold (98 pts)	
2019	IWSC	The Glenlivet Founder's Reserve Single Malt Scotch Whisky	Gold (95 pts)	
2018	ISC	The Glenlivet 12 Years Old Single Malt Scotch Whisky	Silver	
2018	ISC	The Glenlivet The Master Distiller’s Reserve Single Malt Scotch Whisky	Silver	
2018	ISC	The Glenlivet The Master Distiller's Reserve Solera Vatted Single Malt Scotch Whisky	Silver	
2018	ISC	The Glenlivet 15 Years Old French Oak Single Malt Scotch Whisky	Gold	
2018	ISC	The Glenlivet 18 Years Old Batch Reserve Single Malt Scotch Whisky	Gold	
2018	IWSC	The Glenlivet 15 Years Old French Oak Single Malt Scotch Whisky	Gold Outstanding	
2018	IWSC	The Glenlivet Founder's Reserve Single Malt Scotch Whisky	Gold Outstanding	
2018	IWSC	The Glenlivet The Master Distiller's Reserve Small Batch Single Malt Scotch Whisky	Gold	
2017	ISC	The Glenlivet 15 Years Old French Oak Single Malt Scotch Whisky	Silver	
2017	ISC	The Glenlivet 18 Years Old Batch Reserve Single Malt Scotch Whisky	Silver	
2017	ISC	The Glenlivet Founder's Reserve Single Malt Scotch Whisky	Silver	
2017	ISC	The Glenlivet Nàdurra Peated Cask Single Malt Scotch Whisky	Silver	
2017	ISC	The Glenlivet Nàdurra First Fill Single Malt Scotch Whisky	Silver	
2017	ISC	The Glenlivet The Master Distiller's Reserve Small Batch Single Malt Scotch Whisky	Silver	
2017	ISC	The Glenlivet The Master Distiller’s Reserve Single Malt Scotch Whisky	Silver	
2017	IWSC	The Glenlivet 15 Years Old French Oak Single Malt Scotch Whisky	Gold	
2017	IWSC	The Glenlivet 18 Years Old Batch Reserve Single Malt Scotch Whisky	Gold	
2017	IWSC	The Glenlivet Founder's Reserve Single Malt Scotch Whisky	Gold	
2016	ISC	The Glenlivet The Master Distiller’s Reserve Single Malt Scotch Whisky	Gold	
2016	ISC	The Glenlivet Founder's Reserve Single Malt Scotch Whisky	Silver	
2016	ISC	The Glenlivet Nàdurra Peated Cask Single Malt Scotch Whisky	Silver	
2016	ISC	The Glenlivet Nàdurra Oloroso Single Malt Scotch Whisky	Silver	
2016	ISC	The Glenlivet Nàdurra First Fill Single Malt Scotch Whisky	Silver	
2016	ISC	The Glenlivet The Master Distiller's Reserve Solera Vatted Single Malt Scotch Whisky	Silver	
2016	ISC	The Glenlivet The Master Distiller's Reserve Small Batch Single Malt Scotch Whisky	Silver	
2016	IWSC	The Glenlivet Founder's Reserve Single Malt Scotch Whisky	Gold	
2015	ISC	The Glenlivet 25 Years Old The Sample Room Collection Single Malt Scotch Whisky	Gold	
2015	ISC	The Glenlivet 12 Years Old Single Malt Scotch Whisky	Silver	
2015	ISC	The Glenlivet Nàdurra Oloroso Single Malt Scotch Whisky	Silver	
2015	ISC	The Glenlivet Nàdurra First Fill Single Malt Scotch Whisky	Silver	
2015	ISC	The Glenlivet Founder's Reserve Single Malt Scotch Whisky	Silver	
2015	ISC	The Glenlivet 18 Years Old Batch Reserve Single Malt Scotch Whisky	Silver	
2015	IWSC	The Glenlivet 25 Years Old The Sample Room Collection Single Malt Scotch Whisky	Gold	
2014	ISC	The Glenlivet Guardians' Chapter	Trophy	
2014	ISC	The Glenlivet 12 Years Old Single Malt Scotch Whisky	Gold	
2014	ISC	The Glenlivet 25 Years Old The Sample Room Collection Single Malt Scotch Whisky	Gold	
2014	ISC	The Glenlivet 18 Years Old Batch Reserve Single Malt Scotch Whisky	Gold	
2014	ISC	The Glenlivet Nàdurra 16 Years Old Single Malt Scotch Whisky	Trophy	
2014	ISC	The Glenlivet The Master Distiller’s Reserve Single Malt Scotch Whisky	Silver	
2014	ISC	The Glenlivet 15 Years Old French Oak Single Malt Scotch Whisky	Silver	
2014	ISC	The Glenlivet 21 Years Old Archive Single Malt Scotch Whisky	Silver	
2014	IWSC	The Glenlivet Nàdurra Oloroso Single Malt Scotch Whisky	Gold	
2014	IWSC	The Glenlivet Nàdurra 16 Years Old Single Malt Scotch Whisky	Gold	
2014	IWSC	The Glenlivet 15 Years Old French Oak Single Malt Scotch Whisky	Gold	
2014	IWSC	The Glenlivet 21 Years Old The Sample Room Collection Single Malt Scotch Whisky	Gold	
2013	ISC	The Glenlivet Alpha Single Malt Scotch Whisky	Trophy	
2013	ISC	The Glenlivet The Master Distiller’s Reserve Single Malt Scotch Whisky	Gold	
2013	ISC	The Glenlivet 12 Years Old Single Malt Scotch Whisky	Gold	
2013	ISC	The Glenlivet 21 Years Old Archive Single Malt Scotch Whisky	Gold	
2013	ISC	The Glenlivet 25 Years Old The Sample Room Collection Single Malt Scotch Whisky	Gold	
2013	ISC	The Glenlivet 15 Years Old French Oak Single Malt Scotch Whisky	Gold	
2013	ISC	The Glenlivet 18 Years Old Batch Reserve Single Malt Scotch Whisky	Gold	
2013	ISC	The Glenlivet Nàdurra 16 Years Old Single Malt Scotch Whisky	Gold	
2013	ISC	The Glenlivet 12 Years Old Excellence Single Malt Scotch Whisky	Silver	
2012	ISC	The Glenlivet 12 Years Old Single Malt Scotch Whisky	Gold	
2012	ISC	The Glenlivet 18 Years Old Batch Reserve Single Malt Scotch Whisky	Gold	
2012	ISC	The Glenlivet Guardians' Chapter	Gold	
2012	ISC	The Glenlivet 12 Years Old First Fill Single Malt Scotch Whisky	Silver	
2012	ISC	The Glenlivet The Master Distiller’s Reserve Single Malt Scotch Whisky	Silver	
2012	ISC	The Glenlivet Nàdurra 16 Years Old Single Malt Scotch Whisky	Silver	
2011	ISC	The Glenlivet 18 Years Old Batch Reserve Single Malt Scotch Whisky	Gold	
2011	ISC	The Glenlivet 12 Years Old Single Malt Scotch Whisky	Silver	
2011	ISC	The Glenlivet 25 Years Old The Sample Room Collection Single Malt Scotch Whisky	Silver	
2011	ISC	The Glenlivet Founder's Reserve Single Malt Scotch Whisky	Silver	
2011	ISC	The Glenlivet 15 Years Old French Oak Single Malt Scotch Whisky	Silver	
