= Red Hong Yi =

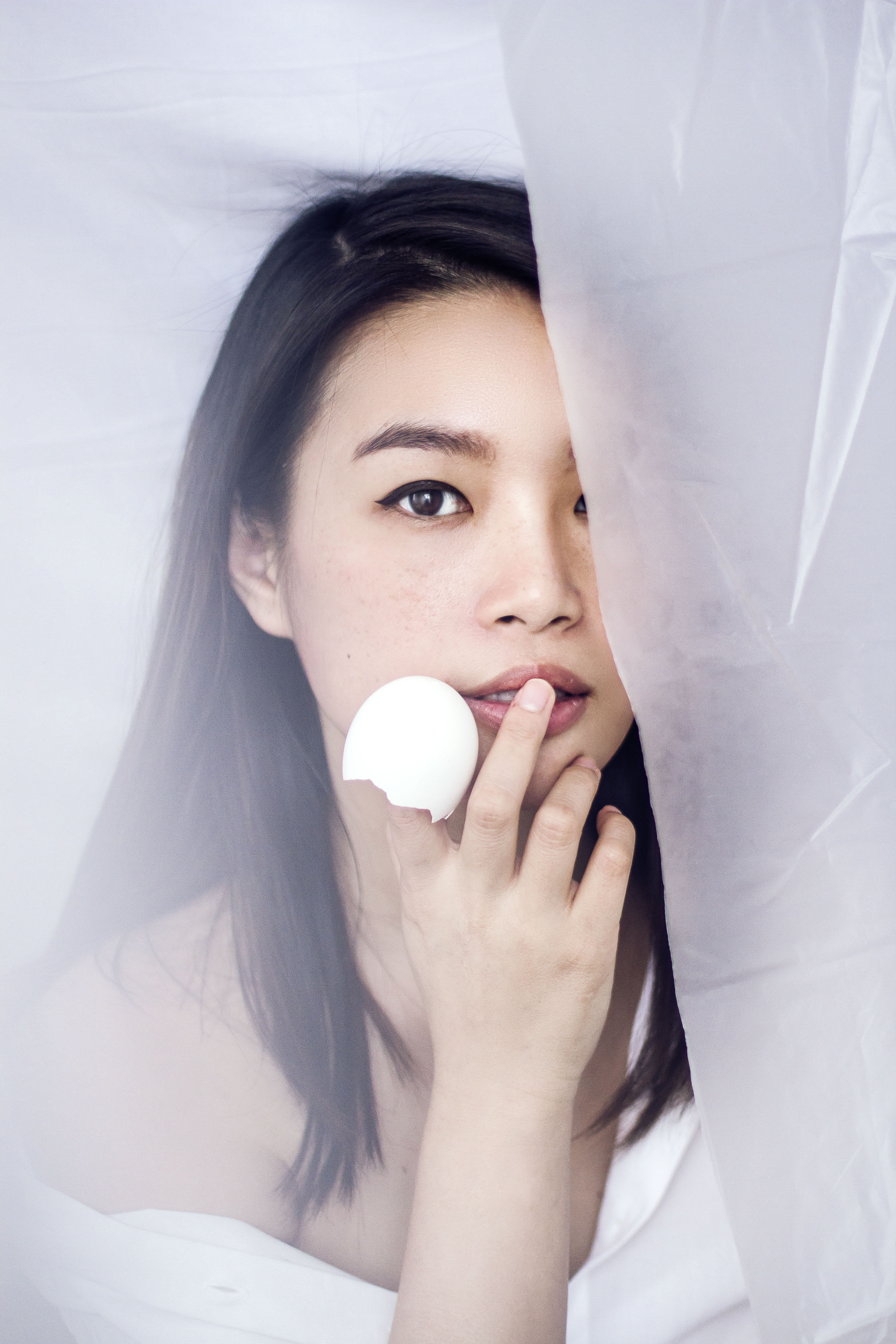
A picture of the Malaysian artist Red Hong Yi with eggshells, shoot for her series "Future Relics", a series of unique paintings using the iconography of Chinese classical art to express the themes of women, femininity and female sensibility in the 21st century.

Hong Yi is a Malaysian born artist and architectural designer better known by her moniker, 'Red'. She is known for using everyday objects and materials for her paintings and art installations to transform our understanding of objects and image-making, as an artist who 'paints without a paintbrush'.

== Early life and education ==
Red was born in Kota Kinabalu, Sabah, Malaysia. In 2004, she attended the Foundation Studies program at Trinity College (University of Melbourne), and subsequently graduated with a Bachelor of Planning and Design in 2007 and a Master of Architecture in 2010 from the University of Melbourne before moving to Shanghai to work for Australian architecture firm HASSELL. Captivated by her new environment in Shanghai, Red was inspired to create artwork that documented this new chapter of her life, and uploaded videos of her work online went viral. She was encouraged by her boss to take a six-month sabbatical to explore her career in art before quitting to be a full-time artist in January 2013. In May 2019, she was awarded the inaugural Foundation Studies Alumna of the Year Award by Trinity College (University of Melbourne) for her contribution to the visual arts.

== Work ==
Inspired by China's production power and abundance of materials found in wholesale markets, Red discovered her style of art by using materials in bulk to create portraits of well-known Chinese personalities. Her other work includes a portrait of Ai Weiwei with seven kilograms of sunflower seeds as a tribute to his porcelain Sunflower Seeds installation, Chinese filmmaker Zhang Yimou with 2000 socks, singer Jay Chou with coffee cup stains as a tribute to his song "Secret", Aung Saan Su Kyi with 2000 dyed carnations noting the way she ties flowers in her hair, and singer Adele with thousands of melted tealight candles as a tribute to her song, "Set Fire to the Rain".

Her work has been sought after by clients around the world and she has been invited to speak in conferences internationally. In 2014, Jackie Chan commissioned her to create a portrait of himself with 64,000 chopsticks for his 60th birthday, and video of the artwork has been watched 1.9million times on YouTube. In 2015, she was invited to present her work, 'Teh Tarik Man', made of 20,000 dyed teabags, during Malaysian Night at the World Economic Forum in Davos, Switzerland. She was named as the top 12 'Brilliant Malaysians' and 'Brilliant Artist Award' by Esquire Magazine, awarded Perspective's 40 Under 40 award as a creative who will shape the design world in the years to come, and one of the 19 "Future Chasers" by Australia Unlimited as future decision-makers of courage, imagination and will.

Red has traveled to Cambodia to meet her sponsored child and to raise awareness of conditions there, in partnership with World Vision.

Red has created a series in response to anti-Asian racism related to the COVID-19 pandemic. She was listed as one of the most influential voices in Asia in May 2020 by Tatler Hong Kong.

In a collaboration with Pos Malaysia, Red designed a stamp honouring Malaysia's frontline workers, which was released in 2021. The design for the stamps were made out of thousands of postage stamps.

In 2024, Red collaborated with The Glenlivet on The Groundbreaker travel-retail collection using traditional red pigments for the packaging design.

== Popular culture ==
In July 2018, the JPMorgan Chase Bank commenced an advertising campaign that showcased their QuickPay payment service. The video, titled "Chase Presents Red's Way," shows her using the payment service to transfer $1000 to her father so that he might come to see an exhibit of hers.

The video later shows them reuniting at the entrance of a building. Inside the building, they both walk towards her exhibit, "Tiger in Tea Leaves," a work she completed that year which is dedicated to her father. The dedication reads "To Baba: The Strongest man I know" ("Baba" means Dad in Chinese).
