= Sakaran Dandai =

Malaysian politician (1930–2021)

Yang Amat Berbahagia Tun Datuk Seri Panglima Sakaran Dandai SMN SPDK SSAP DP DUNM PSLJ PSM PGDK ADK JP
- ساکران محمد هاشم دانداي
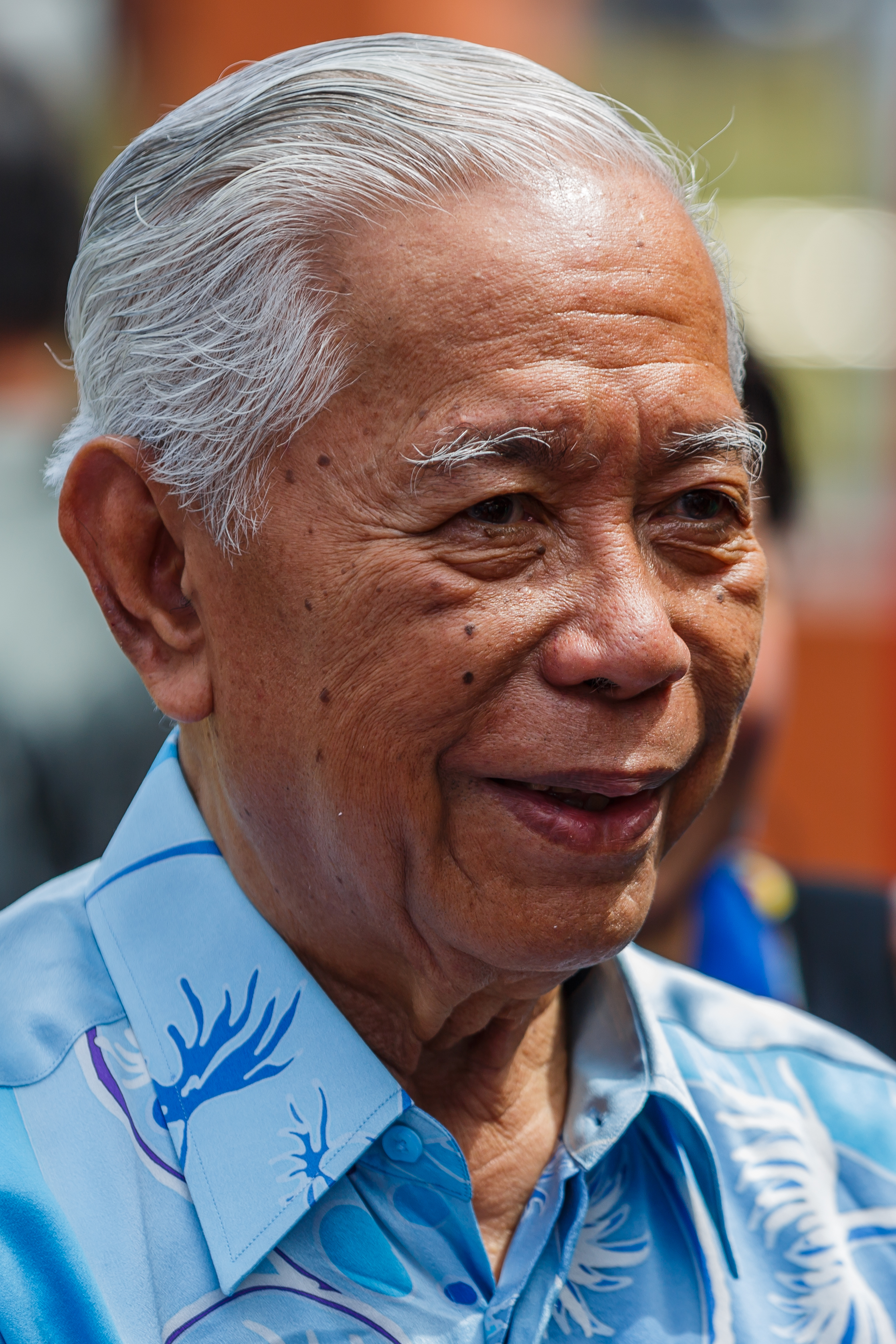

8th Yang di-Pertua Negeri of Sabah
- In office 1 January 1995 – 31 December 2002
- Chief Minister: Salleh Said Keruak; Yong Teck Lee; Bernard Giluk Dompok; Osu Sukam; Chong Kah Kiat
- Preceded by: Mohammad Said Keruak
- Succeeded by: Ahmadshah Abdullah

8th Chief Minister of Sabah
- In office 17 March 1994 – 27 December 1994
- Governor: Mohammad Said Keruak
- Deputy: Salleh Said Keruak; Joseph Kurup; Yong Teck Lee
- Preceded by: Joseph Pairin Kitingan
- Succeeded by: Salleh Said Keruak

Member of the Malaysian Parliament for Semporna
- In office 3 August 1986 – 25 April 1995
- Preceded by: New constituency
- Succeeded by: Shafie Apdal

Personal details
- Born: Sakaran Mohd Hashim bin Dandai; 15 April 1930 Kampung Air, Semporna, North Borneo
- Died: 30 August 2021 (aged 91) Kota Kinabalu, Sabah, Malaysia
- Resting place: Makam Pahlawan, Masjid Negeri Sabah, Kota Kinabalu
- Party: United Sabah National Organization (USNO); United Malays National Organisation (UMNO)
- Other political affiliations: Barisan Nasional (BN)
- Spouse(s): Halimah (deceased); Siti Rukaiyah Abdullah
- Parent: Dandai Ajibuddin (deceased) (father)
- Relatives: Shafie Apdal (nephew); Yusof Apdal (nephew and son-in-law)

Sakaran Mohd Hashim bin Dandai (15 April 1930 – 30 August 2021) was a Malaysian politician.

== Biography ==
He served as the 8th Yang di-Pertua Negeri of Sabah from January 1995 to December 2002, 8th Chief Minister of Sabah briefly from March 1994 to December 1994 and Member of Parliament (MP) for Semporna from August 1986 to April 1995. In 1990, he was appointed as the Minister of Lands and Co-operatives Development by Prime Minister Mahathir Mohamad.

In August 2021, Sakaran Dandai was diagnosed with COVID-19 and admitted to intensive care unit (ICU) at Gleneagles Hospital, Kota Kinabalu. On 30 August at 5:30 a.m., Sakaran aged 91, died due to COVID-19. He was buried at Makam Pahlawan near the Sabah State Mosque in Kota Kinabalu.

== Election results ==
Parliament of Malaysia
Year	Constituency	Candidate	Votes	Pct	Opponent(s)	Votes	Pct	Ballots cast	Majority	Turnout
1986	P153 Semporna, Sabah	Sakaran Dandai (USNO)	6,063	51.26%	Abdillah Abdul Hamid (BERJAYA)	4,116	34.80%	11,947	1,947	51.56%
1986	P153 Semporna, Sabah	Sakaran Dandai (USNO)	6,063	51.26%	Jendy Jeffery (IND)	1,650	13.95%	11,947	1,947	51.56%
1990	P153 Semporna, Sabah	Sakaran Dandai (UMNO)	10,832	58.85%	Abdillah Abdul Hamid (IND)	7,574	41.15%	18,566	3,258	57.77%

== Awards and recognitions ==
=== Honours of Malaysia ===
- Malaysia
  - Commander of the Order of Loyalty to the Crown of Malaysia (PSM) – Tan Sri (1990)
  - Grand Commander of the Order of the Defender of the Realm (SMN) – Tun (1996)
- Sabah
  - Companion of the Order of Kinabalu (ASDK)
  - Commander of the Order of Kinabalu (PGDK) – Datuk
  - Grand Commander of the Order of Kinabalu (SPDK) – Datuk Seri Panglima
- Pahang
  - Grand Knight of the Order of Sultan Ahmad Shah of Pahang (SSAP) – Dato' Sri
- Malacca
  - Knight Grand Commander of the Premier and Exalted Order of Malacca (DUNM) – Datuk Seri Utama (1996)
- Sarawak
  - Knight Grand Commander of the Order of the Star of Hornbill Sarawak (DP) – Datuk Patinggi

=== Foreign honours ===
- Brunei
  - Grand Commander of the Order of Paduka Seri Laila Jasa (PSLJ) – Dato Paduka Seri Laila Jasa

=== Places named after him ===
Several places were named after him, including:

- Tun Sakaran Marine Park in Semporna, Sabah
- Tun Sakaran Museum in Semporna, Sabah
- SMK Agama Tun Sakaran, a secondary school in Semporna, Sabah

== See also ==
- List of deaths due to COVID-19 - notable individual deaths

Political offices
Preceded by Joseph Pairin Kitingan	Chief Minister of Sabah; March 1994–June 1994	Succeeded by Salleh Said Keruak
Preceded by Mohammad Said Keruak	Yang di-Pertua Negeri of Sabah; 1995–2002	Succeeded by Ahmadshah Abdullah
