= Zaykiel Leong =

Malaysian footballer

Personal information
- Full name: Zaykiel Leong
- Date of birth: 9 November 1980 (age 45)
- Place of birth: Sabah, Malaysia
- Position: Striker

Team information
- Current team: Sabah FA

Youth career
- Sabah FA President's Cup

Senior career*
Years	Team	Apps	(Gls)
2002–2005	Sabah FA	?	(12)
2007	Beverly FC		
2009–	Sabah FA		
- * Club domestic league appearances and goals as of 4 May 2009

Zaykiel Leong (born 9 November 1980) is a Malaysian footballer who plays as a striker for Sabah FA in Malaysia Premier League.

Zaykiel has represented Sabah since 2002. He made it into the first eleven games during the 2003 season. He showed impressive playing style during the 2003 season as he netted 8 goals during the season and helped Sabah to reach the final of Malaysia Cup, but failed to win the cup after losing 3–0 to Selangor MPPJ by Juan Arostegui from Argentina.

For the 2009 season, he returned to play for Sabah after previously playing for Beverly FC in 2007.
