= Ahmad Koroh =

Malaysian politician (1925–1978)

Allahyarham Tun Ahmad Koroh SMN
- أحمد کوروه

5th Yang di-Pertua Negeri of Sabah
- In office 12 October 1977 – 25 June 1978
- Preceded by: Mohd Hamdan Abdullah
- Succeeded by: Mohamad Adnan Robert

Personal details
- Born: Thomas Koroh; 1 January 1925 Kampung Limbawan, Keningau, North Borneo
- Died: 25 June 1978 (aged 53) Kota Kinabalu, Sabah, Malaysia
- Spouses: Philippa Sinirun Matamit (died 1947): Salamah Said Besar Sigoh (co-wife; polygamy); Hamidah Fadzil (co-wife; polygamy after conversion to Islam)
- Relations: Datuk Sedomon Gunsanad (uncle); OKK Gunsanad Kina (grandfather); Datuk G.S. Sundang (uncle)
- Parent(s): Koroh Santul (deceased); Maria Isah OKK Gunsanad (deceased)

Ahmad Koroh (né Thomas Koroh, born 1 January 1925 – 25 June 1978) was the fifth Governor of the Malaysian state of Sabah.

He was the nephew of Sedomon Gunsanad Kina as well as the matriline grandson of Gunsanad Kina through his mother, Maria Isah and the second Governor to die in office just like his predecessor, Tun Mohd Hamdan Abdullah at the young age of 53, only after less than a year in office.

== Honours ==
=== Honours of Malaysia ===
- Malaysia
  - Grand Commander of the Order of the Defender of the Realm (SMN) – Tun (1978)

Political offices
Preceded by Mohd Hamdan Abdullah	Yang di-Pertua Negeri of Sabah; 1977–1978	Succeeded by Mohamad Adnan Robert
