= Shafie Apdal =

Malaysian politician (born 1957)

Yang Berhormat Datuk Seri Panglima Haji Shafie Apdal SPDK SPMP PNBS PGDK DMSM DSAP PKN JP MP MLA
- شافعي أڤضل
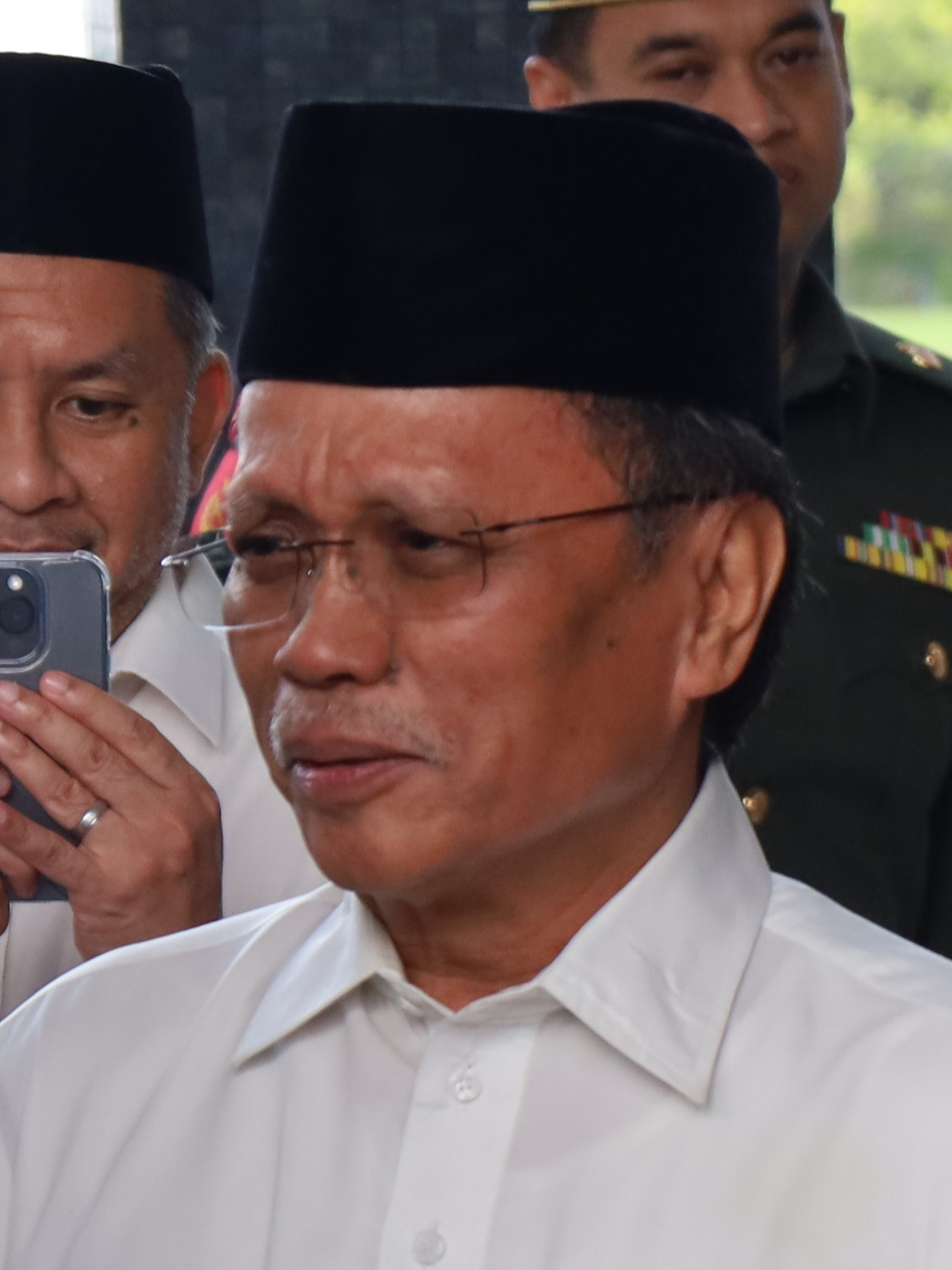
- Shafie in 2025

15th Chief Minister of Sabah
- In office 12 May 2018 – 29 September 2020
- Governor: Juhar Mahiruddin
- Deputy: Wilfred Madius Tangau; Christina Liew; Jaujan Sambakong
- Preceded by: Musa Aman
- Succeeded by: Hajiji Noor
- Constituency: Senallang

Federal Ministerial Roles
- 1995–1999: Parliamentary Secretary of Information
- 1999: Deputy Minister of Housing and Local Government
- 1999–2004: Deputy Minister of Defence
- 2004–2008: Minister of Domestic Trade and Consumerism
- 2008–2009: Minister of National Unity, Arts, Culture and Heritage
- 2009–2015: Minister of Rural and Regional Development

1st President of the Heritage Party
- Incumbent
- Assumed office 17 October 2016
- Deputy: Darell Leiking
- Preceded by: Position established

Faction represented in Dewan Rakyat
- 1995–2016: Barisan Nasional
- 2016–: Heritage Party

Faction represented in the Sabah State Legislative Assembly
- 2018–: Heritage Party

Personal details
- Born: Mohd Shafie bin Apdal; 20 October 1957 (age 69) Semporna, Crown Colony of North Borneo (now Sabah, Malaysia)
- Party: United Sabah National Organisation (USNO) (1983–1995); United Malays National Organisation of Sabah (Sabah UMNO) (1995–2016); Heritage Party (WARISAN) (since 2016)
- Other political affiliations: Barisan Nasional (BN) (1983–2016)
- Spouse: Shuryani Shuaib
- Relations: Yusof Apdal (brother); Yamin Apdal (brother); Rusnah Apdal (sister); Nasir Sakaran (cousin); Sakaran Dandai (maternal uncle); Shuaib Lazim (father-in-law)
- Children: 6
- Education: Sabah College; Victoria Institution
- Alma mater: North Staffordshire Polytechnic (BEc)
- Occupation: Politician

Mohd Shafie bin Apdal (Jawi: محمد شافعي بن أڤضل; born 20 October 1957) is a Malaysian politician who has served as the Member of Parliament (MP) for Semporna since April 1995, State Leader of the Opposition of Sabah since September 2020 and Member of the Sabah State Legislative Assembly (MLA) for Senallang since May 2018. He served as the 15th Chief Minister and the State Minister of Finance of Sabah from May 2018 to September 2020, Minister of Rural and Regional Development from April 2009 to July 2015 and Vice President of the United Malays National Organisation (UMNO), a component party of the Barisan Nasional (BN) coalition. He has served as the 1st and founding President of Heritage Party (WARISAN) since October 2016. He lost the power as Chief Minister of Sabah following the defeat of his coalition WARISAN+ in the 2020 state election.

== Early life and education ==
Mohd. Shafie bin Apdal was born on 20 October 1957 in Semporna, Sabah, into a Bajau and Suluk family. He is the nephew of Sakaran Dandai, who was the eighth Governor of Sabah and eighth Chief Minister of Sabah.

Shafie completed his secondary education in Victoria Institution, Kuala Lumpur (but attended Sabah College, Kota Kinabalu for his middle school). He has a Diploma in Shipping Management from the London Business College (not to be confused with the London Business School). In 1992, he received his Bachelor in Economics (Hons) from North Staffordshire Polytechnic, England.

== Political career ==
Shafie started his political career with the United Sabah National Organisation (USNO). The party dissolved in 1994, and Shafie joined UMNO, which was then only starting to gain a presence in the state. In 1995 he was elected to federal Parliament as an UMNO member, for the seat of Semporna. He was appointed a parliamentary secretary before becoming Deputy Minister of Housing and Local Government in 1999. From 1999 to 2004, he was Deputy Minister for Defence.

After the 2004 election, he was appointed Minister of Domestic, Trade and Consumer Affairs in Prime Minister Abdullah Ahmad Badawi's Cabinet and was later given the Ministry of Unity, Culture, Arts and Heritage. On 10 April 2009, he became the Minister of Rural and Regional Development in the first Cabinet of Prime Minister Najib Razak. This coincided with his election to one of the party's three vice-presidential posts, polling in third place behind Ahmad Zahid Hamidi and Hishammuddin Hussein. He was re-elected as an UMNO vice-president in 2013, this time polling in second place, behind Ahmad Zahid and ahead of Hishammuddin. He is the first Sabahan to hold a vice-presidency of UMNO.

On 28 July 2015, Shafie was removed in the Cabinet reshuffle by Najib thus losing his rural and regional development portfolio. Following this, he formed a new Sabah-based opposition party known as WARISAN that was approved by Registrar of Societies (RoS) on 17 October 2016.

=== Appointment as a Chief Minister ===
In the 2018 general election, Shafie's party of WARISAN together with the coalition of Pakatan Harapan (PH) are tied up with 29-29 seats with BN in the 2018 Sabah state election. Jeffrey Kitingan with his party of Homeland Solidarity Party (STAR) under the United Sabah Alliance (USA) which are not aligned from either the two sides, has won two seats in the election and subsequently emerged as the decision maker for the formation of a state government from the two sides. Jeffrey then decide to team up with the BN to form coalition state government with him appointed as a Deputy Chief Minister after Shafie Apdal the president of WARISAN disagreed to Jeffrey's permission to make Sabah's IC and solving the Illegal Immigrant issues in Sabah. Jeffrey Kitingan became the Deputy Chief Minister while Musa Aman from BN to become the Chief Minister for another 5 years under the new coalition government (Coalition of BN-GBS). However, situation change when six seats assemblymen from the BN allied parties of United Pasokmomogun Kadazandusun Murut Organisation (UPKO) and United Sabah People's Party (PBRS) switched their allegiance to WARISAN, giving Shafie an advantage with 35 seats which is sufficient to establish a valid state government. Earlier, Musa Aman had already sworn in as Chief Minister following the help of two seats from STAR. This situation left Sabah with two ruling Chief Ministers, the second in its history since the dispute between PBS and USNO in 1980s. The results of this events sparks a constitutional crisis in Sabah, and the need to review and change the current constitution so as to curb the "allegiance switching" of assemblymen, after the swearing-in ceremony of the chief minister. Another four seats assemblymen from BN allied parties of UMNO and UPKO switching their allegiance to WARISAN on 13 May 2018. The Yang di-Pertua Negeri Juhar Mahiruddin also had requested for Musa to step down, despite Musa still stressing that he still the rightful Chief Minister. Musa was then issued a letter from the TYT that he is no longer the Chief Minister effective from 12 May 2018 that was delivered into his residence on 14 May 2018. On 7 November, the high court in Kota Kinabalu decided that Shafie remained the legitimate Chief Minister of Sabah and dismissed a suit made by Musa who claimed his dismissal as chief minister was illegal and against the state constitution.

On 30 July 2020, upon the political manoeuvring in Sabah, he announced that the Yang di-Pertua Negeri Juhar Mahiruddin had agreed to dissolve the Sabah State Legislative Assembly to hold a state election in his audience with Juhar.

On 27 September 2020, his party lost its majority in the Sabah Election to the Gabungan Rakyat Sabah (GRS) led by Hajiji Noor. This made way for Hajiji to swear-in as the new Chief Minister of Sabah. After leaving office as the Chief Minister of Sabah, Shafie consistently and vocally criticised Hajiji and his GRS administration over their handling of a number of issues such as the water crisis in the state.

== Personal life ==
He is married to Shuryani Shuaib and has six children.

== Election results ==
Parliament of Malaysia
Year	Constituency	Candidate	Votes	Pct	Opponent(s)	Votes	Pct	Ballots cast	Majority	Turnout
1995	P164 Semporna	Mohd Shafie Apdal (Sabah UMNO)	17,006	78.03%	Sabardin Ombrah (PBS)	4,788	21.97%	22,197	12,218	66.59%
1999	P164 Semporna	Mohd Shafie Apdal (Sabah UMNO)	18,570	77.98%	Abdul Rahim (IND)	5,245	22.02%	24,155	13,325	58.48%
2004	P189 Semporna	Mohd Shafie Apdal (Sabah UMNO)	15,215	76.25%	Madjalis Lais (IND)	1,896	9.50%	20,918	13,319	61.94%
2004	P189 Semporna	Mohd Shafie Apdal (Sabah UMNO)	15,215	76.25%	Aldani Landi (IND)	1,286	6.44%	20,918	13,319	61.94%
2004	P189 Semporna	Mohd Shafie Apdal (Sabah UMNO)	15,215	76.25%	Nuraidah Abdul Salleh (IND)	816	4.09%	20,918	13,319	61.94%
2004	P189 Semporna	Mohd Shafie Apdal (Sabah UMNO)	15,215	76.25%	Abdul Wahab Abdullah (PKR)	740	3.71%	20,918	13,319	61.94%
2008	P189 Semporna	Mohd Shafie Apdal (Sabah UMNO)	19,419	90.84%	Abd Azis Abd Hamid (PKR)	1,957	9.16%	22,209	17,462	63.07%
2013	P189 Semporna	Mohd Shafie Apdal (Sabah UMNO)	25,559	83.70%	Zamree @ Mohd Suffian Abdul Habi (PKR)	4,654	15.24%	31,595	20,905	76.04%
2013	P189 Semporna	Mohd Shafie Apdal (Sabah UMNO)	25,559	83.70%	Datu Badaruddin Mustapha (IND)	325	1.06%	31,595	20,905	76.04%
2018	P189 Semporna	Mohd Shafie Apdal (WARISAN)	26,809	80.20%	Ramlee Marahaban (Sabah UMNO)	6,135	18.35%	34,613	20,674	71.74%
2018	P189 Semporna	Mohd Shafie Apdal (WARISAN)	26,809	80.20%	Abdul Nasir Ab Raup (PAS)	384	1.15%	34,613	20,674	71.74%
2018	P189 Semporna	Mohd Shafie Apdal (WARISAN)	26,809	80.20%	Asmara Asmad (PHRS)	98	0.29%	34,613	20,674	71.74%
2022	P189 Semporna	Mohd Shafie Apdal (WARISAN)	28,702	73.77%	Nixon Abdul Habi (Sabah BERSATU)	7,892	20.28%	39,978	20,810	53.91%
2022	P189 Semporna	Mohd Shafie Apdal (WARISAN)	28,702	73.77%	Arastam Pandorog (PKR)	1,848	4.75%	39,978	20,810	53.91%
2022	P189 Semporna	Mohd Shafie Apdal (WARISAN)	28,702	73.77%	Ab Rajik Ab Hamid (PEJUANG)	467	1.2%	39,978	20,810	53.91%

Sabah State Legislative Assembly
Year	Constituency	Candidate	Votes	Pct	Opponent(s)	Votes	Pct	Ballots cast	Majority	Turnout
2018	N53 Senallang	Mohd Shafie Apdal (WARISAN)	7,754	75.97%	Nasir Sakaran (Sabah UMNO)	2,453	24.03%	10,514	5,301	73.02%
2020	N65 Senallang	Mohd Shafie Apdal (WARISAN)	6,363	77.16%	Norazman Utoh Nain (Sabah BERSATU)	1,732	21.01%	8,246	4,631	57.52%
2020	N65 Senallang	Mohd Shafie Apdal (WARISAN)	6,363	77.16%	Mohammad Ramzan Abdu Wahab (USNO (Baru))	61	0.74%	8,246	4,631	57.52%
2020	N65 Senallang	Mohd Shafie Apdal (WARISAN)	6,363	77.16%	Madjalis KK Lais (PCS)	51	0.62%	8,246	4,631	57.52%
2020	N65 Senallang	Mohd Shafie Apdal (WARISAN)	6,363	77.16%	Pg Ahmad Datu Ali Alam (PPRS)	39	0.47%	8,246	4,631	57.52%
2025	N65 Senallang	Mohd Shafie Apdal (WARISAN)	8,751	79.61%	Marunda KK Ampong (GAGASAN)	1,914	17.41%	11,246	6,837	54.36%
2025	N65 Senallang	Mohd Shafie Apdal (WARISAN)	8,751	79.61%	Mohd Lipai @ Samsu Sundalu (IMPIAN)	196	1.78%	11,246	6,837	54.36%
2025	N65 Senallang	Mohd Shafie Apdal (WARISAN)	8,751	79.61%	Abdul Majid Angkulan (MUPP)	131	1.19%	11,246	6,837	54.36%

== Honours ==
=== Honours of Malaysia ===
- Malaysia
  - Recipient of the National Sovereignty Medal (PKN) (2014)
  - Recipient of the 17th Yang di-Pertuan Agong Installation Medal (2025)
- Sabah
  - Grand Commander of the Order of Kinabalu (SPDK) – Datuk Seri Panglima (2011)
  - Commander of the Order of Kinabalu (PGDK) – Datuk (1994)
  - Justice of the Peace (JP) (2000)
- Malacca
  - Companion Class I of the Exalted Order of Malacca (DMSM) – Datuk (2002)
- Pahang
  - Knight Companion of the Order of Sultan Ahmad Shah of Pahang (DSAP) – Dato' (2003)
- Perlis
  - Knight Grand Commander of the Order of the Crown of Perlis (SPMP) – Dato' Seri (2008)
- Sarawak
  - Knight Commander of the Most Exalted Order of the Star of Sarawak (PNBS) – Dato Sri (2014)

Political offices
Preceded by Musa Aman	Chief Minister of Sabah; 2018–2020	Succeeded by Hajiji Noor
