= Mohamad Adnan Robert =

Malaysian politician (1917-2003)

Allahyarham Tun Datuk Seri Panglima Mohamad Adnan Robert SMN SPDK DUPN
- محمد عدنان روبرت

6th Yang di-Pertua Negeri of Sabah
- In office 25 June 1978 – 31 December 1986
- Preceded by: Ahmad Koroh
- Succeeded by: Mohammad Said Keruak

Personal details
- Born: Michael Robert; 10 September 1917 Jesselton, North Borneo
- Died: 2 August 2003 (aged 85) Donggongon, Penampang, Sabah, Malaysia
- Spouse: Mariam Tseu

Mohamad Adnan Robert (né Michael Robert, born 10 September 1917 – 2 August 2003) was the sixth Governor of the Malaysian state of Sabah.

== Honours ==
=== Honour of Malaysia ===
- Malaysia
  - Grand Commander of the Order of the Defender of the Realm (SMN) – Tun (1979)
- Sabah
  - Grand Commander of the Order of Kinabalu (SPDK) – Datuk Seri Panglima (1981)
- Penang
  - Knight Grand Commander of the Order of the Defender of State (DUPN) – Dato' Seri Utama (1981)

Political offices
Preceded by Ahmad Koroh	Yang di-Pertua Negeri of Sabah; 1978–1986	Succeeded by Mohammad Said Keruak
