= Senallang =

Senallang (N65)
Sabah constituency

State constituency
- Legislature: Sabah State Legislative Assembly
MLA
Shafie Apdal
Heritage
- Constituency created: 1994
- First contested: 1995
- Last contested: 2025

Demographics
- Electors (2025): 20,763

Senallang is a state constituency in Sabah, Malaysia, that has been represented in the Sabah State Legislative Assembly.

== Demographics ==
As of 2020, Senallang has a population of 57,231 people.

Ethnic breakdown of Senallang's electorate as of 2025
1. Muslim Bumiputera (91.0%)
2. Non-Muslim Bumiputera (5.00%)
3. Chinese (3.00%)
4. Other ethnicities (1.00%)

== History ==
=== Polling districts ===
According to the gazette issued on 31 October 2022, the Senallang constituency has a total of 11 polling districts.

| State constituency | Polling Districts | Code | Location |
|---|---|---|---|
| Senallang（N65） | Pekan Semporna | 189/65/01 | SK Pekan Semporna |
| Senallang（N65） | Tampi-Tampi | 189/65/02 | SK Tampi-Tampi |
| Senallang（N65） | Kabogan | 189/65/03 | SK Kabogan |
| Senallang（N65） | Pakalangan | 189/65/04 | SK Kampung Pokas |
| Senallang（N65） | Tagasan | 189/65/05 | SMK Tagasan |
| Senallang（N65） | Mantaritip | 189/65/06 | SK Pegagu |
| Senallang（N65） | Musallah | 189/65/07 | SK Pekan Semporna II |
| Senallang（N65） | Inabah Kamal | 189/65/08 | SA Tun Sakaran |
| Senallang（N65） | Pulau Mabul | 189/65/09 | SK Pulau Mabul |
| Senallang（N65） | Bukit Lalang | 189/65/10 | SK Bukit Lalang |
| Senallang（N65） | Kubang Baru | 189/65/11 | SK Kubang Pinang |

=== Representation history ===
Member of Sabah State Legislative Assembly for Senallang
| Assembly | No | Years | Member | Party |
Constituency created from Sulabayan
| 11th | N44 | 1999 – 2004 | Nasir Sakaran | BN (UMNO) |
| 12th | N53 | 2004 – 2008 | Nasir Sakaran | BN (UMNO) |
| 13th | N53 | 2008 – 2013 | Nasir Sakaran | BN (UMNO) |
| 14th | N53 | 2013 – 2018 | Nasir Sakaran | BN (UMNO) |
| 15th | N53 | 2018 – 2020 | Mohd Shafie Apdal | WARISAN |
| 16th | N65 | 2020 – 2025 | Mohd Shafie Apdal | WARISAN |
| 17th | N65 | 2025–present | Mohd Shafie Apdal | WARISAN |

== Election results ==
Sabah state election, 2025: Senallang
| Party | Candidate | Votes | % | ∆% |
|---|---|---|---|---|
| Heritage | Shafie Apdal | 8,751 | 79.61 | ▲4.28 |
| GRS | Marunda K K Ampong | 1,914 | 17.41 | ▲17.41 |
| Sabah Dream Party | Mohd Lipai @ Samsu Sundalu | 196 | 1.78 | ▲1.78 |
| MUPP | Abdul Majid Angkulan | 131 | 1.19 | ▲1.19 |
| Total valid votes | | 10,992 | | |
| Total rejected ballots | | 254 | | |
| Unreturned ballots | | 41 | | |
| Turnout | | 11,287 | 54.36 | ▼4.56 |
| Registered electors | | 20,763 | | |
| Majority | | 6,837 | 62.20 | ▲1.09 |
| Heritage hold | | Swing | | |
Source(s) "RESULTS OF CONTESTED ELECTION AND STATEMENTS OF THE POLL AFTER THE OFFICIAL ADDITION OF VOTES" (PDF).

Sabah state election, 2020: Senallang
| Party | Candidate | Votes | % | ∆% |
|---|---|---|---|---|
| Sabah Heritage Party | Shafie Apdal | 6,363 | 75.33 | ▲1.58 |
| PN | Norazman Utoh Nain | 1,201 | 14.22 | ▲14.22 |
| USNO (Baru) | Mohammad Ramzan Abdul Wahab | 61 | 0.72 | ▲0.72 |
| Love Sabah Party | Madjalis Lais | 51 | 0.60 | ▲0.60 |
| Sabah People's Unity Party | Ahmad Alialam | 39 | 0.46 | ▲0.46 |
| Total valid votes | | 8,246 | 97.62 | |
| Total rejected ballots | | 163 | 1.93 | |
| Unreturned ballots | | 38 | 0.45 | |
| Turnout | | 8,447 | 58.92 | ▼14.10 |
| Registered electors | | 14,336 | | |
| Majority | | 4,631 | 61.11 | ▲10.69 |
| Sabah Heritage Party hold | | Swing | | |
Source(s) "RESULTS OF CONTESTED ELECTION AND STATEMENTS OF THE POLL AFTER THE OFFICIAL ADDITION OF VOTES".

Sabah state election, 2018: Senallang
| Party | Candidate | Votes | % | ∆% |
|---|---|---|---|---|
| Sabah Heritage Party | Shafie Apdal | 7,754 | 73.75 | ▲73.75 |
| BN | Nasir Sakaran | 2,453 | 23.33 | ▼49.85 |
| Total valid votes | | 10,207 | 97.08 | |
| Total rejected ballots | | 244 | 2.32 | |
| Unreturned ballots | | 63 | 0.60 | |
| Turnout | | 10,514 | 73.02 | ▼3.79 |
| Registered electors | | 14,399 | | |
| Majority | | 5,301 | 50.42 | ▼7.82 |
| Sabah Heritage Party gain from BN | | Swing | | ? |
Source(s) "RESULTS OF CONTESTED ELECTION AND STATEMENTS OF THE POLL AFTER THE OFFICIAL ADDITION OF VOTES".

Sabah state election, 2013: Senallang
| Party | Candidate | Votes | % | ∆% |
|---|---|---|---|---|
| BN | Nasir Sakaran | 7,425 | 73.18 | ▼10.88 |
| PKR | Mohd Amin Abdul Mem | 1,516 | 14.94 | ▲6.84 |
| Independent | Abdul Manang Hatib Lawari @ Osman | 546 | 5.38 | ▲5.38 |
| Independent | Badaruddin Mustapha | 164 | 1.62 | ▲1.62 |
| Independent | Abdul Karim Talip | 145 | 1.43 | ▲1.43 |
| Total valid votes | | 9,796 | 96.55 | |
| Total rejected ballots | | 326 | 3.21 | |
| Unreturned ballots | | 24 | 0.24 | |
| Turnout | | 10,146 | 76.81 | ▲13.25 |
| Registered electors | | 13,210 | | |
| Majority | | 5,909 | 58.24 | ▼11.82 |
| BN hold | | Swing | | |
Source(s) "KEPUTUSAN PILIHAN RAYA UMUM DEWAN UNDANGAN NEGERI". Archived from the original on 2022-10-11.

Sabah state election, 2008: Senallang
| Party | Candidate | Votes | % | ∆% |
|---|---|---|---|---|
| BN | Nasir Sakaran | 6,083 | 78.46 | ▲7.81 |
| Independent | Asmara Asmad | 651 | 8.40 | ▲8.40 |
| PKR | Hasaman Sagaran | 628 | 8.10 | ▲3.08 |
| Independent | Mohd Sayadi Bakal | 0 | 0.00 | |
| Total valid votes | | 7,362 | 94.96 | |
| Total rejected ballots | | 366 | 4.72 | |
| Unreturned ballots | | 25 | 0.32 | |
| Turnout | | 7,753 | 63.56 | ▲0.54 |
| Registered electors | | 12,198 | | |
| Majority | | 5,432 | 70.06 | ▲9.19 |
| BN hold | | Swing | | {{{2}}} |
Source(s) "KEPUTUSAN PILIHAN RAYA UMUM DEWAN UNDANGAN NEGERI SABAH BAGI TAHUN 2008".

Sabah state election, 2004: Senallang
| Party | Candidate | Votes | % | ∆% |
|---|---|---|---|---|
| BN | Nasir Sakaran | 5,361 | 70.65 | ▼21.74 |
| Independent | Maharani Ali Hani | 742 | 9.78 | ▲9.78 |
| Independent | Abdul Mim @ Abdul Aziz Taib | 452 | 5.96 | ▲5.96 |
| PKR | Mohd Abdul Wahab Abdullah | 381 | 5.02 | ▲5.02 |
| Independent | Joseph Yapp Yuk Tong | 264 | 3.48 | ▲3.48 |
| Total valid votes | | 7,200 | 94.89 | |
| Total rejected ballots | | 280 | 3.69 | |
| Unreturned ballots | | 108 | 1.42 | |
| Turnout | | 7,588 | 63.02 | ▼5.17 |
| Registered electors | | 12,041 | | |
| Majority | | 4,619 | 60.87 | ▲45.18 |
| BN hold | | Swing | | |
Source(s) "KEPUTUSAN PILIHAN RAYA UMUM DEWAN UNDANGAN NEGERI SABAH BAGI TAHUN 2004".

Sabah state election, 1999: Senallang
| Party | Candidate | Votes | % |
|---|---|---|---|
| BN | Nasir Sakaran | 4,855 | 48.91 |
| BERSEKUTU | Abdullah Sani Abdul Salleh | 3,297 | 33.22 |
| PBS | Sabardin Ombra | 1,637 | 16.49 |
| Total valid votes | | 9,789 | 98.62 |
| Total rejected ballots | | 137 | 1.38 |
| Unreturned ballots | | 0 | 0.00 |
| Turnout | | 9,926 | 68.19 |
| Registered electors | | 14,556 | |
| Majority | | 1,558 | 15.69 |
This was a new constituency created.
Source(s) "KEPUTUSAN PILIHAN RAYA UMUM DEWAN UNDANGAN NEGERI SABAH BAGI TAHUN 1999".
