= Joey Ryan Gundok =

Malaysian footballer

Personal information
- Full name: Joey Ryan Gundok
- Date of birth: 9 May 1983 (age 43)
- Place of birth: Tuaran, Sabah, Malaysia
- Height: 1.70 m (5 ft 7 in)
- Position: Midfielder

Youth career
- Sabah FA

Senior career*
Years	Team	Apps	(Gls)
2003–2005	Sabah		(3)
2006–2007	Perlis		(1)
2007–2008	DPMM	1	(0)
2008	Malacca		(0)
2009–2010	Sabah		
- * Club domestic league appearances and goals as of 4 May 2026

Joey Ryan Gundok (born 9 May 1983) is a Malaysian former footballer who played as a midfielder.

Gundok played for Sabah FA since 2003 but moved to Perlis FA in the 2006–07 season. He then had a brief spell with Brunei DPMM FC, before moving to Malacca FA of the Malaysia Premier League in 2008. He finally returned to his native Sabah from 2009 with his previous club, the state team.
