= Yang di-Pertua Negeri of Sabah =

Sabah Head of State

Governor of Sabah
- Yang di-Pertua Negeri Sabah
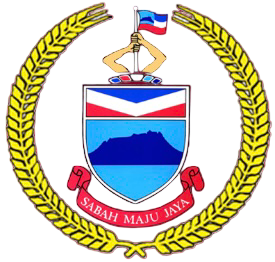

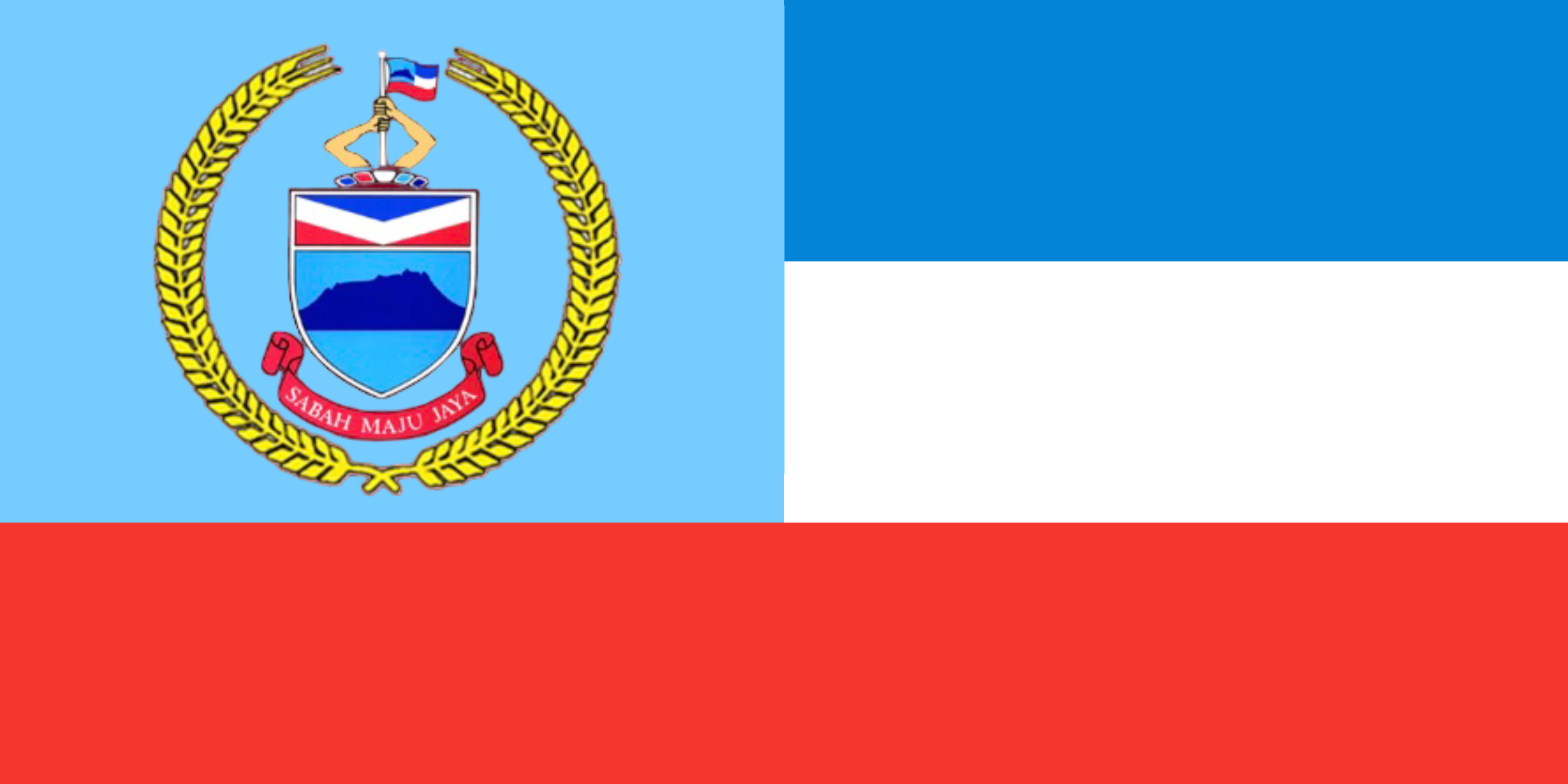

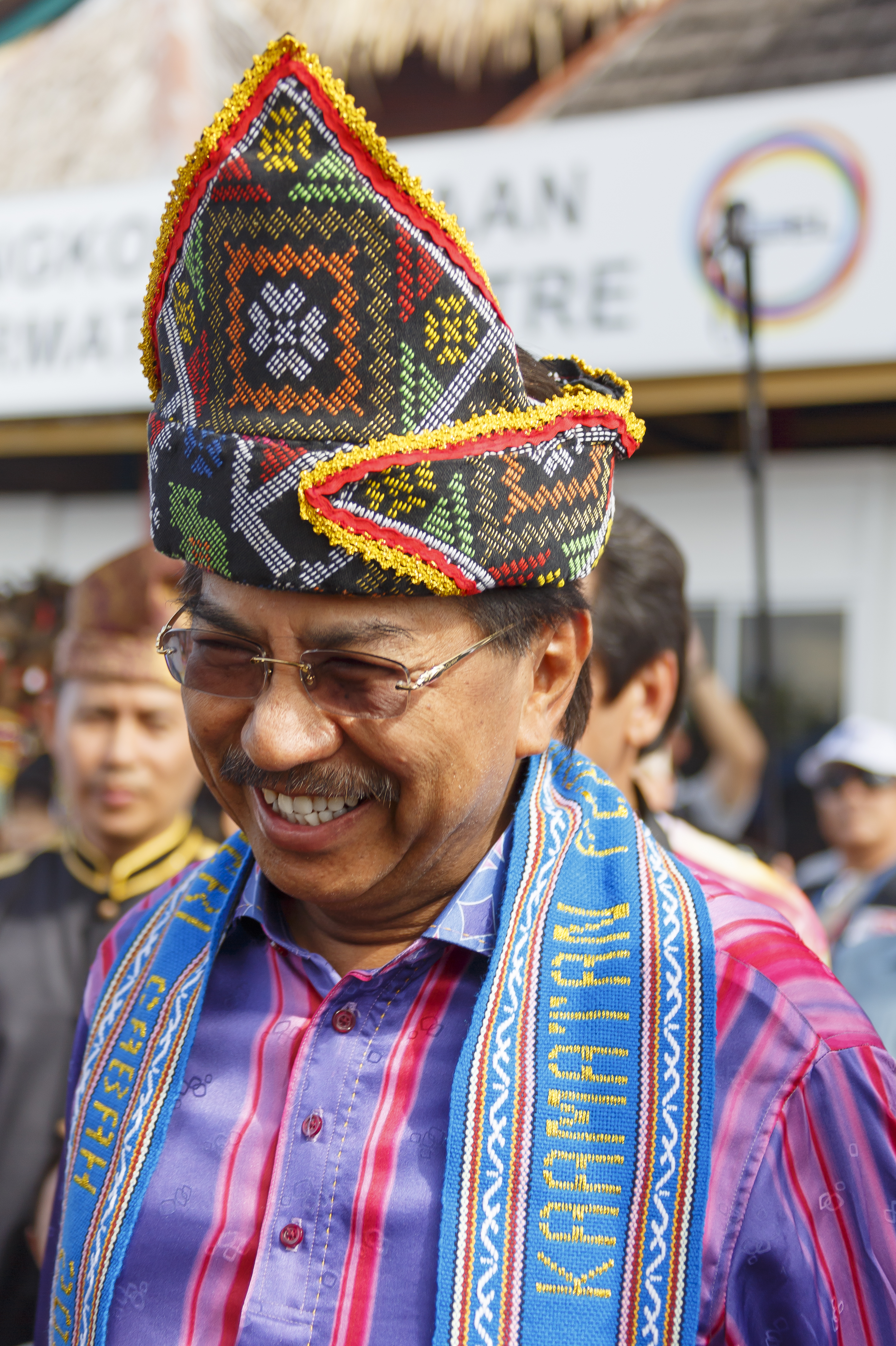
- Incumbent; Musa Aman since 1 January 2025
- Style: Tuan Yang Terutama (His Excellency)
- Status: Head of state
- Residence: Istana Seri Kinabalu, Kota Kinabalu
- Appointer: Yang di-Pertuan Agong
- Term length: Four years per term, unlimited number of terms and at the Yang di-Pertuan Agong's pleasure
- Inaugural holder: Datu Mustapha Datu Harun
- Formation: 16 September 1963
- Salary: RM 25,116.00 per month
- Website: istana.sabah.gov.my

The Governor of Sabah, officially Yang di-Pertua Negeri of Sabah (Malay: Yang di-Pertua Negeri Sabah), is the ceremonial head of state of Sabah, Malaysia. The Yang di-Pertua Negeri is styled Tuan Yang Terutama (TYT; "His Excellency"). The incumbent officeholder is Musa Aman, who took office on 1 January 2025.

== History ==
Following the formation of Malaysia on 16 September 1963, the Constitution of Sabah originally designated the head of state as Yang di-Pertua Negara. This title was incorrectly printed as Yang di-Pertuan Negara on 1964 Reprint of the Federal Constitution but was corrected to Yang di-Pertua Negara under Act 59/1966. Subsequently, on 27 August 1976, Act A354 amended the title to Yang di-Pertua Negeri, which remains in use to the present day.

== Appointment ==
The office of the Yang di-Pertua Negeri (governor) is established by the Constitution of the State of Sabah. According to Article 1(1) of the Constitution, the office must exist and be appointed by the Yang di-Pertuan Agong (King) after consultation with the Chief Minister. Every governor is appointed for a term of four years. However, the king reserves the power to extend his term of appointment.

His Excellency has neither a deputy nor an assistant. However, in event of his inability to govern the state due to illness, absence or any other cause, His Majesty reserves the power to appoint a person to exercise the function of the Governor.

== Functions, powers and privileges ==
Many functions and powers of the King – at the federal level – are delegated to the Governor at the state level – like the other rulers of states. The Governor, however, has no power and function towards the judiciary.

As he is the head of state, he is a member of the Conference of Rulers. He share the same power with the other members of the conference. However, he cannot be appointed as the Yang di-Pertuan Agong.

Article 10 of the State Constitution describes that the Governor has to act according to the State Constitution and makes decisions based on the advice from the State Cabinet. However, he may also act on his own discretion in certain matters.

The Constitution provides the power to the Governor to appoint key officers of the state, i.e. Speaker of the Legislative Assembly and his deputies; nominated members of the Assembly; ministers and assistant ministers of state; chairman, his deputy and members of the State Public Service Commission; the State Secretary; and the State Attorney General. All of them are appointed after consultation with the Chief Minister, except in appointing the Chief Minister. The same process occurred during dismissal of an officeholder.

The Constitution also describes powers of the Governor in the State Legislative Assembly. All bills must be assented by the Governor in 30 days after a bill passed. The Governor also has to address the assembly annually.

== List ==
=== Yang di-Pertua Negara of Sabah (1963–1976) ===
The following is the list of Yang di-Pertua Negara of Sabah:

No.	Coat of Arms	Portrait	Yang di-Pertua Negara (Birth–Death)	Term of office		
No.	Coat of Arms	Portrait	Yang di-Pertua Negara (Birth–Death)	Took office	Left office	Time in Office
1			Tun Datuk; Datu Mustapha Datu Harun (1918–1995)	16 September 1963	16 September 1965	2 years, 0 days
2			Tun Datuk; Pengiran Ahmad Raffae (1908–1995)	16 September 1965	16 September 1973	8 years, 0 days
3			Tun Datuk; Fuad Stephens (1920–1976)	16 September 1973	28 July 1975	1 year, 316 days
4			Tun Datuk; Mohd Hamdan Abdullah (1922–1977)	28 July 1975	27 August 1976	1 year, 31 days

=== Yang di-Pertua Negeri of Sabah (1976–present) ===
The following is the list of Yang di-Pertua Negeri of Sabah:

No.	Coat of Arms	Portrait	Yang di-Pertua Negeri (Birth–Death)	Term of office		
No.	Coat of Arms	Portrait	Yang di-Pertua Negeri (Birth–Death)	Took office	Left office	Time in Office
4			Tun Datuk; Mohd Hamdan Abdullah (1922–1977)	27 August 1976	10 October 1977	1 year, 45 days
5			Tun Datuk; Ahmad Koroh (1925–1978)	12 October 1977	25 June 1978	257 days
6			Tun Datuk; Mohamad Adnan Robert (1917–2003)	25 June 1978	31 December 1986	8 years, 190 days
7			Tun Datuk; Mohammad Said Keruak (1925–1995)	1 January 1987	31 December 1994	8 years, 0 days
8			Tun Datuk Seri Panglima; Sakaran Dandai (1930–2021)	1 January 1995	31 December 2002	8 years, 0 days
9			Tun Datuk Seri Panglima; Ahmadshah Abdullah (1946–2025)	1 January 2003	31 December 2010	8 years, 0 days
10			Tun Datuk Seri Panglima; Juhar Mahiruddin (b.1953)	1 January 2011	31 December 2024	14 years, 0 days
11			Tun Datuk Seri Panglima; Musa Aman (b.1951)	1 January 2025	Incumbent	1 year, 251 days

== Living former Yang di-Pertua Negeri ==
There is only one living former Yang di-Pertua Negeri of Sabah.

Name	Term as Yang di-Pertua Negeri	Date of birth
Juhar Mahiruddin	2011–2024	5 November 1953 (age 72)

== See also ==
- Governor of North Borneo (for the governors of the predecessing Colony of North Borneo)
- Yang di-Pertua Negeri
