= Mohammad Said Keruak =

Malaysian politician

Allahyarham Tun Mohammad Said Keruak SMN PMN
- محمد سعيد کرواق
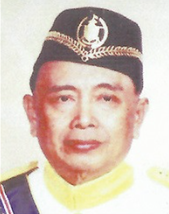

7th Yang di-Pertua Negeri of Sabah
- In office 1 January 1987 – 31 December 1994
- Preceded by: Mohamad Adnan Robert
- Succeeded by: Sakaran Dandai

4th Chief Minister of Sabah
- In office 1 November 1975 – 18 April 1976
- Preceded by: Mustapha Harun
- Succeeded by: Fuad Stephens

Personal details
- Born: Mohammad Said bin Keruak; 15 November 1925 Kota Belud, North Borneo
- Died: 17 November 1995 (aged 70) Kota Kinabalu, Sabah, Malaysia
- Spouse: Bandong Hasbollah
- Children: Five, including Salleh Said Keruak
- Parent(s): Keruak Beruk (deceased); Dampok Andarsi (deceased)

Mohammad Said bin Keruak (15 November 1925 – 17 November 1995) was a Malaysian politician who served as the 7th Yang di-Pertua Negeri of Sabah from January 1987 to December 1994 and 4th Chief Minister of Sabah briefly from November 1975 to April 1976. He was also father of another Malaysian politician, Salleh Said Keruak. Said Keruak's most consequential policy was the amendment to the state constitution which established Islam as the state religion of Sabah in 1973.

== Honours ==
=== Honours of Malaysia ===
- Malaysia
  - Commander of the Order of the Defender of the Realm (PMN) – Tan Sri (1971)
  - Grand Commander of the Order of the Defender of the Realm (SMN) – Tun (1989)

Political offices
Preceded by Mustapha Harun	Chief Minister of Sabah; 1975–1976	Succeeded by Fuad Stephens
Preceded by Mohamad Adnan Robert	Yang di-Pertua Negeri of Sabah; 1987–1994	Succeeded by Sakaran Dandai
