= Bingkor (state constituency) =

State constituency in Sabah, Malaysia

Bingkor (N40)
Sabah constituency

State constituency
- Legislature: Sabah State Legislative Assembly
MLA
Mohd Ishak Ayub
Homeland Solidarity Party
- Constituency created: 1974
- First contested: 1974
- Last contested: 2025

Demographics
- Population (2020): 38,299
- Electors (2025): 31,305

Bingkor is a state constituency in Sabah, Malaysia, that is represented in the Sabah State Legislative Assembly.

== Demographics ==
As of 2020, Bingkor has a population of 38,299 people.

Ethnic breakdown of Bingkor's electorate as of 2025
1. Non-Muslim Bumiputera (63.0%)
2. Muslim Bumiputera (29.0%)
3. Chinese (8.00%)
4. Other ethnicities (0.00%)

== History ==
=== Polling districts ===
According to the gazette issued on 31 October 2022, the Bingkor constituency has a total of 11 polling districts.

State constituency	Polling Districts	Code	Location
Bingkor (N40）	Ranggom Baru	180/40/01	SA Rakyat Al-Huda
Bingkor (N40）	Apin-Apin	180/40/02	SK Apin-Apin
Bingkor (N40）	Marampong	180/40/03	SK Merampong; SK Liau Apin-Apin
Bingkor (N40）	Bunga Raya	180/40/04	SK Bunga Raya
Bingkor (N40）	Kukuangoh	180/40/05	SK Kampong Baru
Bingkor (N40）	Tuntumulud	180/40/06	SK Bunsit
Bingkor (N40）	Bingkor	180/40/07	SK Bingkor
Bingkor (N40）	Baginda	180/40/08	SK Binaong
Bingkor (N40）	Tuarid Taud	180/40/09	SK Tuarid Taud
Bingkor (N40）	Keningau Station	180/40/10	SMK Keningau II
Bingkor (N40）	Keningau Bandar	180/40/11	SMK St. Francis Xavier

=== Representation history ===
Member of Sabah State Legislative Assembly for Bingkor
Assembly	No	Years	Member	Party
Constituency created from Keningau
5th	N37	1976	Ayub Aman	BERJAYA
5th	N37	1976–1981	Ayub Aman	BN (BERJAYA)
6th	N37	1981–1985	Ayub Aman	BN (BERJAYA)
7th	N25	1985–1986	Uling Anggan @ Thomas	PBS
8th	N25	1986–1990	Stephen R. Evans	PBS
9th	N25	1990–1994	Lawrence Gimbang	GR (PBS)
10th	N25	1994–1999	Jeffrey Kitingan	GR (PBS)
10th	N25	1994	Jeffrey Kitingan	BN (PBRS)
10th	N25	1994–1996	Jeffrey Kitingan	BN (AKAR)
10th	N25	1996–1999	Jeffrey Kitingan	PBS
11th	N28	1999–2002	Jeffrey Kitingan	PBS
11th	N28	2002–2004	Jeffrey Kitingan	BN (PBS)
12th	N33	2004–2008	Justin Guka	BN (UPKO)
13th	N33	2008–2013	Justin Guka	BN (UPKO)
14th	N33	2013–2018	Jeffrey Kitingan	STAR
15th	N33	2018–2020	Robert Tawik	STAR
15th	N33	2020	Robert Tawik	PN (STAR)
16th	N40	2020–2025	Robert Tawik	GRS (STAR)
16th	N40	2025	Robert Tawik	STAR
17th	N40	2025–present	Mohd Ishak Ayub	STAR

== Election results ==
Sabah state election, 2025
Party	Candidate	Votes	%	∆%
Homeland Solidarity Party	Mohd Ishak Ayub	9,346	47.07	▲47.07
GRS	Rafie Robert	3,919	19.74	▲19.74
UPKO	Kennedy John	2,728	13.74	▲13.74
Heritage	Benedict Martin Gunir	2,451	12.34	▼11.24
KDM	Niklos Ongoh	803	4.04	▲4.04
Independent	Ahamin Salim	312	1.57	▲1.57
Sabah Dream Party	Kenolee Justine	84	0.42	▲0.42
Sabah Nationality Party	Thomas Anggan	83	0.42	▲0.42
Pertubuhan Parti Gemilang Anak Sabah	Haryady Antutu	71	0.36	▲0.36
Sabah Peace Party	Solzah Sual	60	0.30	▲0.30
Total valid votes		19,857		
Total rejected ballots		176		
Unreturned ballots		40		
Turnout		20,073	64.12	▼3.00
Registered electors		31,305		
Majority		5,427	27.33	▼15.04
Homeland Solidarity Party gain from PN		Swing		?
Source(s) "RESULTS OF CONTESTED ELECTION AND STATEMENTS OF THE POLL AFTER THE OFFICIAL ADDITION OF VOTES" (PDF).

Sabah state election, 2020
Party	Candidate	Votes	%	∆%
PN	Robert Tawik	7,891	65.95	▲33.40
Sabah Heritage Party	Peter Saili	2,821	23.58	▲23.58
Love Sabah Party	Alphonsus Felix	447	3.74	▲3.74
PBS	Peter Jino Allion	298	2.49	▲2.49
LDP	Julius Favianus	210	1.75	▲1.75
USNO (Baru)	Engah Sintan	104	0.87	▲0.87
Total valid votes		11,771	98.37	
Total rejected ballots		128	1.07	
Unreturned ballots		67	0.56	
Turnout		11,966	67.12	▼11.61
Registered electors		17,828		
Majority		5,070	42.37	▲41.19
PN gain from STAR		Swing		?
Source(s) "RESULTS OF CONTESTED ELECTION AND STATEMENTS OF THE POLL AFTER THE OFFICIAL ADDITION OF VOTES".

Sabah state election, 2018
Party	Candidate	Votes	%	∆%
STAR	Robert Tawik	4,552	32.55	▼8.85
BN	Peter Jino Allion	4,387	31.37	▼6.50
DAP	Peter Saili	4,233	30.27	▲11.95
Sabah Native Co-operation Party	Aisat Ellik Igau @ Oswald Iggau	290	2.07	▲2.07
Independent	Justin Guka	182	1.30	▲1.30
Sabah Nationality Party	Thomas Anggan	69	0.49	▲0.49
Total valid votes		13,713	98.06	
Total rejected ballots		190	1.36	
Unreturned ballots		81	0.58	
Turnout		13,984	78.73	▼2.66
Registered electors		17,761		
Majority		862	1.18	▼2.35
STAR hold		Swing		
Source(s) "RESULTS OF CONTESTED ELECTION AND STATEMENTS OF THE POLL AFTER THE OFFICIAL ADDITION OF VOTES".

Sabah state election, 2013
Party	Candidate	Votes	%	∆%
STAR	Jeffrey Kitingan	5,350	41.40	▲41.40
BN	Kennedy Jie John @ Kenn	4,894	37.87	▼10.67
PKR	Ahmad Shah Hussein Tambakau	2,368	18.32	▼30.22
Independent	Ricky @ Roland Sedomon	111	0.86	▲0.86
Total valid votes		12,723	98.45	
Total rejected ballots		185	1.43	
Unreturned ballots		15	0.12	
Turnout		12,923	81.39	▲10.51
Registered electors		15,878		
Majority		456	3.53	▲1.72
STAR gain from BN		Swing		?
Source(s) "KEPUTUSAN PILIHAN RAYA UMUM DEWAN UNDANGAN NEGERI". Archived from the original on 2022-10-10.

Sabah state election, 2008
Party	Candidate	Votes	%	∆%
BN	Justin Guka	4,589	48.54	▼12.61
PKR	Jeffrey Kitingan	4,418	46.73	▲46.73
Independent	Uling @ Thomas Anggan	164	1.73	▲1.73
Independent	Victor Leornadus @ Leonardus	129	1.36	▲1.36
Total valid votes		9,300	98.36	
Total rejected ballots		155	1.64	
Unreturned ballots		0	0.00	
Turnout		9,455	70.88	▲6.24
Registered electors		13,339		
Majority		171	1.81	▼41.62
BN hold		Swing		{{{2}}}
Source(s) "KEPUTUSAN PILIHAN RAYA UMUM DEWAN UNDANGAN NEGERI SABAH BAGI TAHUN 2008".

Sabah state election, 2004
Party	Candidate	Votes	%	∆%
BN	Justin Guka	5,353	61.15	▲0.48
Independent	Ribus Tingadon	1,551	17.72	▲17.72
Independent	Jino Allion @ Peter Alliun	1,283	14.66	▲14.66
SETIA	Suaidin Langkab @ Shuhaiddin Langab	314	3.59	▲3.59
PASOK	Anchis Udog @ Rayner Francis Udong	147	1.68	▲1.68
Total valid votes		8,648	98.79	
Total rejected ballots		83	0.95	
Unreturned ballots		23	0.26	
Turnout		8,754	64.64	▼7.66
Registered electors		13,543		
Majority		3,802	43.43	▲18.20
BN gain from PBS		Swing		?
Source(s) "KEPUTUSAN PILIHAN RAYA UMUM DEWAN UNDANGAN NEGERI SABAH BAGI TAHUN 2004".

Sabah state election, 1999
Party	Candidate	Votes	%	∆%
PBS	Jeffrey Kitingan	8,339	60.67	▼7.39
BN	Joseph Kurup	4,871	35.44	▲11.55
BERSEKUTU	Kuilan Anggau @ Justina	395	2.87	▲2.87
Independent	Peter Kodou	22	0.16	▲0.16
Total valid votes		13,627	99.15	
Total rejected ballots		117	0.85	
Unreturned ballots		0	0.00	
Turnout		13,744	72.30	▼5.76
Registered electors		19,009		
Majority		3,468	25.23	▼18.94
PBS hold		Swing		
Source(s) "KEPUTUSAN PILIHAN RAYA UMUM DEWAN UNDANGAN NEGERI SABAH BAGI TAHUN 1999".

Sabah state election, 1994
Party	Candidate	Votes	%	∆%
PBS	Jeffrey Kitingan	6,408	68.06	▲9.93
BN	Injon Sedomon @ John Reynold	2,249	23.89	▼3.86
Independent	Ayub Aman	688	7.31	▲7.31
Total valid votes		9,345	99.26	
Total rejected ballots		70	0.74	
Unreturned ballots		0	0.00	
Turnout		9,415	78.06	▼3.57
Registered electors		12,061		
Majority		4,159	44.17	▲13.79
PBS hold		Swing		
Source(s) "KEPUTUSAN PILIHAN RAYA UMUM DEWAN UNDANGAN NEGERI SABAH BAGI TAHUN 1994".

Sabah state election, 1990
Party	Candidate	Votes	%	∆%
PBS	Lawrence Gimbang	5,223	58.13	▼8.65
USNO	Sairin Karno	2,493	27.75	▲27.75
PRS	Ayub Aman	950	10.57	▲10.57
AKAR	John Injon Sedomon	117	1.30	▲1.30
BERJAYA	Airin Sedomon @ Irene	71	0.79	▼11.89
Independent	Paul Kadau	55	0.61	▲0.61
Total valid votes		8,909	99.15	
Total rejected ballots		76	0.85	
Unreturned ballots		0	0.00	
Turnout		8,985	81.63	▲1.63
Registered electors		11,007		
Majority		2,730	30.38	▼18.90
PBS hold		Swing		
Source(s) "KEPUTUSAN PILIHAN RAYA UMUM DEWAN UNDANGAN NEGERI SABAH BAGI TAHUN 1990".

Sabah state election, 1986
Party	Candidate	Votes	%	∆%
PBS	Stephen R. Evans	4,713	66.78	▲8.41
PASOK	Uling Anggan @ Thomas	1,235	17.50	▲17.50
BERJAYA	Mohd Amir Arif	895	12.68	▼6.36
Independent	Jumining Kinjawan @ Dennis Jumining Kinj	137	1.94	▲1.94
Total valid votes		6,980	98.91	
Total rejected ballots		77	1.09	
Unreturned ballots		0	0.00	
Turnout		7,057	80.00	▲0.14
Registered electors		8,821		
Majority		3,478	49.28	▲12.56
PBS hold		Swing		
Source(s) "KEPUTUSAN PILIHAN RAYA UMUM DEWAN UNDANGAN NEGERI SABAH BAGI TAHUN 1986".

Sabah state election, 1985
Party	Candidate	Votes	%	∆%
PBS	Uling Anggan	3,572	58.37	▲58.37
USNO	Sapin Karano	1,325	21.65	▼0.10
BERJAYA	Ayub Aman	1,165	19.04	▼46.00
BERSEPADU	Vincent Marukau Anjak	58	0.95	▲0.95
Total valid votes		6,120		
Total rejected ballots		117		
Unreturned ballots		0	0.00	
Turnout		6,120	79.86	▲0.36
Registered electors		7,663		
Majority		2,247	36.72	▼6.57
PBS gain from BERJAYA		Swing		?
Source(s) "How they fared". New Straits Times. 1985-04-22.

Sabah state election, 1981
Party	Candidate	Votes	%	∆%
BERJAYA	Ayub Aman	3,347	65.04	▲3.22
USNO	Sapin Karano	1,119	21.75	▼14.84
PASOK	Uling Anggang	680	13.21	▲13.21
Total valid votes		5,146	97.89	
Total rejected ballots		111	2.11	
Unreturned ballots		0	0.00	
Turnout		5,257	79.50	▼5.24
Registered electors		6,612		
Majority		2,228	43.29	▲18.06
BERJAYA hold		Swing		
Source(s) "Sabah election: How they fared". New Straits Times. 1981-03-29.

Sabah state election, 1976
Party	Candidate	Votes	%
BERJAYA	Ayub Aman	2,450	61.82
USNO	Justine R. Sedomon	1,450	36.59
Independent	Juri Gahun	63	1.59
Total valid votes		3,963	100.00
Total rejected ballots		108	
Unreturned ballots		0	
Turnout		4,071	84.74
Registered electors		4,804	
Majority		1,000	25.23
This was a new constituency created
