= WBKG =

WBKG may refer to:

- WBKG (FM), a radio station (88.9 FM) licensed to Macon, Georgia, United States
- Keningau Airport, in Keningau, Sabah, Malaysia (ICAO code WBKG)
