= Kina =

Kina may refer to:

- Kina, Republic of Dagestan, village in Dagestan
- Kina (animal), a sea urchin endemic to New Zealand
- Kina (musician), American singer/songwriter, and former member of musical group Brownstone
- Kina, an Italian music producer known for the single "Get You the Moon"
- Kina (name), other people named "Kina"
- Papua New Guinean kina, the currency of Papua New Guinea
- Kina, the name of China in the Albanian, Greek, Danish, Norwegian, Macedonian, Serbo-Croatian, Icelandic, and Swedish languages
- Kina, a character in The Black Company
- Kina, a brand of candy from Fazer
- KINA, a radio station in Salina, Kansas

== See also ==
- Photokina, a trade fair for the photographic and imaging industries in Cologne
