= Stephen R. Evans =

Malaysian politician

Datuk Seri Panglima Stephen Robert Evans (1935–2017) SPDK, JP was a politician, public administrator and author from Sabah, Malaysia.

Evans was born in Kampong Bariawa Laut, a small village populated by ethnic Dusun people predominantly of the Bundu-Liwan tribe in Keningau District, North Borneo (now Sabah) and was a Eurasian of mixed Dusun (of the Kwijau tribe from another part of Keningau district known as Bingkor hailing from the village of Kampung Bandukan Lama) and British descent. His father was Richard F. Evans, a colonial District Officer and later Resident of the West Coast Division for the North Borneo Chartered Company administration, which ruled North Borneo until the 1942 Japanese invasion in World War II who intermarried a local native woman from the said village.

== Education ==
Evans studied in a Japanese primary school in Keningau during the occupation. After the war ended, he furthered his secondary education in several Catholic mission schools at Sandakan, Kuching, Sarawak as well as in Jesselton (now Kota Kinabalu). He attended universities in Britain, United States and Australia, gaining B.Sc. and MA degrees in Public Administration and Diplomas in Journalism and Agriculture. In 1966, he was awarded a Columbo Plan Scholarship from the New Zealand Government to study Public Administration and Local Government.

== Political career ==
Evans had a distinguished career as a politician in Sabah. He served as a Member of Parliament from 8 August 1974 to 1 June 1977, and a Senator from 15 December 1977 to 20 June 1978. He was re-elected as an MP from 15 July 1978 until 29 March 1982. In 1986, he was elected as a member of the Legislative Assembly, serving from 5 May 1986 until 26 June 1990. Evans was awarded a PGDK, Commander of the Order of Kinabalu (second class Datukship: Datuk) by the State Government in 1977 and in 1989 he was conferred the State's highest award, SPDK, Grand Commander of the Order of Kinabalu (first class Datukship: Datuk Seri Panglima).

Evans also served as a Justice of the Peace, and was a life member of the Commonwealth Parliamentary Association and the Malaysian Parliamentary Association. He authored several books, and twice won the Borneo Literature Bureau's Literature Competition. He was a polyglot politician, being fluent in English (his first language), Malay (especially his native Sabahan dialect) as well as his adoptive cum maternal ethnic native Dusunic languages (both the Bundu-Liwan standard language as well as his matrilineal indigenous Kwijau dialect) and also his district's main native indigenous language of Murut.

== Death ==
Evans died on 27 September 2017 at the age of 82. Musa Aman, Sabah's then-chief minister, called on the family residence to pay his last respects.

== Bibliography ==
- Guide for Sabah Native Courts (1967) Kuching: Borneo Literature Bureau
- Further Folktales from Sabah (1977) Kuching: Borneo Literature Bureau
- English for students preparing for the Malaysia Certificate of Education the Cambridge School Certificate and General Certificate of Education Examinations (1988) Keningau, Sabah: Stephen R. Evans
- Sabah (North Borneo) Under the Rising Sun Government (1990, reprinted 1999) Singapore: Stephen R. Evans ('The Author's Profile' in this book has provided much of the material for this article; large parts of Evans' book are copied word-for-word from Kinabalu Guerillas by Maxwell Hall (1949))
- The History of Labuan Island (Victoria Island) (1996) Stephen R. Evans, Abdul Rahman Zainal and Rod Wong Khet Ngee. Singapore: Calendar Print
