= Kinna (name) =

Kinna is a surname and given name. Notable people with the name include:

== Surname ==
- Chris Kinna, Australian rugby player
- Patrick Kinna (1913–2009), Winston Churchill's stenographer during World War II
- Ruth Kinna (born 1961), British philosopher

== Given name ==
- Kinna Gieth (Anna Katarina Gieth; born 1976), Swedish writer
- Kinna McInroe (born 1973), American actress

== See also ==
- Kina (name)
