= Kwijau =

Kwijau people Kuijau / Kwijau
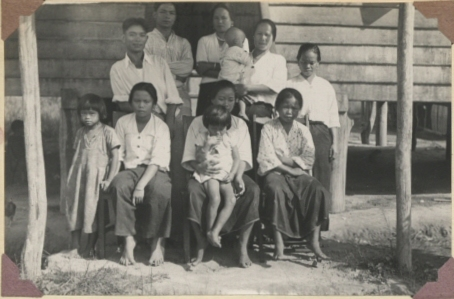
- A Kwijau family party in Keningau, Sabah, Malaysia during the colonial era.

Total population
- 23,000

Regions with significant populations
- Borneo
- Malaysia: 12,000
- Indonesia: 11,000

Languages
- Kwijau, Malaysian in the form of Sabah Malay (those who reside in Sabah) and also Indonesian (those who are living in Kalimantan)

Religion
- Animism, Christianity (predominantly), Islam

Related ethnic groups
- Dusunic related peoples; (Kadazan; Dusun; Paitan; Tatana, Lotud; Brunei Dusun; Rungus; Kadazan-Dusun); Dayak • Iban • Melanau • Lun Bawang/Dayeh • Murut • Kedayan • other Austronesian peoples

The Kwijau or Kuijau are an indigenous ethnic group residing in Sabah, eastern Malaysia on the island of Borneo. The Kwijau tribe claim descent from the Nunuk Ragang settlers who intermarried and assimilated with the native Muruts. They reside in the Keningau district of the Interior Division within a 12-mile radius to the west and north of Keningau town centre (located in the township or sub-district of Bingkor). Their population was estimated at 7,910 in the year 2000. They are considered a sub-group of the Kadazan-Dusun, as their language is on the Dusunic branch of the Austronesian language family (ISO 639-3 dkr). About 20% of the population embrace the Christian faith in denominations of evangelical Christianity and Roman Catholicism with large significant Muslim minorities, the remainder are animist practicing the ancient belief system called Momolianism. They are known for performing the Magunatip, an east Malaysian dance very strongly influenced by the Philippine tinikling. Performed by the young men and women, the dance involves jumping steps that manoeuvre the dancer's feet in and out, so as not to get their feet trapped by 2 moving bamboo poles that are held by another pair of dancers, who beat the poles together and over a shorter length of wood or bamboo, creating an interesting rhythm.
