= Robert Tawik =

Malaysian politician

Yang Berbahagia Datuk Robert Tawik @ Nordin PGDK
- روبرت تاويك @ نوردين

State Assistant Minister of Works of Sabah
- In office 8 October 2020 – 29 November 2025 Serving with Limus Jury
- Minister: Bung Moktar Radin (2020–2023); Shahelmey Yahya (2023–2025)
- Governor: Juhar Mahiruddin
- Chief Minister: Hajiji Noor
- Preceded by: Muis Picho (State Assistant Minister of Infrastructure Development of Sabah)
- Succeeded by: Ruddy Awah
- Constituency: Bingkor

Member of the Sabah State Legislative Assembly for Bingkor
- In office 9 May 2018 – 29 November 2025
- Preceded by: Jeffrey Kitingan (STAR)
- Succeeded by: Mohd Ishak Ayub (STAR)
- Majority: 165 (2018); 5,070 (2020)

Deputy President of the Homeland Solidarity Party (Muslim Bumiputera)
- In office 22 October 2021 – 7 October 2025 Serving with Ellron Alfred Angin (Non-Muslim Bumiputera); Fung Len Fui (Chinese) (2021–2024); Kenny Chua Teck Ho (Chinese) (since 2024)
- President: Jeffrey Kitingan
- Preceded by: Jalumin Bayogoh

Faction represented in the Sabah State Legislative Assembly
- 2018–2020: Homeland Solidarity Party
- 2020–2022: Perikatan Nasional
- 2020–2025: Gabungan Rakyat Sabah

Personal details
- Born: Mohd. Nordin Robert bin Mohd. Hasnan Tawik; 1 September 1963 (age 62) Bingkor, Keningau, Crown Colony of North Borneo
- Citizenship: Malaysian
- Party: Homeland Solidarity Party (STAR)
- Other political affiliations: Perikatan Nasional (PN) (2020–2022); Gabungan Rakyat Sabah (GRS) (since 2020)
- Occupation: Politician

Robert Tawik @ Nordin (born 1 September 1963) is a Malaysian politician who has served as the State Assistant Minister of Works of Sabah in the Gabungan Rakyat Sabah (GRS) state administration under Chief Minister Hajiji Noor and Ministers Bung Moktar Radin and Shahelmey Yahya from October 2020 until November 2025 and Member of the Sabah State Legislative Assembly (MLA) for Bingkor from May 2018 until December 2025. He is a member of the Homeland Solidarity Party (STAR), a component party of the GRS coalition.

== Election results ==
Sabah State Legislative Assembly
Year	Constituency	Candidate	Votes	Pct	Opponent(s)	Votes	Pct	Ballots cast	Majority	Turnout
2018	N33 Bingkor	Robert Tawik (STAR)	4,552	33.19%	Peter Jino Allion (PBS)	4,387	32.00%	13,984	165	78.70%
2018	N33 Bingkor	Robert Tawik (STAR)	4,552	33.19%	Peter Saili (DAP)	4,233	30.87%	13,984	165	78.70%
2018	N33 Bingkor	Robert Tawik (STAR)	4,552	33.19%	Aisat Igau (PKAN)	290	2.11%	13,984	165	78.70%
2018	N33 Bingkor	Robert Tawik (STAR)	4,552	33.19%	Justin Guka (IND)	182	1.33%	13,984	165	78.70%
2018	N33 Bingkor	Robert Tawik (STAR)	4,552	33.19%	Uling Thomas Anggan (PKS)	69	0.50%	13,984	165	78.70%
2020	N40 Bingkor	Robert Tawik (STAR)	7,891	67.04%	Peter Saili (DAP)	2,821	23.97%	11,771	5,070	66.03%
2020	N40 Bingkor	Robert Tawik (STAR)	7,891	67.04%	Alphonsus Felix (PCS)	447	3.80%	11,771	5,070	66.03%
2020	N40 Bingkor	Robert Tawik (STAR)	7,891	67.04%	Peter Jino Allion (PBS)	298	2.53%	11,771	5,070	66.03%
2020	N40 Bingkor	Robert Tawik (STAR)	7,891	67.04%	Julius Favianus (LDP)	210	1.78%	11,771	5,070	66.03%
2020	N40 Bingkor	Robert Tawik (STAR)	7,891	67.04%	Engah Sintan (USNO Baru)	104	0.88%	11,771	5,070	66.03%

== Honours ==
- Sabah
  - Commander of the Order of Kinabalu (PGDK) – Datuk (2020)
