= Keningau Oath Stone =

- Batu Sumpah Keningau
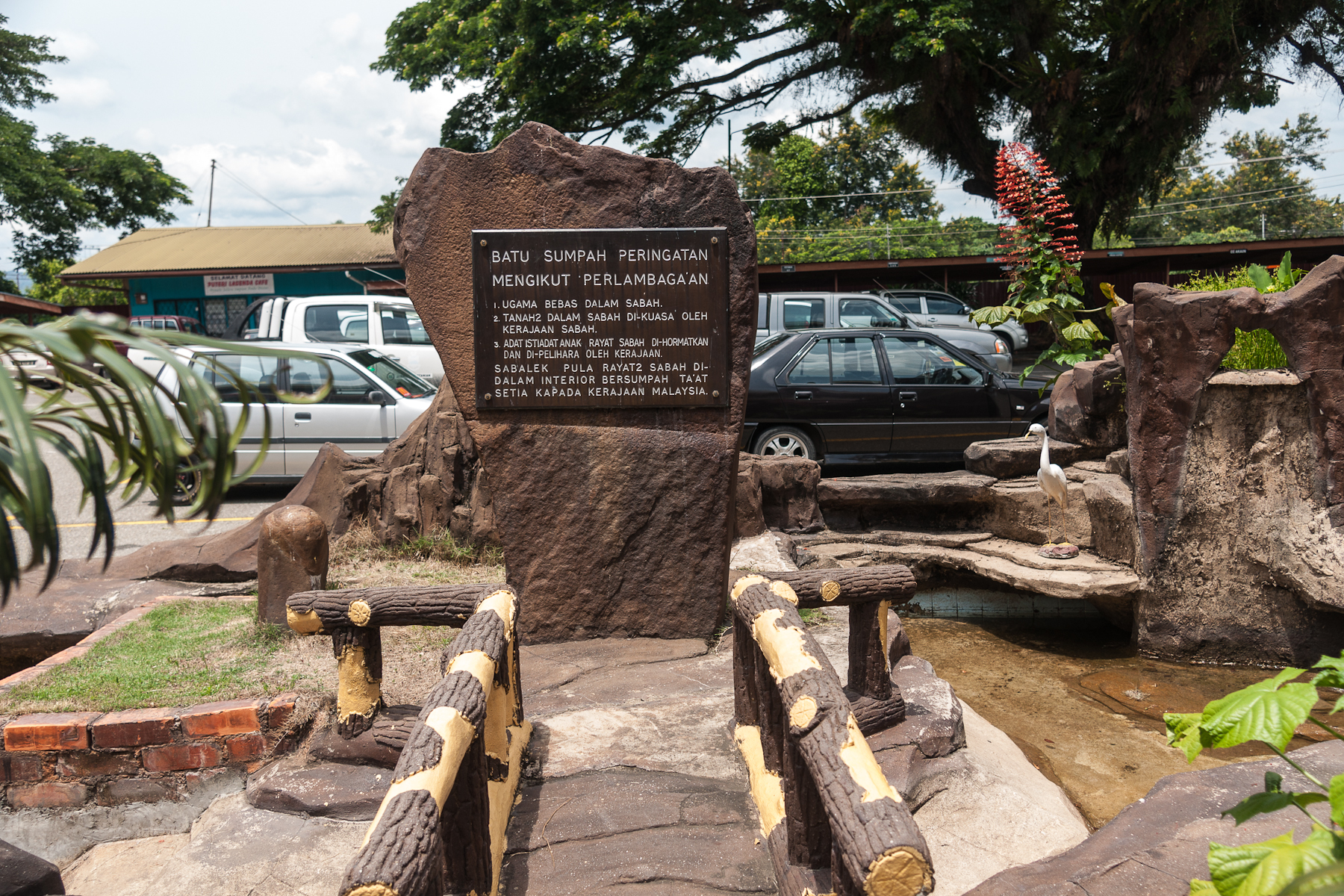
- Interactive map of Keningau Oath Stone
- Location: Keningau, Sabah
- Coordinates: 5°20′34.49″N 116°9′41.89″E
- Designer: Garukon Gurun
- Type: Megalithic
- Material: Stone
- Dedicated to: Agreement between Interior Sabahan and Malaysian Government

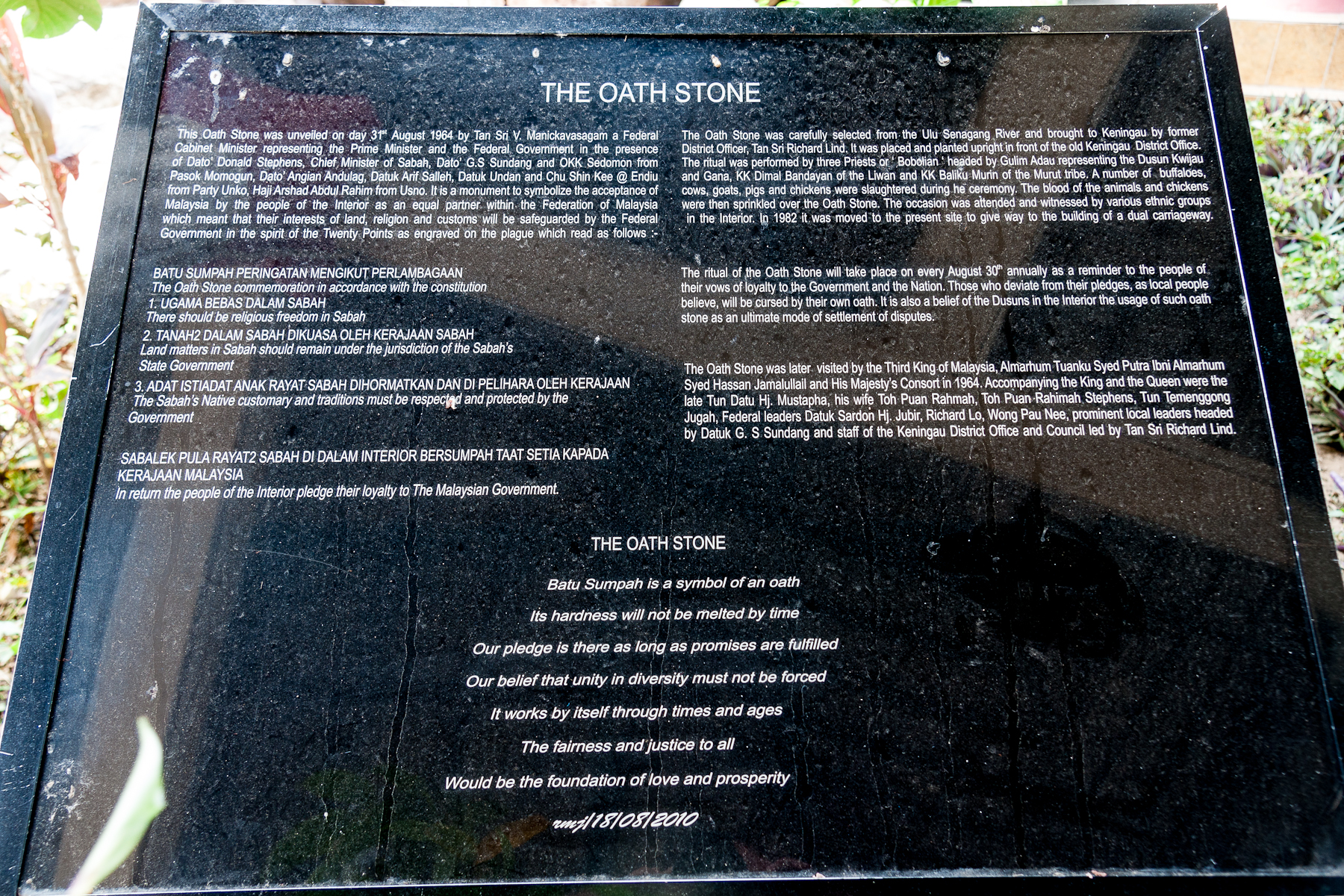
Information about Batu Sumpah Keningau at the District Office

The Keningau Oath Stone (Malay: Batu Sumpah Keningau) is a monument in Keningau, Sabah which was specially erected to commemorate the merger of the British Crown Colony of North Borneo with the former colony of Sarawak and states of the Federation of Malaya to form Malaysia.

== History ==
=== Reservations to the formation of Malaysia ===
The proposal to form a larger federation of Malaysia comprising the recently independent nation of the Federation of Malaya, the British protectorate of Brunei, and the crown colonies of North Borneo, Sarawak and Singapore had met with some initial opposition from influential community leaders in the respective territories.

The North Borneo Legislative Council finally agreed to accede to the Malaysia Agreement on 12 September 1962 after presenting the 20-point agreement written by Donald Stephens during the negotiations to form Malaysia. Despite this development, considerable apprehension and reservations still existed among the traditional native chiefs of Sabah known as the Orang Kaya-Kaya regarding the rights of the state within the new federation.

=== Guarantees set in stone ===
One of the original stone retriever also request for correction on the stone origin as the stone is retrieved from the Senagang River, not Pegalan River as stated in current source.

After a series of discussion and consultation, a proposal was made by the State Legislative Opposition Leader cum traditional native chief, Samson Sundang Gunsanad and his brother OKK Sedomon of the United Pasok-Momogun Kadazan Organisation (later re-organised as the United Pasok Nunukragang National Organisation) to erect an oath stone summarising the guarantees given by the Malaysian government to Sabah while reiterating the loyalty of the people of the Interior to Malaysia. However, according to Zainnal Ajamain, a Sabah historian, G.S. Sundang did not endorse on the "minimum safeguards" for Sabah before entering the federation, while advocating complete "state rights" like other states in Malaysia such as Penang and Malacca. Sundang carved stone out of frustration.

There are many stones taken and collected from surrounding areas of Keningau such as Bandukan, Bayayo, Dangulad, Senagang, Tuarid, and Ulu Liawan but they are not suitable and are easily broken. The District Officer of Keningau, Richard Lind (later to become the State Secretary of Sabah), was charged to oversee the erection of the oath stone. A suitable boulder was taken from the Pegalan River near Kampung Dangulad (a small village in Keningau) and carved by Garukon Gurun, former Sergeant Major of the legendary North Borneo Constabulary. A plaque was commissioned and made by the Thornycroft Shipyard in Singapore to be affixed to the stone.

=== Oath stone unveiled ===
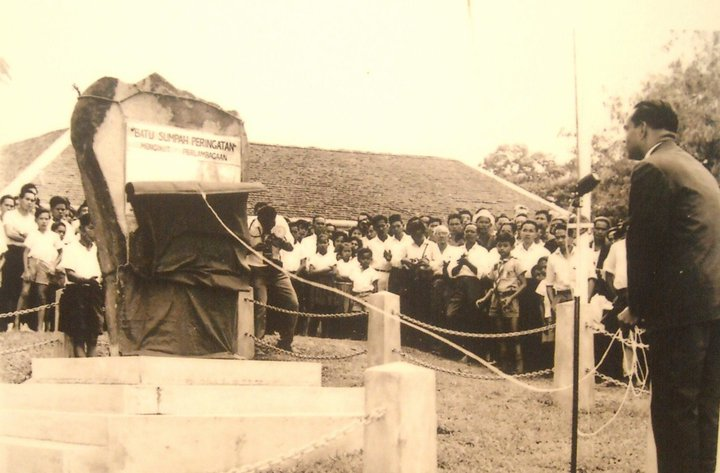
Donald Stephens officiating the oath stone on 31 August 1964, an important agreement remembrance that has been promised between Sabahans and the Malaysian federal government.

The Keningau Oath Stone was unveiled and officiated on 31 August 1964 at the compound of the old Keningau District Office. The event was officiated by the Federal Minister of Labour, V. Manickavasagam, and witnessed by state government officials and community leaders including the Chief Minister, Donald Stephens, the leader of the United Pasokmomogun Organisation, G. S. Sundang as well as the OCPD of Keningau, Ajamain Duraman and other traditional native chiefs.

A maningolig ritual with an animal sacrifice by a bobolian (traditional priest) was held in accordance with the traditional beliefs of the Dusun people to bind the guarantees.

=== Malaysia Day 2010 ===
In commemoration of Malaysia Day in 2010, Parti Keadilan Rakyat led by state party leader, Jeffrey Kitingan, re-enacted the maningolig ritual at the monument. The sacrificed rooster was later found to be alive despite having its neck slit. Kitingan noted that this was possibly a "symbolic reminder that not all the terms of the Malaysia Agreement had been honoured".

=== Oath stone relocation and plaque restoration ===
During Malaysia Day celebration on 16 September 2014, the inscription of the stone was found to have been tampered with. The words "Kerajaan Malaysia Jamin" (The Government of Malaysia guarantees) were removed from below the title "Batu Sumpah Peringatan Mengikut Parlambaga'an" (Memorial Oath Stone according to the Constitution).

On 6 July 2015, the original plaque of the inscription was reportedly found by a resident in Kampung Apin-Apin. The plaque was later handed over to Sabah state assemblyman Jeffrey Kitingan. Meanwhile, Jeffrey has decided to hand over the plaque to Sabah chief minister Musa Aman in the next Sabah State Legislative Assembly sitting. However, Sabah Museum Director, Joanna Kitingan, who is Jeffrey's sister, expressed doubt about the originality of the newly discovered plaque.

On 30 January 2015, it was proposed that the oath stone would be relocated to the compound of Keningau Land and Survey Department with the missing words reinstated. In February 2016, the oath stone was proposed to be moved to Keningau Heritage Museum and will be gazetted as National Heritage Site.

The continuous delaying for relocation as well with the high cost reason for restoration from the federal government have been criticised by Sabahan politicians and perceived by them as the federal government not having an intention to keep its promise. However, despite the persistent delays, Minister in the Prime Minister's Department, Joseph Kurup, pledged that the stone would be restored and relocated with the missing words of 'Kerajaan Malaysia Jamin'. Around RM1.025 million have been allocated by the federal government for the relocation to a site near the Keningau Heritage Museum. Malaysian Tourism and Culture Minister Mohamed Nazri Abdul Aziz said the relocation would enable more people and tourists to come and appreciate the history behind the Oath Stone and it would be gazetted under the State Cultural Heritage Enactment (Preservation 1997) after the relocation.

In September 2018, the oath stone was relocated to Keningau Heritage museum with the three missing words restored.

== Plaque inscription ==
The inscription on the plaque affixed to the Keningau Oath Stone is in the Malay language written in the old spelling system (pre-1972 Spelling Reform):

Batu Sumpah Peringatan Mengikut Parlambaga'an

1. Ugama Bebas Dalam Sabah
2. Tanah2 Dalam Sabah Di-Kuasa Oleh Kerajaan Sabah
3. Adat Istiadat Anak Rayat Sabah Di-hormatkan dan Di-pelihara Oleh Kerajaan

Sebalek Pula Rayat2 Sabah di Interior Bersumpah Ta'at Setia Kapada Kerajaan Malaysia

Translated, it reads:

Memorial Oath Stone according to the Constitution

1. Freedom of Religion in Sabah
2. The Government of Sabah Holds Authority over Land in Sabah
3. Native Customs and Traditions Will Be Respected and Upheld by the Government

In Return, the People of Sabah's Interior Pledges Loyalty to the Government of Malaysia

== See also ==
- History of Malaysia
- History of Sabah
- Malaysia Day
- 20-point agreement (Sabah)
- Datuk Seri Panglima O.K.K Gunsanad Kina
