= Richard Lind =

Malaysian civil servant (died 2021)

Sabah State Secretary
- In office 1968–1976
- Nominated by: Pengiran Ahmad Raffae
- Appointed by: Mustapha Harun
- Governor: Pengiran Ahmad Raffae; Fuad Stephens; Mohd Hamdan Abdullah
- Preceded by: John Benedict Dusing
- Succeeded by: Abdul Hamid Egoh
- Chief Minister: Mustapha Harun; Mohammad Said Keruak

Chairman, Sabah Civil Service Commission
- In office 1976–1978
- Nominated by: Mohd Hamdan Abdullah
- Appointed by: Mohammad Said Keruak
- Governor: Mohd Hamdan Abdullah; Ahmad Koroh
- Chief Minister: Mohammad Said Keruak; Fuad Stephens; Harris Salleh

District Officer, Tenom
- In office 1965–1968
- Governor: Mustapha Harun; Pengiran Ahmad Raffae
- Chief Minister: Fuad Stephens; Peter Lo; Mustapha Harun

District Officer, Keningau
- In office 1963–1965
- Governor: Mustapha Harun
- Chief Minister: Fuad Stephens; Peter Lo

Personal details
- Born: Richard Allan Lind; August 22, 1923 Tenom, North Borneo, British Empire
- Died: March 20, 2021 (aged 97) Signal Hill, Likas, Kota Kinabalu, Sabah
- Citizenship: Malaysian
- Spouse: Betty Lind
- Profession: Civil servant

Tan Sri Richard Allan Lind (22 August 1923 – 20 March 2021) was a civil servant who served as Sabah State Secretary from 1968 to 1976 and one of the prominent figures responsible for the erection of the Keningau Oath Stone, a monument in Sabah, Malaysia.

== Books ==
- My Sabah: Reminiscences of a Former State Secretary, (2003) ISBN 9789838120760
