= Kina (name) =

Kina is a given name and surname. Notable people with the name include:

== Given name ==
- Kina (musician) (born Kina Cosper in 1969), American musician and former member of Brownstone
- Kina Collins (born 1991), American political activist
- Kina Grannis (born 1985), American guitarist and singer-songwriter
- Kina Konova (1872–1952), Bulgarian educator, translator, publicist and women's rights activist
- Kina Malpartida (born 1980), Peruvian boxer

== Surname ==
- Gunsanad Kina (1840–1930), Malaysian politician
- Laura Kina (born 1973), American artist and academic
- Pascal Kina, Belgian field hockey coach
- Sedomon Gunsanad Kina (1894–1966), Malaysian politician, son of Gunsanad
- Shoukichi Kina (born 1948), Japanese rock musician and politician
- Tetsuhiro Kina (born 1976), Japanese football player
- Tsubasa Kina (喜納翼), Japanese wheelchair racer

=== Fictional characters ===
- Kina, a character from Fantasian
- Kina, a character from Hyper Psychic Geo Garaga
- Kina, a character from The Black Company
- Muja Kina, a character from Yandere Simulator
