= Keningau =

Keningau Keningau
- Town and district capital
- Pekan Keningau; Keningau Town

Other transcription(s)
  - Kadazandusun: Koningou
  - Chinese: 根地咬 (Simplified) 根地咬 (Traditional); Gēndeyǎo (Hanyu Pinyin)
- Etymology: Derived from koningau, a local cinnamon tree species.
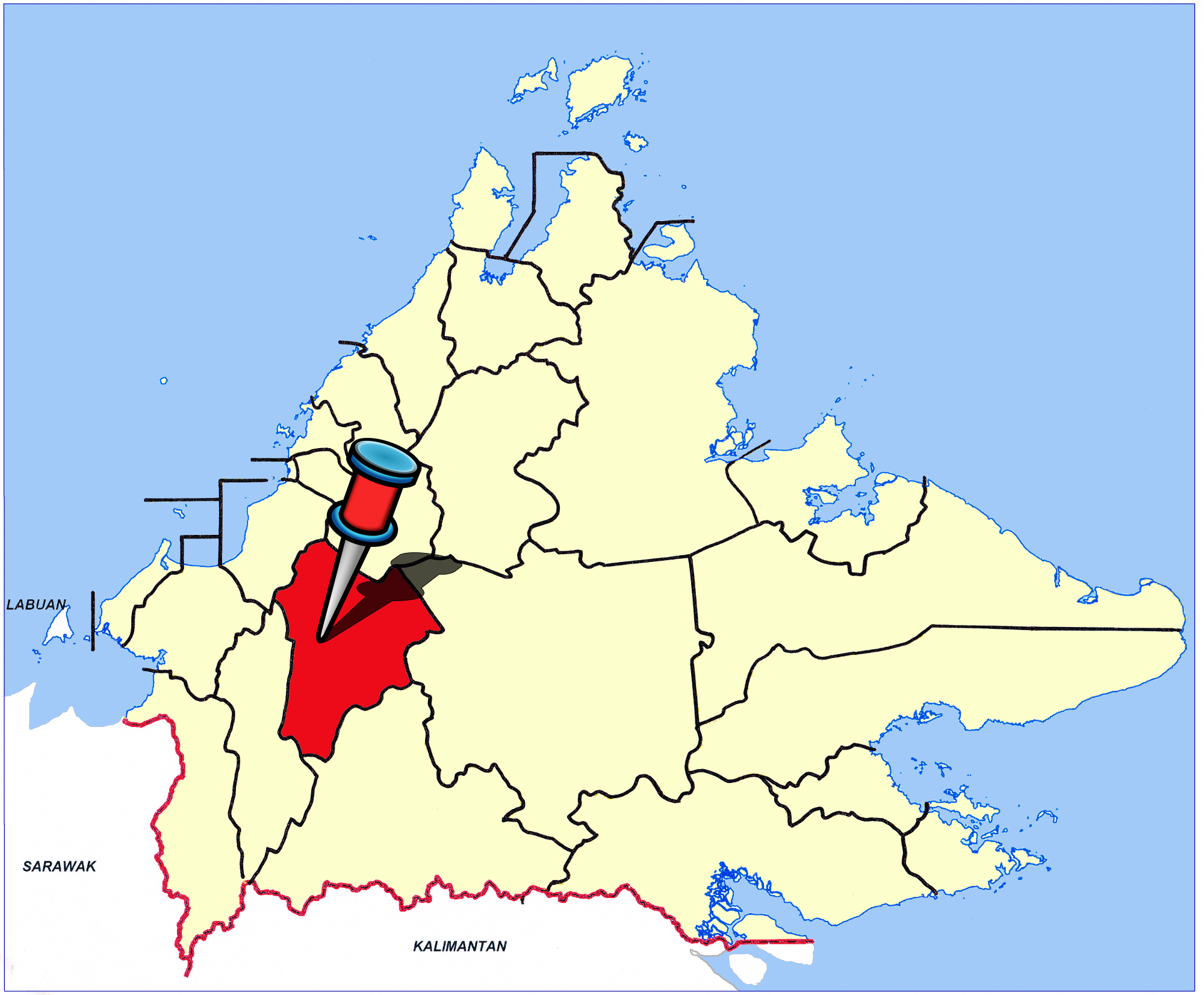
- Location of Keningau in Sabah
- Coordinates: 5°20′16″N 116°09′37″E
- Country: Malaysia
- State: Sabah
- Division: Interior
- District: Keningau
- Municipality: 1 January 2022

Government
  - Type: Keningau District Council
  - District Officer: Norsih bin Nusuri

Area
  - Total: 810.82 km^{2} (313.06 sq mi)

Population (2025)
  - Total: 157,800
- Estimated population of Keningau District
- Time zone: UTC+8
- Postcode: 89xxx
- Area code: 087
- Vehicle registration: SU

Keningau (Malay: Pekan Keningau) is the capital of the Keningau District in the Interior Division of Sabah, Malaysia. It is the fifth-largest town in Sabah, as well one of the oldest. Keningau is between Tambunan and Tenom. The town had an estimated population of 173,130. Dusuns, Muruts and Lundayehs are the major ethnic groups in Keningau.

== Etymology and history ==
The name Keningau is derived from the locally-abundant Javanese cinnamon tree (Cinnamomum burmannii) which is locally known as koningau. The tree is known as 'Kayu Manis' in Malay and is sometimes referred to as the 'king of spices'. Its bark was collected by the British North Borneo Company to be sold as a spice. During the British colonial era, Keningau was one of the most important administrative centres in British North Borneo.

The Japanese used Keningau as one of its main administrative centres during their occupation of North Borneo in World War II.

== Town divisions ==
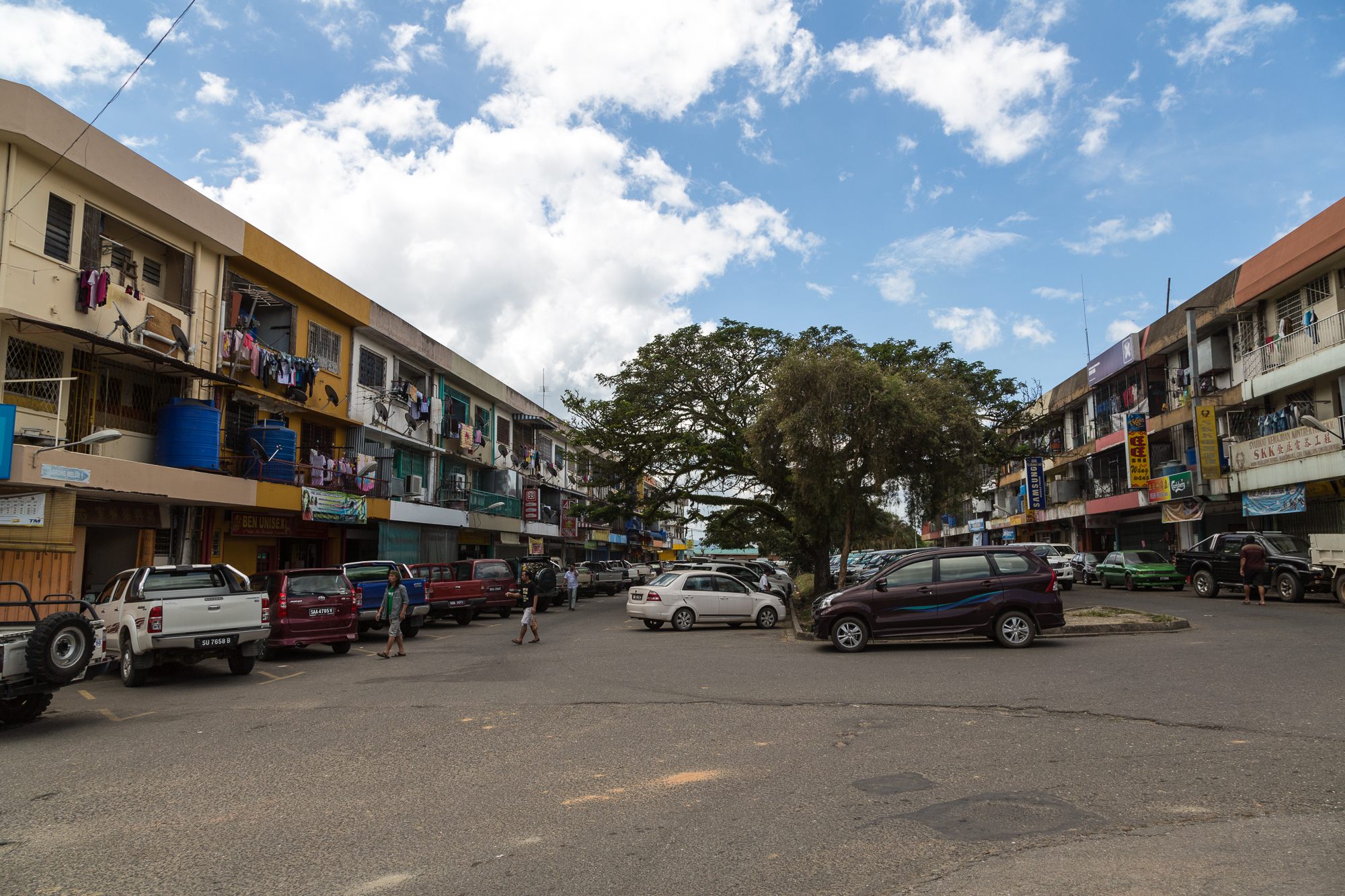
Keningau street view

=== Keningau 1 ===
The Keningau 1 is south of the Keningau Town. There is a commercial district with some of historical 'shop-houses.'

=== Keningau 2/New Town ===
Keningau 2 is the New Town, to the north of Keningau. The New Town houses the new Keningau Hospital. There are shops, shopping malls, and school.

== Demographics ==
=== Ethnicity and religion ===
Keningau's population was estimated in 2010 at 5,565. Of the total, 90% are Dusuns, Lundayeh and Muruts, 8% are Chinese (of whom most are proportionally divided into Hakkas and Taishanese); the balance is divided between other indigenous Sabahan races and foreign immigrants (legal and illegal) from the Philippines and Indonesia. The latter group forms a disproportionately large part of the population of Keningau as many of these immigrants come to seek employment in the many agricultural plantations in the district.

=== Languages ===
Apart from their native languages, the indigenous Sabahan ethnicities in Keningau mostly speak English, Malay (albeit a distinct Sabahan creole form of it). The ethnic Chinese population speak Sze Yup (a dialect of Cantonese), Hakka and Mandarin (varieties of Chinese) among themselves, but generally speak Malay when interacting with members of the indigenous races.

Most of the Indonesian and Filipino immigrants speak Malay in addition to their native languages.

== Climate ==
Keningau has a tropical rainforest climate (Af) with heavy rainfall year-round.

Climate data for Keningau
Month	Jan	Feb	Mar	Apr	May	Jun	Jul	Aug	Sep	Oct	Nov	Dec	Year
Mean daily maximum °C (°F)	28.6 (83.5)	28.7 (83.7)	29.3 (84.7)	30.0 (86.0)	30.1 (86.2)	29.8 (85.6)	29.5 (85.1)	29.5 (85.1)	29.4 (84.9)	29.3 (84.7)	29.2 (84.6)	29.0 (84.2)	29.4 (84.9)
Daily mean °C (°F)	25.3 (77.5)	25.3 (77.5)	25.8 (78.4)	26.3 (79.3)	26.4 (79.5)	26.2 (79.2)	25.8 (78.4)	25.8 (78.4)	25.8 (78.4)	25.8 (78.4)	25.7 (78.3)	25.6 (78.1)	25.8 (78.4)
Mean daily minimum °C (°F)	22.0 (71.6)	22.0 (71.6)	22.3 (72.1)	22.7 (72.9)	22.8 (73.0)	22.6 (72.7)	22.2 (72.0)	22.2 (72.0)	22.2 (72.0)	22.3 (72.1)	22.3 (72.1)	22.3 (72.1)	22.3 (72.2)
Average rainfall mm (inches)	146 (5.7)	136 (5.4)	144 (5.7)	138 (5.4)	203 (8.0)	148 (5.8)	126 (5.0)	123 (4.8)	141 (5.6)	177 (7.0)	168 (6.6)	175 (6.9)	1,825 (71.9)
Source: Climate-Data.org

== Places of interest ==
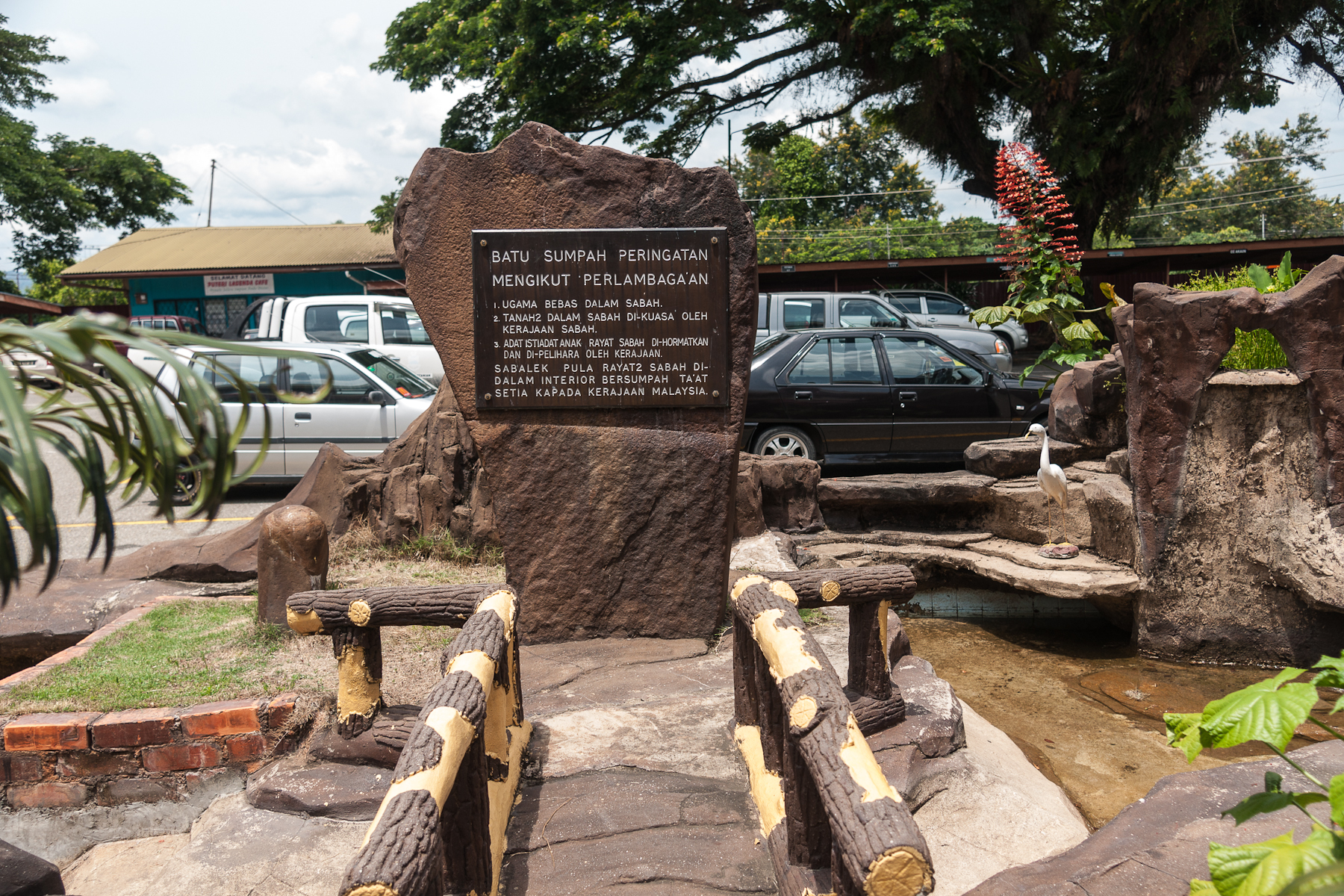
The Keningau Oath Stone

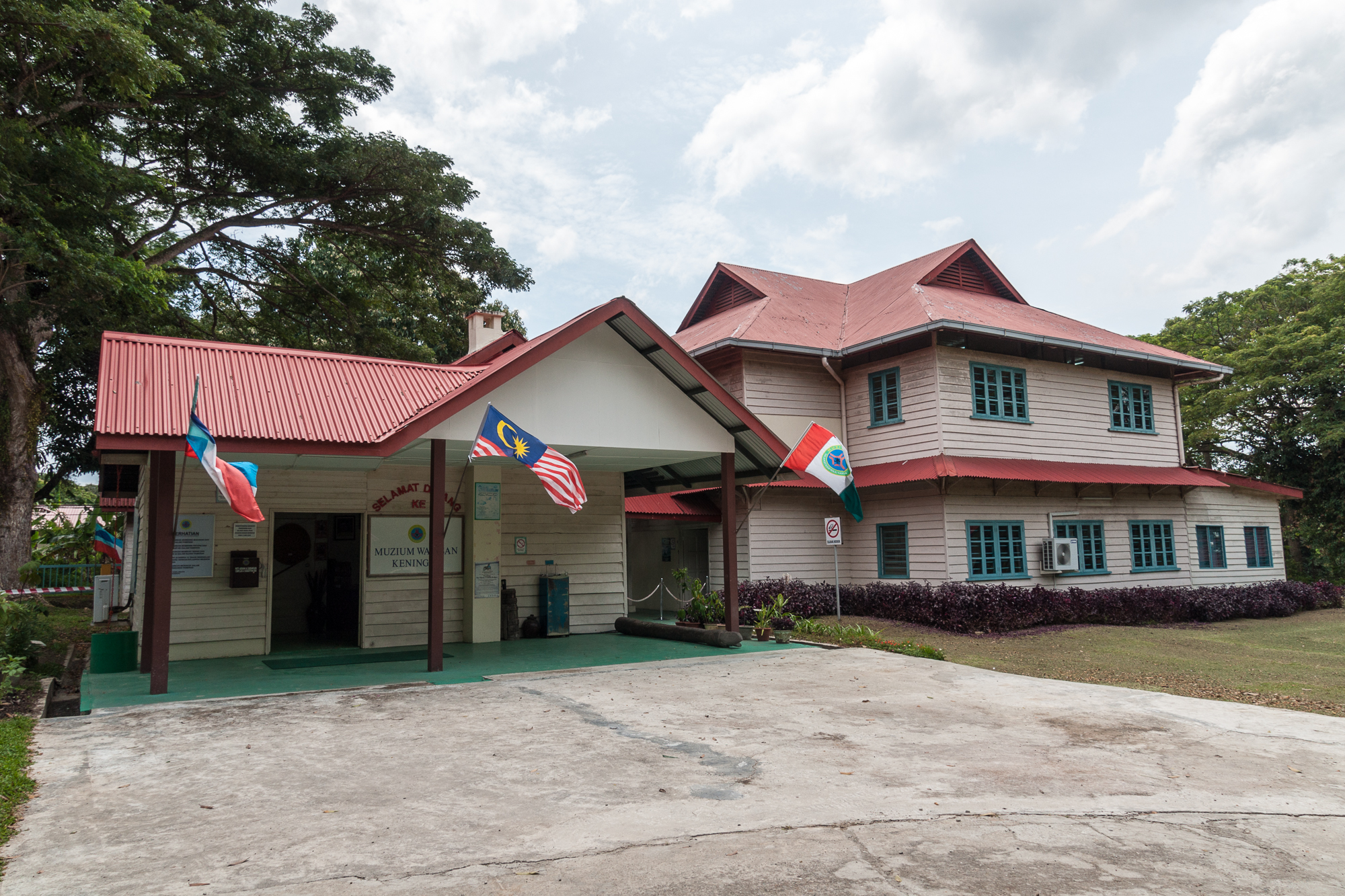
Keningau Heritage Museum

=== Keningau Oath Stone ===
This monument was erected to commemorate Sabah's entrance into the federation of Malaysia by Garukon Gurun, a former Sergeant Major of the legendary North Borneo Constabulary from Kampung Dangulad Keningau. It was unveiled and officiated on 31 August 1964. On the stone is a plaque setting out the federal government's promises to the people of Sabah, as well as the reciprocal promise of Sabahans to remain loyal to the federal government. The stone is in the compound of the Keningau District Office.

=== Crocker Range National Park ===
Crocker Range National Park covers 1,399 km^{2}, making it the largest park in Sabah. The park consists of hill and montane forest, with many species of flora and fauna endemic to Borneo. Maintenance of this forest cover is essential to ensuring a pure water supply for many of the towns and communities in Sabah.

The park contains at least five species of primates, such as orang-utans, gibbons, furry tarsiers, and sociable long-tailed macaques.

Facilities include an exhibition centre, insectarium, fernarium, observation tower, and trekking trail.

=== Keningau Handicraft Centre ===
Also known as Pusat Kraftangan Keningau, it is in Keningau New Town. It just 4.8 km from Keningau town. It is known for its scenic beauty and recreational facilities. It comprises recreational of traditional art, visual art, and all traditional things.

=== Kapayan Recreation Resources ===
The recreation resources located at Apin-Apin. It takes 25 minutes from Keningau Town to this location. It also has an alternate road with 26 km for people who want to go there to avoid the crowded traffic jam at the main road.

=== Matanoi Hill ===
Also known as Bukit Matanoi. It is located in Apin - Apin, Keningau. It is 23 km from Keningau town.

=== Bukit Trig ===
Bukit Trig is where people can go hiking. It is at Apin-Apin, Keningau, 20.2 km from Keningau Town. It is known for its beauty.

=== Keningau Mall ===
The main shopping area in Keningau is the Keningau Mall. It is a 4 story building, launched in 2010, located in Keningau Town and is the first shopping mall in the Interior Division of Sabah.

=== Tamu Ground Keningau ===
Tamu Ground Keningau is a weekly market held twice a week, Thursday and Sunday. As early as 5 am, traders begin to set up their stalls on Tamu Ground open space. Stalls available selling fresh local crops, freshwater fishes, seafoods, cheap gadgets and even souvenirs. Keningau's weekly tamu is a great place to experience the original local North weekly market scene.

== Communications and transportation ==
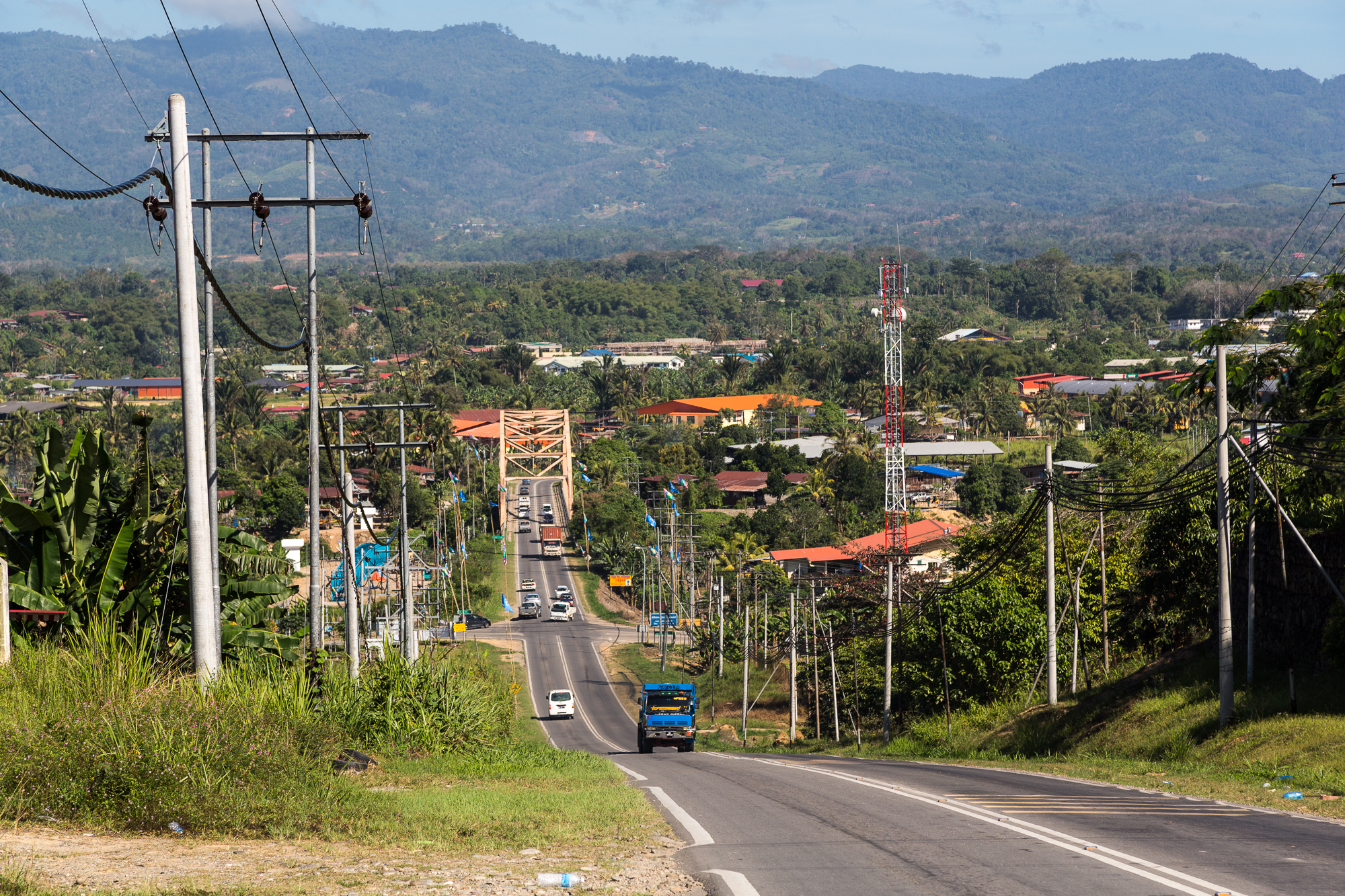
A road in Keningau

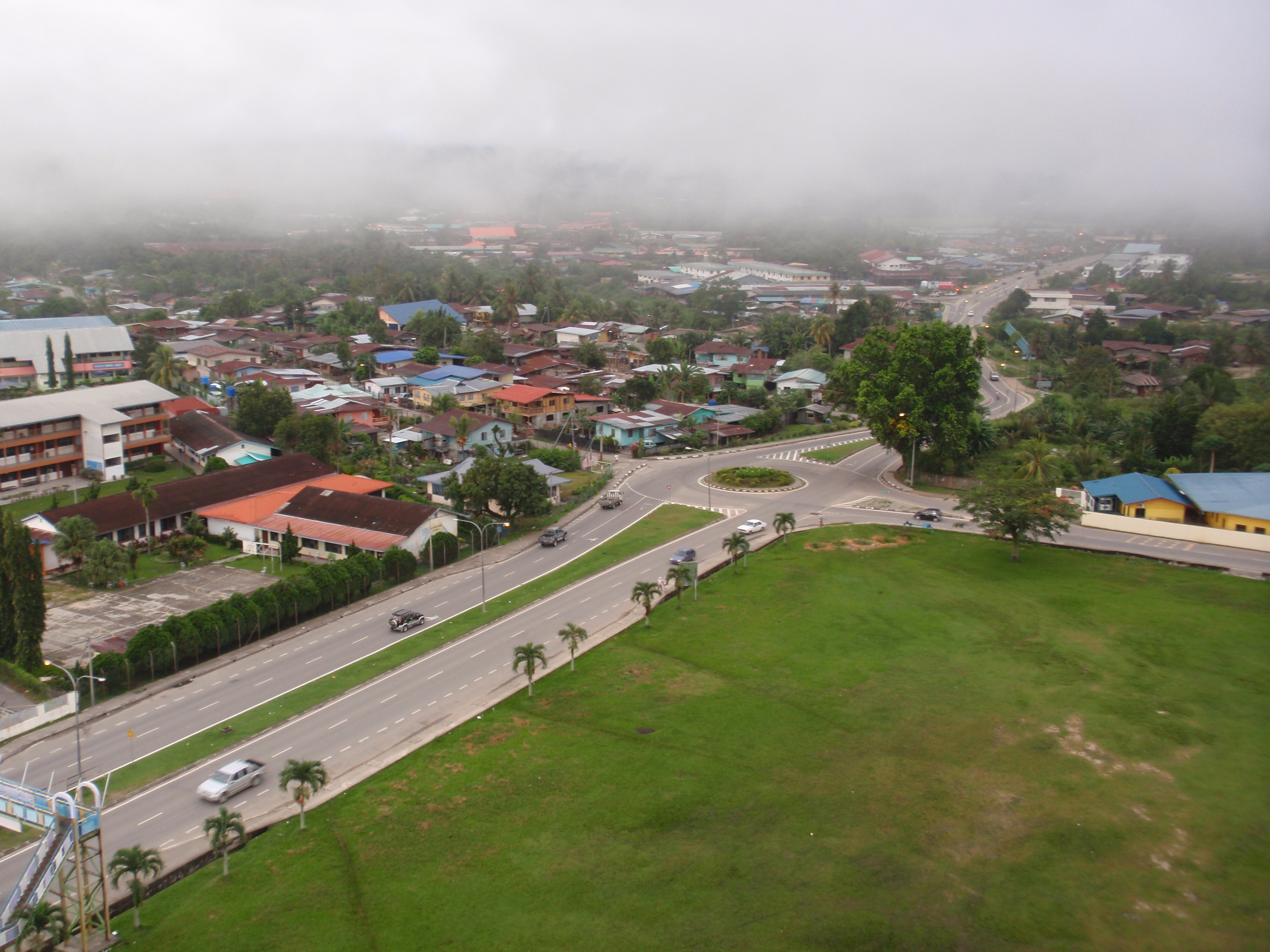
Dual carriageway in downtown Keningau

=== Road ===
Keningau is along the following highways:

- Kota Kinabalu-Papar-Kimanis-Keningau (Kimanis-Keningau Highway)
- Kota Kinabalu-Tambunan-Keningau-Tenom) (Malaysia Federal Route 500)
- Ranau-Tambunan-Keningau-Tenom-Kemabong (Interior North-South Highway)
- Keningau-Sook-Nabawan-Kalabakan-Tawau
- Keningau-Sook-Tulid-Telupid-Sandakan (Keningau-Sandakan Highway)

==== Public transportation ====
Long-distance coaches link Keningau with the cities of Kota Kinabalu, Sandakan, Lahad Datu and Tawau. In the town, public transportation is provided by minibuses and taxis.

=== Air ===
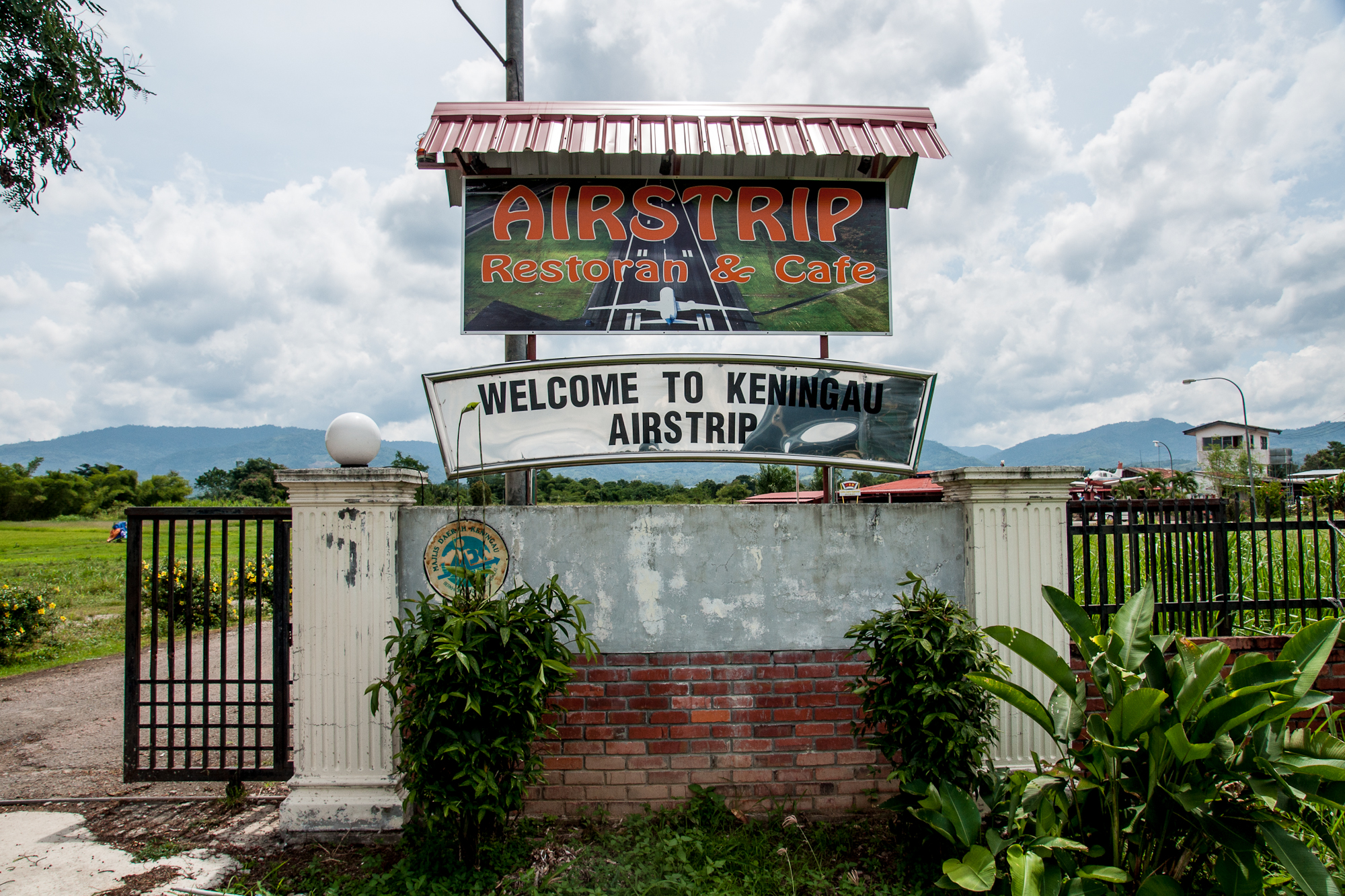
The main entrance to Keningau Airport

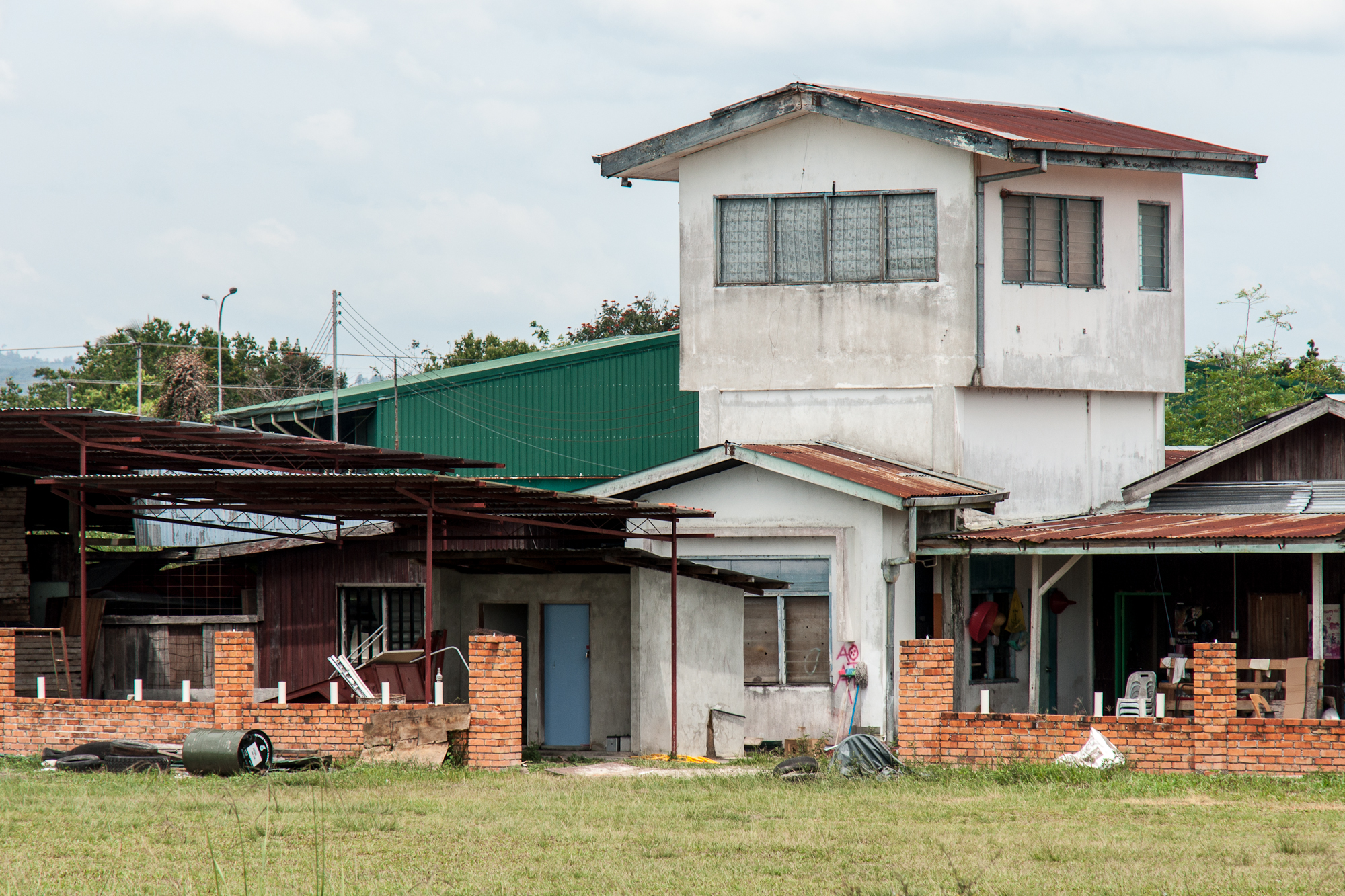
Keningau Airport's old control tower

Keningau Airport (Malay: Lapangan Terbang Keningau) (IATA: KGU, ICAO: WBKG) was last serviced by commercial flights in the 1970s. It is currently under private ownership.

=== Radio ===
Keningau has its own radio station, Keningau FM (which is government-owned and operated by RTM), the national public broadcaster (with frequency of 94.70 MHz or 98.40 MHz) with shows in Malay, Murut and Dusun languages. Keningau can connect to other radio station such as Ai FM, TraXX FM, Klasik FM, Nasional FM, Sabah FM & Sabah V FM. Some places in Keningau can connect to Astro Radio, Hitz FM, Era FM and MY FM. In addition, VOK FM is the first commercial radio station to launch in Keningau on 106.6 MHz

== Public services ==
=== Courts of law and legal enforcement ===
The Keningau court complex is on Jalan Nyamok (Nyamok Road). It houses the High, Sessions, and Magistrates courts.

The police headquarters is on Jalan OKK Sodomon (OKK Sodomon Road). There are police substations or pondok polis (literally 'police huts') in Apin-Apin, Bingkor and Sook.

=== Healthcare ===
There are plenty of public health clinics, one public hospital, one maternal and child health clinic, four village clinics, one mobile clinic and one 1Malaysia clinic in Keningau.

Keningau Hospital is a 212-bed hospital and it is a district hospital providing specialist services for outpatients and inpatients. It is the main hospital in the Interior Division and is visited by patients from the surrounding districts of Nabawan, Sook, Pensiangan, Tambunan and Tenom.

There are many pharmacies available in Keningau.

=== Libraries ===
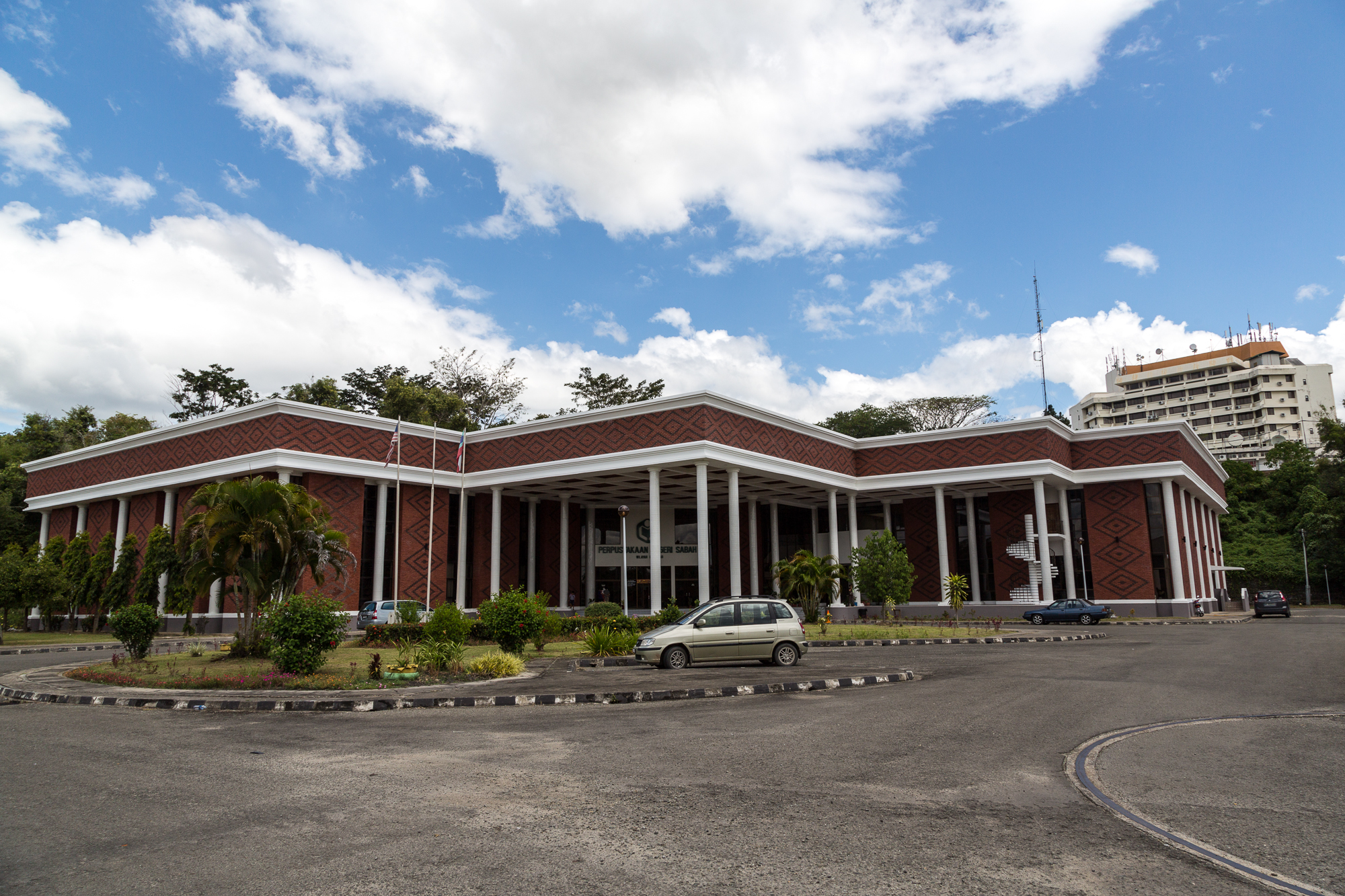
Keningau Regional Library

The Keningau Regional Library is one of three regional libraries in Sabah, the others being in Sandakan and Tawau. These libraries are operated by the Sabah State Library.

=== Sports ===
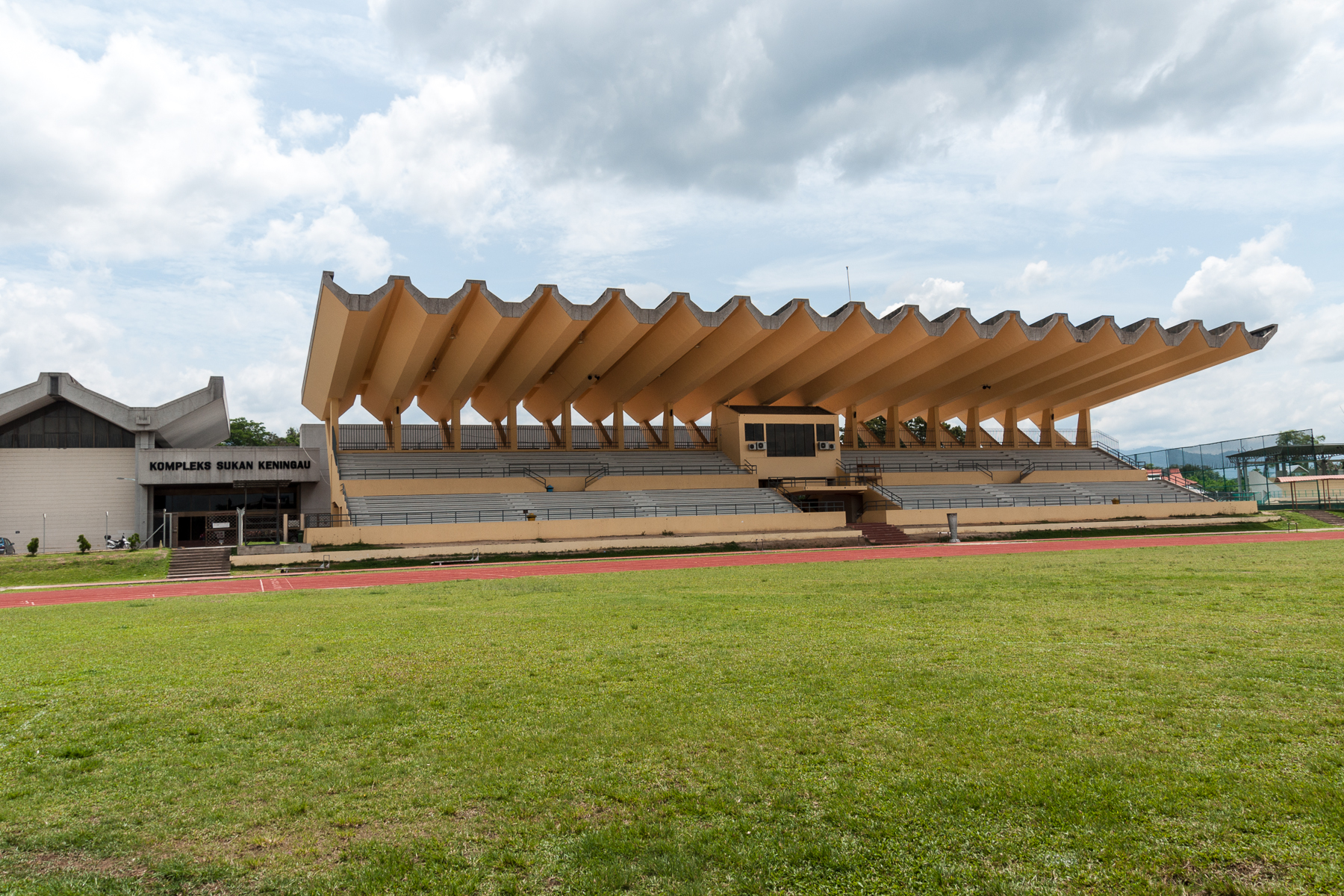
Keningau Sport Complex grandstand

The Keningau Sports Complex has facilities for badminton, tennis, volleyball and basketball as well as two stadiums for hockey and football. There is a 25m swimming pool. It hosted the 5th Sabah Games (SAGA) in 2011 and 9th Sabah Games (SAGA) in 2019.

Keningau Football Stadium has a capacity of 10,000. It is the home stadium for KDMM F.C.

== Education ==
There are many government or state schools in and around the town. The primary school in the town was

1. Sekolah Kebangsaan Ambual
2. Sekolah Kebangsaan St.James
3. Sekolah Kebangsaan Apin-Apin
4. Sekolah Kebangsaan Banjar
5. Sekolah Kebangsaan Batu Lunguyan
6. Sekolah Kebangsaan Rancangan Biah
7. Sekolah Kebangsaan Binaong
8. Sekolah Kebangsaan Bingkor
9. Sekolah Kebangsaan Bonor
10. Sekolah Kebangsaan Bulu Silou
11. Sekolah Kebangsaan Bundu Apin-Apin
12. Sekolah Kebangsaan Bunsit
13. Sekolah Kebangsaan Kawakaan
14. Sekolah Kebangsaan Dalit
15. Sekolah Kebangsaan Delayan Tulid
16. Sekolah Kebangsaan Kabatang Baru
17. Sekolah Kebangsaan Kalampun
18. Sekolah Kebangsaan Kampong Baru
19. Sekolah Kebangsaan Kampong Biah
20. Sekolah Kebangsaan Kampong Keningau
21. Sekolah Kebangsaan Karamatoi
22. Sekolah Kebangsaan Jaya Baru
23. Sekolah Kebangsaan Pekan Keningau
24. Sekolah Kebangsaan Inandung
25. Sekolah Kebangsaan Bariawa Ulu
26. Sekolah Kebangsaan Kapayan Baru
1. Sekolah Kebangsaan Lanas
2. Sekolah Kebangsaan Liau Apin-Apin
3. Sekolah Kebangsaan Luagan
4. Sekolah Kebangsaan Magatang
5. Sekolah Kebangsaan Mansiat
6. Sekolah Kebangsaan Membulu
7. Sekolah Kebangsaan Menawo
8. Sekolah Kebangsaan Merampong
9. Sekolah Kebangsaan Mamagun
10. Sekolah Kebangsaan Pasir Putih
11. Sekolah Kebangsaan Pohon Batu
12. Sekolah Kebangsaan Kuala Kahaba
13. Sekolah Kebangsaan Senagang
14. Sekolah Kebangsaan Sinaron Tengah
15. Sekolah Kebangsaan Sodomon
16. Sekolah Kebangsaan Sook
17. Sekolah Kebangsaan Membulu
18. Sekolah Kebangsaan Tuarid Taud
19. Sekolah Kebangsaan Tulid
20. Sekolah Kebangsaan Ulu Liawan
21. Sekolah Kebangsaan Ansip
22. Sekolah Kebangsaan Malima
23. Sekolah Kebangsaan Penagatan
24. Sekolah Kebangsaan Sinua
25. Sekolah Kebangsaan Meninipir
26. Sekolah Kebangsaan Malaing
27. Sekolah Kebangsaan Bunga Raya
28. Sekolah Kebangsaan Sinulihan Baru
29. Sekolah Kebangsaan Simbuan Tulid
30. Sekolah Kebangsaan Ulu Senagang
31. Sekolah Kebangsaan Gaulan
32. Sekolah Kebangsaan Petikang Laut Keningau
33. Sekolah Kebangsaan Binuwou Tengah
34. Sekolah Kebangsaan Rancangan Belia Tuilon
35. Sekolah Kebangsaan Binakaan
36. Sekolah Kebangsaan Bunang Sook
37. Sekolah Kebangsaan Lintuhun Baru
38. Sekolah Kebangsaan Nangkawangan
39. Sekolah Kebangsaan Nandagan
40. Sekolah Kebangsaan Binanon
41. Sekolah Kebangsaan Pangas
42. Sekolah Menengah Kebangsaan Keningau II
43. Sekolah Jenis Kebangsaan (C) Yuk Yin
44. Sekolah Jenis Kebangsaan (C) Yuk Kong
45. Sekolah Jenis Kebangsaan (C) Cheng Ming

For the secondary schools

1. Sekolah Menengah Kebangsaan Agama (SMKA) Keningau
2. Sekolah Menengah Jenis Kebangsaan Ken Hwa
3. Sekolah Menengah Kebangsaan Apin-Apin
4. Sekolah Menengah Kebangsaan Bingkor
5. Sekolah Menengah Kebangsaan Gunsanad
6. Sekolah Menengah Kebangsaan Gunsanad II
7. Sekolah Menengah Kebangsaan Keningau
8. Sekolah Menengah Kebangsaan Keningau II
9. Sekolah Menengah Kebangsaan Sook
10. Sekolah Menengah Kebangsaan St. Francis Xavier
11. Sekolah Menengah Kebangsaan Tulid
12. Kolej Vokasional Keningau

For higher/tertiary education, there are GIATMARA Keningau, Geomatika Commercial College and Sidma College. Universities such as the Open University Malaysia and UNITAR University have a campus here. Kolej Vokasional Keningau (KV Keningau) also offer higher education in diploma level.

== Culture and leisure ==
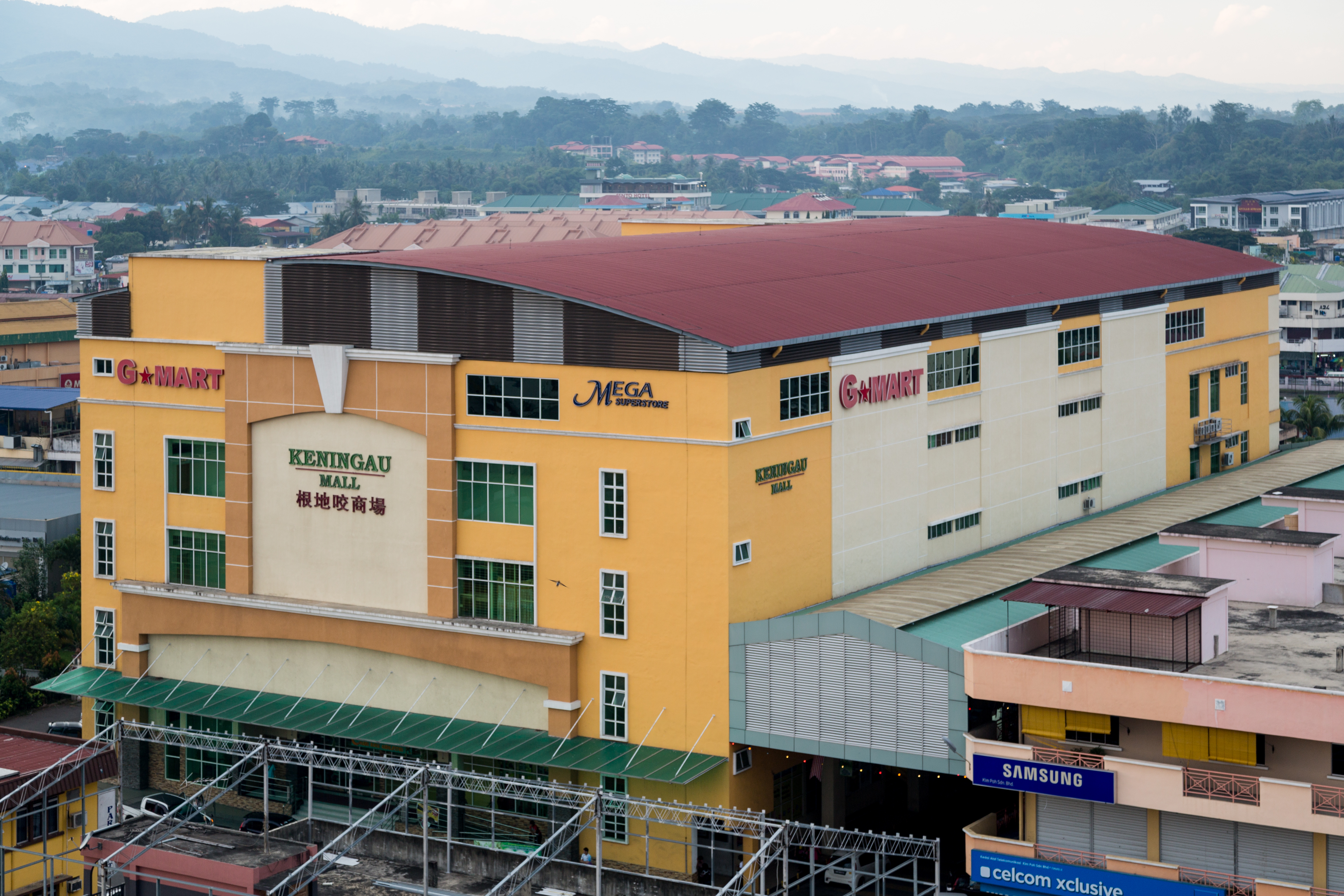
Keningau Mall is the first shopping mall in Interior Division

The main shopping area in Keningau is the Keningau Mall. Launched in 2010, it is located in Keningau Town and become the first shopping mall in Interior Division. In 2016, a new mall called Keningau Giant Mall has been launched and become the second main shopping destination for Keningau. It is located at the central of Keningau New Town.

== Cuisine ==
Keningau offer wide choices of popular local delicacies such as Char Kway Teow, Chinese Dim Sum, Nasi Lemak and local Kuih Muih

There are also variety of restaurants/vendors in Keningau that offer Western food, Chinese, Indian, Muslim, Japanese, even Indonesian and Philippines cuisines.

== Notable residents ==
Architecture & Engineering

- Garukon Gurun, the designer of the Keningau Oath Stone
- Gounon Lulus, the builder of the North Borneo Railway from Jesselton to Tenom with Arthur Joseph West

Economics & Business

- Datuk Arthur Joseph Kurup JP, economist, lawyer, politician (current MP of Pensiangan)

Entertainment

- Daphne Iking, Malaysian TV personality (birthplace and maternal hometown, paternal hometown in Tambunan)
- Tracie Sinidol, Malaysian actress and model (birthplace in Tambunan)

Politics

- Tun Ahmad Koroh, governor and head of state of Sabah (Yang di-Pertua Negeri of Sabah)
- Tun Adnan Robert, governor and head of state of Sabah (Yang di-Pertua Negeri of Sabah)
- Tan Sri Joseph Kurup, politician, lawyer
- Tun Datuk Seri Panglima Musa Aman, businessman, politician and current Sabah head of state (maternal hometown, paternal hometown in Beaufort district)
- Datuk Seri Panglima Dr. Maximus Ongkili, politician, researcher (settled only in this town during his adolescence for his secondary education, but his hometown is still in Tambunan)
- Datuk Orang Kaya Kaya (OKK) Sedomon Gunsanad Kina, the founding member of the Federation of Malaysia, the epigraphist of the Oath Stone and the 20-point agreement inscription
- Datuk Stephen R. Evans, politician, public administrator and author

Sports

- Alto Linus, former Sabah and Malaysian footballer
- Maxsius Musa, Sabah and Malaysian footballer

== See also ==
- Datuk Seri Panglima O.K.K. Gunsanad Kina
- Keningau Airport
- Kimanis-Keningau Highway
