= Keningau Heritage Museum =

Museum in Keningau, Sabah, Malaysia

- Muzium Warisan Keningau
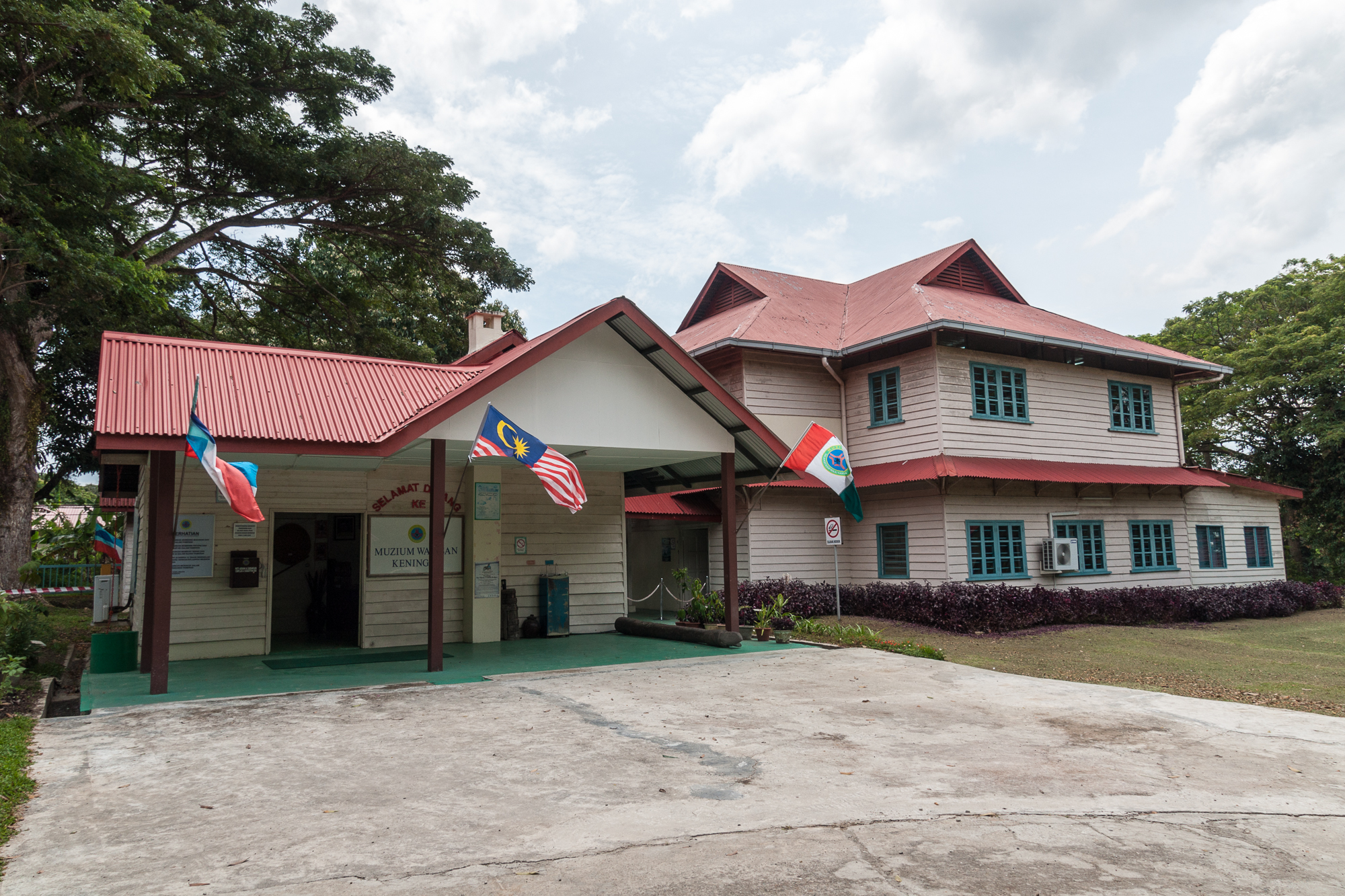
- Established: 2008
- Location: Keningau District, Sabah
- Coordinates: 5°20′44.58″N 116°09′28.83″E
- Type: Museum
- Owner: Sabah Museum

Keningau Heritage Museum (Malay: Muzium Warisan Keningau) is a museum located at Mahathir Park in Keningau District of Sabah, Malaysia.

== History ==
The museum is located in a former Government Rest House that was built by the Borneo Construction Company Ltd. during the administration of British Crown Colony government in 1946 and completed the following year. Both Malaysia's Prime Ministers of Tunku Abdul Rahman and Abdul Razak Hussein had both visited and stayed in the house before. In 2008, the house were officially turned into a museum.

== Features ==
The museum features local indigenous culture and heritage, history, zoology, ethno-botany, Islamic civilisation as well sports. On 9 September 2018, the Keningau Oath Stone were officially relocated into the museum area. The museum is one of the main tourism attractions in Sabah. In 2015, a former Aussie soldier who had married and stayed in Sabah with local indigenous native spouse donates historical items to the museum.

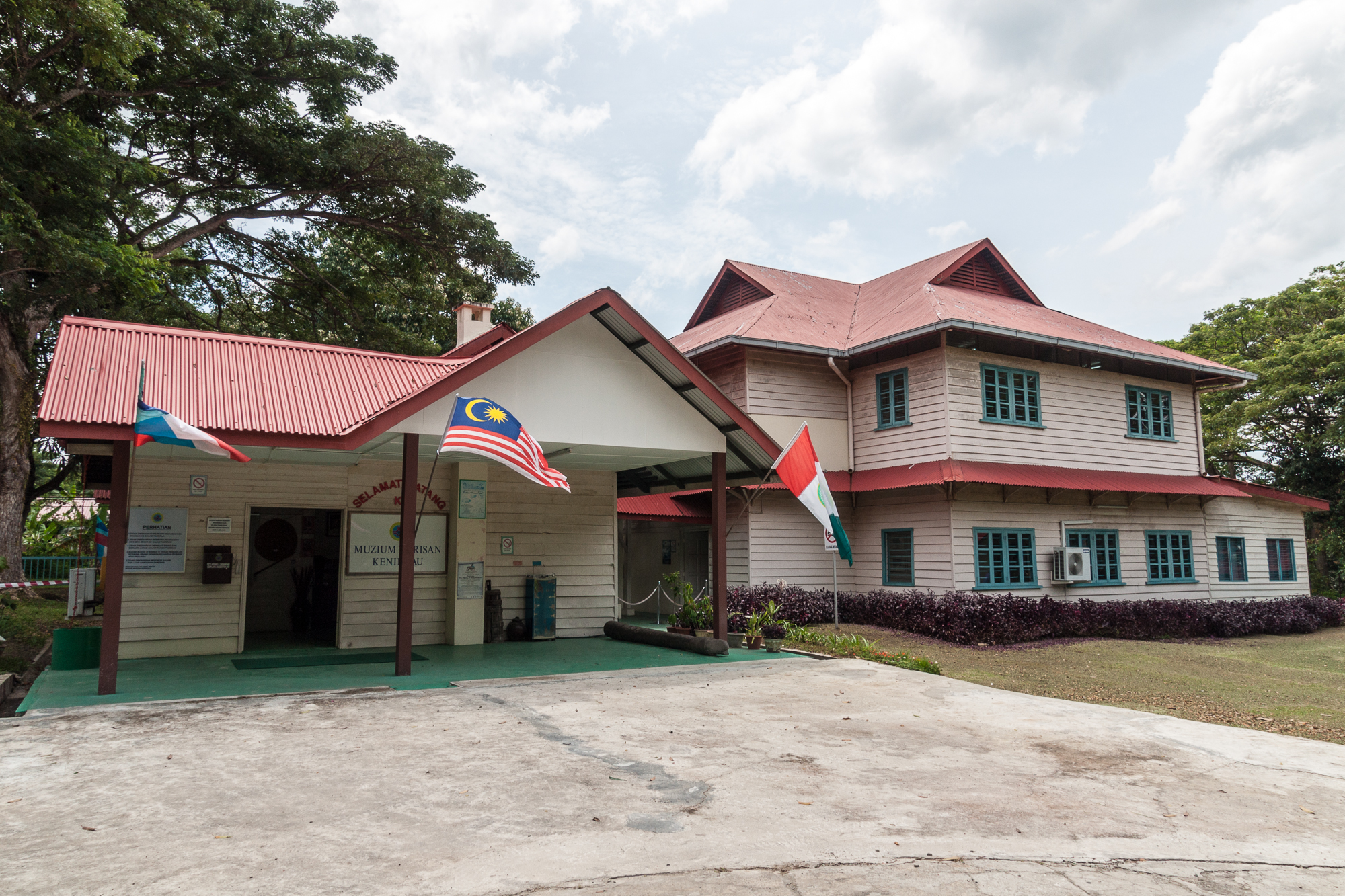
The museum as seen from outside.

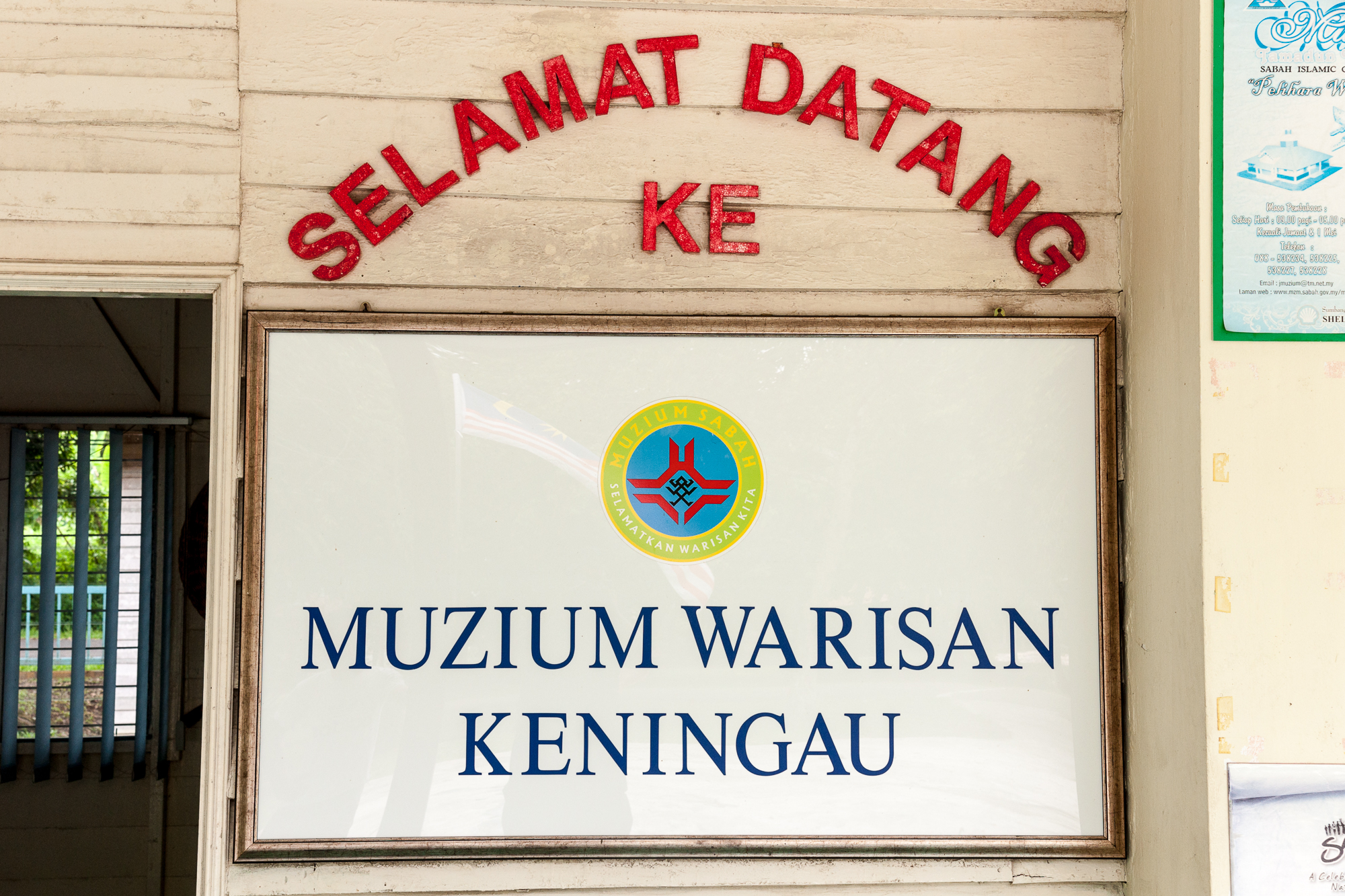
Signboard in the museum entrance.

== See also ==
- List of museums in Malaysia
