= Get You the Moon =

2018 single by Kina featuring Snøw

Single by Kina featuring Snøw

from the EP Things I Wanted to Tell You
- Released: March 15, 2018
- Genre: Lo-fi; pop; indie pop
- Length: 3:00
- Label: Columbia Records
- Songwriter(s): Snøw
- Producer(s): Kina

Kina singles chronology
"No Reason" (2017)	"Get You the Moon" (2018)	"I Still Dream of You" (2018)

Music video
- "Get You the Moon" on YouTube

"Get You the Moon" is a song by Italian Lofi producer Kina, featuring American writer and vocalist Snøw. It was released on March 15, 2018, and later re-released under Columbia Records on October 8, 2018. A music video was released on the MrSuicideSheep YouTube channel on April 3, 2019. The song featured on Kina's debut EP Things I Wanted to Tell You (2020).

The song has attained over 1 billion Spotify streams as of May 2024. It ranked second on Billboard's Top TV Songs list of March 2020, after appearing in an episode of the Netflix series On My Block. It was included as a "NOW What's Next!" bonus track on the 2019 US compilation Now That's What I Call Music, Vol. 71.

== Background ==
Kina discovered featured vocalist Snøw from listening to his covers on YouTube. The song was described by Idolator as a "moody chill-pop anthem" and "equal parts sad, romantic and oddly relaxing", and is 60 beats per minute and in the key of C# minor. The music video was directed and drawn by animation artist JonJon.

== Charts ==
=== Weekly charts ===
Chart (2019–2020)	Peak position
Australia (ARIA)	94
Belgium (Ultratip Bubbling Under Flanders)	20
Canada (Canadian Hot 100)	61
Italy (FIMI)	76
Portugal (AFP)	39

=== Year-end charts ===
Chart (2019)	Position
Australia Dance (ARIA)	70
Portugal (AFP)	115
Chart (2020)	Position
Australia Dance (ARIA)	29

== Certifications ==
Region	Certification	Certified units/sales
Australia (ARIA)	Platinum	70,000^{‡}
Canada (Music Canada)	2× Platinum	160,000^{‡}
Denmark (IFPI Danmark)	Gold	45,000^{‡}
France (SNEP)	Platinum	200,000^{‡}
Germany (BVMI)	Gold	200,000^{‡}
Italy (FIMI)	Gold	35,000^{‡}
Mexico (AMPROFON)	3× Platinum	180,000^{‡}
New Zealand (RMNZ)	2× Platinum	60,000^{‡}
Poland (ZPAV)	Platinum	50,000^{‡}
Portugal (AFP)	Platinum	10,000^{‡}
Spain (PROMUSICAE)	Platinum	60,000^{‡}
United Kingdom (BPI)	Platinum	600,000^{‡}
United States (RIAA)	3× Platinum	3,000,000^{‡}
^{‡} Sales+streaming figures based on certification alone.
