= Kuijau language =

Austronesian language spoken in Sabah, Malaysia

Kuijau
- Native to: Malaysia
- Region: Sabah
- Ethnicity: 7,910 Kwijau people (2000)
- Language family: Austronesian: Malayo-Polynesian; North Bornean; Southwest Sabahan; Dusunic; Dusun; Kuijau
- Writing system: Unwritten

Language codes
- ISO 639-3: dkr
- Glottolog: kuij1237

Kuijau (Kuiyow), also known as Hill Dusun, is an Austronesian language of Sabah, Malaysia.
