= Sedomon Gunsanad Kina =

Malaysian chief and politician (1894–1966)

Yang Berbahagia Datuk Seri Panglima O.K.K Sedomon Gunsanad Kina MBE SPDK
- Born: Sedomon Gunsanad Kina; 1894; Kampung Bandukan, Keningau District, North Borneo
- Died: 8 March 1966 (aged 71–72); Kampung Bandukan, Keningau District, Sabah, Malaysia
- Resting place: Bingkor, Keningau District, Sabah
- Political party: UNKO (1961–1962); Pasok-Momogun (1962–1964); UPKO (1964–1966)
- Spouse(s): Janibah Santul; Rose Duaya; Jaliah Amat; Salmah
- Family: Gunsanad Kina (father); Samson Sundang Gunsanad (brother); Tun Ahmad Koroh (nephew)

Sedomon Gunsanad Kina MBE (1894–1966) was a native chief of Keningau District, in North Borneo, who later became a politician in unified Malaysia. He was the son of Gunsanad Kina and the older brother of G.S Sundang.

Succeeded his father as clan leader and district chief of the interior of Sabah from 1936 until his death in 1966. As a district chief, he acted as a judge in social and legal disputes. He established the Native Administration Centre in Bingkor under the Chartered Company before World War II. His home, the Rumah Besar, was one of the grandest abodes in Keningau. It was used as the headquarters of the Japanese military during the Japanese occupation of Sabah in WW II

In 1962, Sedomon established the United National Pasok Momogon Organisation which he led with his brother Sundang. (Pasok Momogon means 'people of the country) The party controlled the vast majority of the interior area of Sabah. He was also a fine businessman who dealt in agricultural products like rubber, padi, cinnamon, horses, pigs, cows, and tobacco. Was conferred the title of Johan Mangku Negara, and made member of the Order of the British Empire.

== Background ==
Sedomon was given the title of Orang Kaya-kaya (O.K.K) after the death of his father, who was the previous Paramount Chief of the Interior and O.K.K for North Borneo. Sedomon served as O.K.K. from 1936 until his death in 1966.

Sedomon gained administrative experience in Bingkor while working under D.J. Jardine, the governor of the British North Borneo Chartered Company (BNBCC).

In 1936, OKK Sedomon heads the alliance of villages in Bingkor and has the authority to administer the Centre of Indigenous Administration (Pusat Pentadbiran Pribumi) in Bingkor. As a district native chief, Sedomon amicably settled disputes among villagers in Keningau according to native customary law.

=== Keningau oath stone for community acceptance ===
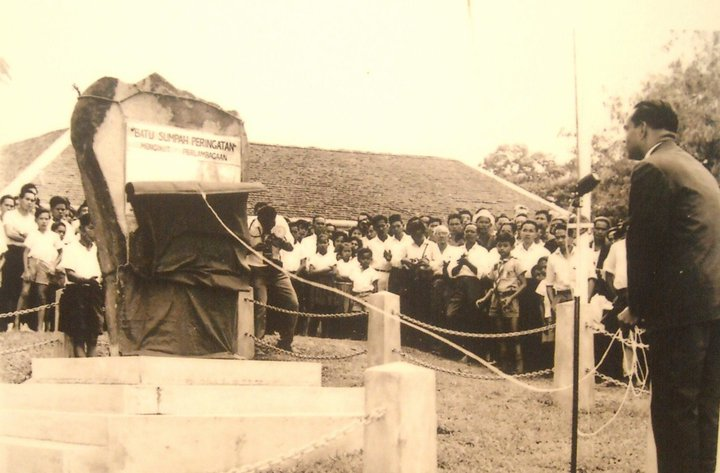
Tan Sri V. Manickavasagam officiating Keningau Oath Stone

Inscriptions on the Batu Sumpah Keningau partly detail Sedomon's ideas.

=== Establishing Kaamatan as a unifying holiday ===
In Sabah, each ethnic group has its own harvest festival, with the Kaamatan festival originally celebrated by the Kadazan Dusun group. Over time, and with the support of the government, the festival has come to be celebrated by all the people of Sabah.

In April 1957, one such harvest festival was held in the interior areas of Keningau, Tambunan, and Bingkor, upon the suggestion of native chiefs. In his capacity as Paramount Chief of the Interior, Sedomon asked the British to declare a three-days festival, later known as the Kaamatan. Although an ethnic Dusun (but he was also of mixed Murut blood), Sedomon's intention was for Kaamatan to be a day for all Sabah natives. However, the British acceded only when Fuad Stephens also made the request in 1960, and the first harvest festival organised at the level of the whole North Borneo was held in a mission school, St. Michael in Penampang.

== Role in the formation of Malaysia - 20-point agreement ==
Together with his younger brother, Sedomon was instrumental in forming and sustaining the North Borneo movement against the formation of Malaysia. The brothers founded the United Pasok Momogun Party (UPMP), a splinter party from United National Kadazan Organisation (UNKO) to protest the party's choice of supporting the formation of Malaysia. One of the points of contention was the grouping of two distinct tribes of Dusun and Murut into a single label of 'Kadazan'. The party was registered in January 1962, but despite being a multi-ethnic party with diverse representatives, UPMP's influence seemed limited to a few locations such as in Keningau, Tenom, Membakut and Kinabatangan.

Despite taking an anti-formation stand, there was very little opposition directed to the British colonial administrators or the Malayan government. While some interpret UPMP formation only as a direct challenge to UNKO vying for influence, UPMP maintained the anti-Malaysia position throughout the Cobbold Commission enquiry from January to April 1962, and the submission of the 20-point agreement to the Lansdowne Committee in August 1962 incorporated Sedomon's ideas on freedom of religion, immigration, and on issues relating to land, forest, and local government. Sedomon also presented his ideas to Tun Abdul Razak during a meeting at the Rumah Besar mansion. Tun Razak was quick to consider the practicalities of Sedomon's requests when he acknowledged that "If that is the case, people from the Peninsula would require a passport to enter Sabah".

UPMP's resistance had also began to weaken with internal differences and waning influence, especially when only 200 party members attended the party convention in September 1962 in Jesselton. The submission of a petition on 9 September 1962 to the United Nations to oppose the formation of Malaysia was done by G.S. Sundang together with Ong Kee Hui for Sarawak and A.M. Azahari for Brunei, although this had no impact and was later withdrawn by Sundang by 27 October 1962.

In November 1962, the North Borneo delegation was taken on a two-week trip throughout Malaya, at the beginning of which Sedomon said it was important for them to understand the concept of Malaysia, as many party members did not understand and "we are still undecided on Malaysia". He was able to visit the rural development schemes in the peninsula, which greatly impressed him.

Sedonom was considered a potential rival to Fuad Stephens, who was an ethnic Kadazan, for leadership among non-Muslim Sabahans.

== Honours ==
=== Honours of Malaysia ===
In 2016, Sedomon was posthumously conferred Sabah's highest award, Seri Panglima Darjah Kinabalu (SPDK), which carries the title "Datuk Seri Panglima".

- Sabah
  - Grand Commander of the Order of Kinabalu (SPDK) – Datuk Seri Panglima (2016)

=== Foreign honours ===
Sedomon was recognised for his achievements and contributions in British North Borneo and awarded an MBE by Queen Elizabeth II on 9 June 1961.

- United Kingdom
  - Member of the Most Excellent Order of the British Empire (MBE) – (1961)

== Bibliography ==
- O.K.K. Sedomon bin O.K.K. Gunsanad and his rumah besar. (1997). Sabah.
- Leong, C., & Sullivan, A. (1981). Commemorative history of Sabah 1881-1981. Kuala Lumpur.
- Leong, C. (1982). Sabah, the first 100 years. Kuala Lumpur: Percetakan Nan Yang Muda.
