= Keningau Airport =

Airport in Sabah, Malaysia

Keningau Airport Lapangan Terbang Keningau
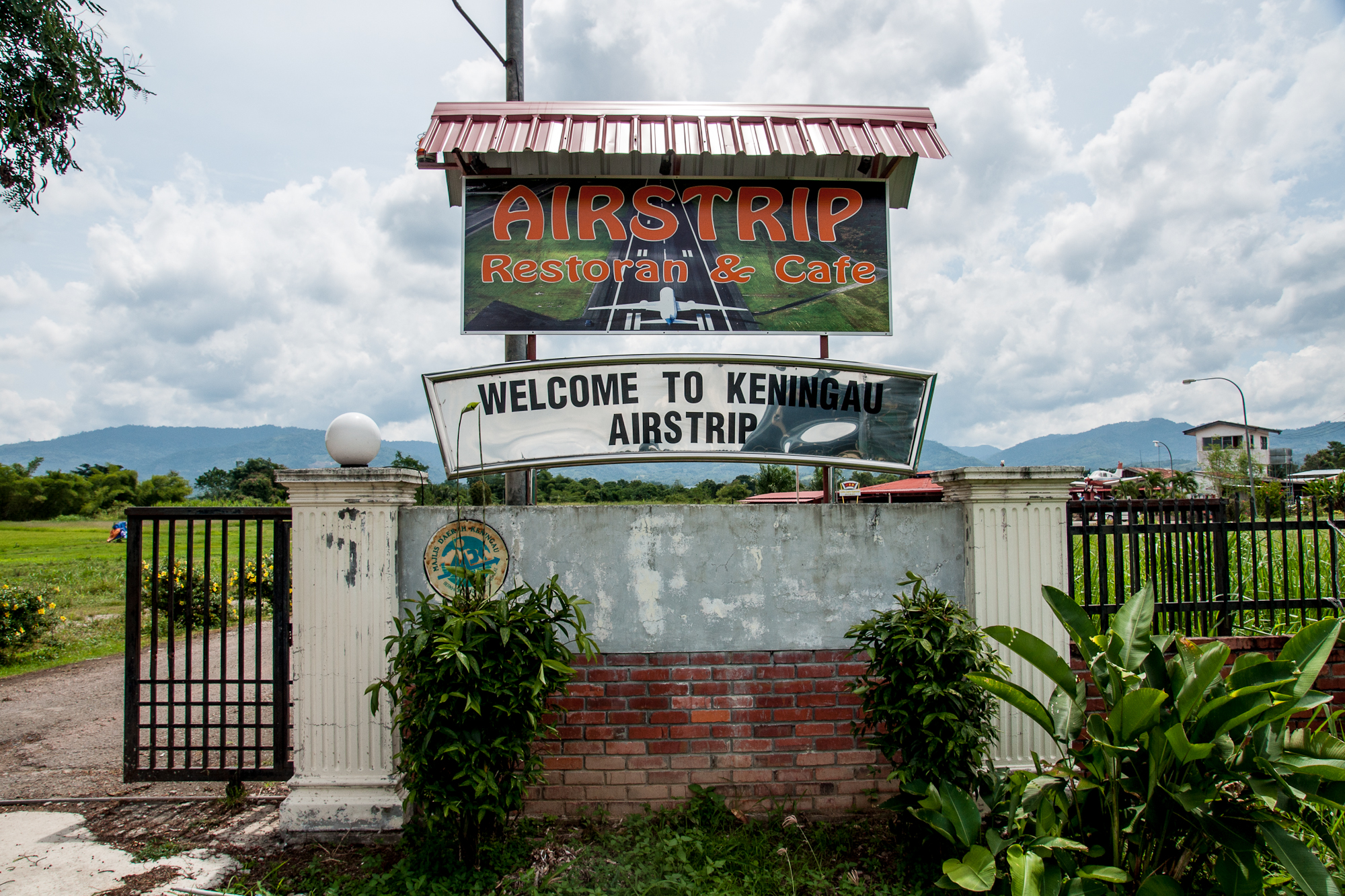
- The main entrance to Keningau Airport
- IATA: KGU; ICAO: WBKG

Summary
- Airport type: Private and public
- Owner: Government of Malaysia
- Operator: Unknown
- Serves: Keningau, Sabah, Malaysia
- Location: Interior Division, Sabah, East Malaysia
- Time zone: MST (UTC+08:00)
- Elevation AMSL: 1,036 ft (316 m)
- Coordinates: 05°21′19″N 116°09′54″E

Map
- Location in Malaysia

Runways
Direction	Length		Surface
Direction	m	ft	Surface
06/24	2,796	9,173	Grass
- Source: AIP Malaysia

Keningau Airport (Malay: Lapangan Terbang Keningau) (IATA: KGU, ICAO: WBKG), alternately Keningau Airstrip, is a privately owned domestic airport serving the city of Keningau in the state of Sabah, Malaysia. It is 2.5 km from Keningau Town.

== History ==
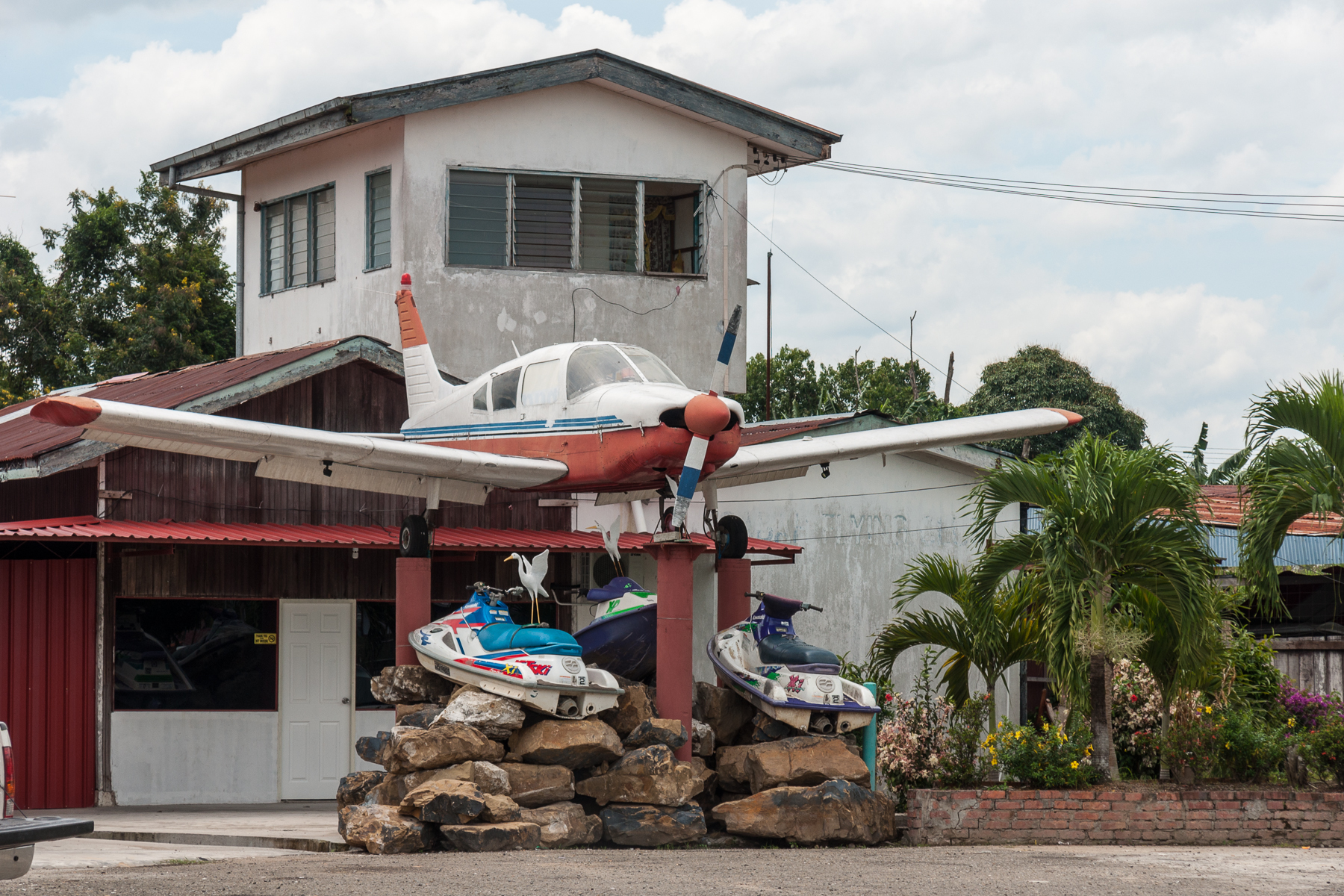
Keningau Airport's old control tower with Piper PA-28 Cherokee Aircraft Family at display

Many years ago, the Keningau Airport was used for aeroplanes with a small capacity like the BN-2 Islander and Fokker F27. The last flight to Keningau Airport for Malaysia Airlines was in the 1970s.

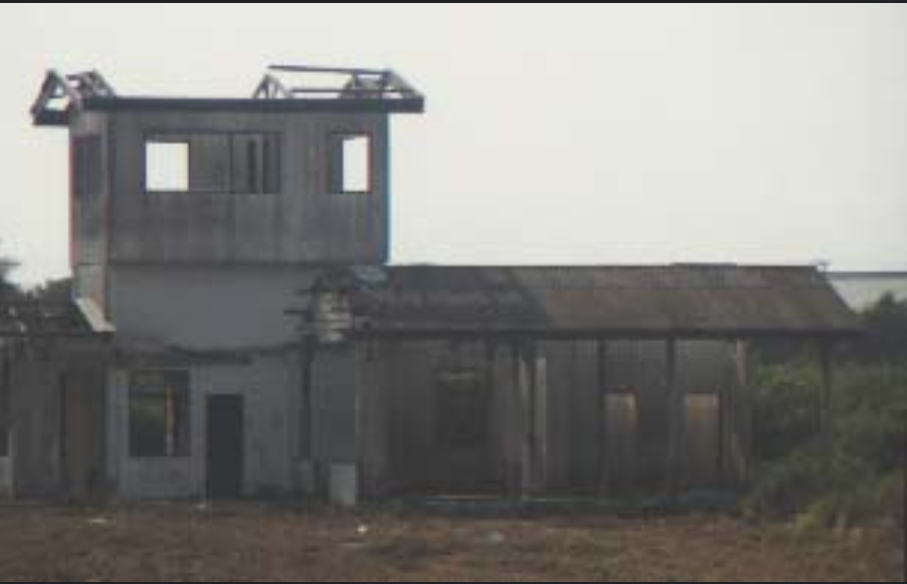
Keningau Airport after being abandoned

After the last commercial flight, airlines left the airport and the airport was abandoned for a few years, the terminal and ATC building was in a very bad shape during it being abandoned.

== Future ==
Parti Bersatu Sabah (PBS) Bingkor urged the State Government to explain its plan to use up 46,000 hectares of Keningau airport reserve land.

However, almost a dozen NGOs and Chinese associations here opposed the proposed cancellation of part of the 46,800 hectare airport reserve land on the Keningau-Apin-Apin road.

APS Vice President Paul Kadau claimed Kg Tuarid Liawan residents appealed for the relocation of the villagers to the Keningau Airport reserve land but it was rejected at that time. He said the airport is currently used by the Microlight Flight Sports Club. "It is understood that the Keningau Airport is privately owned and the question is who is the person? “Has the matter been brought up and discussed in the Sabah State Legislative Assembly?" he asked.

== Current time ==
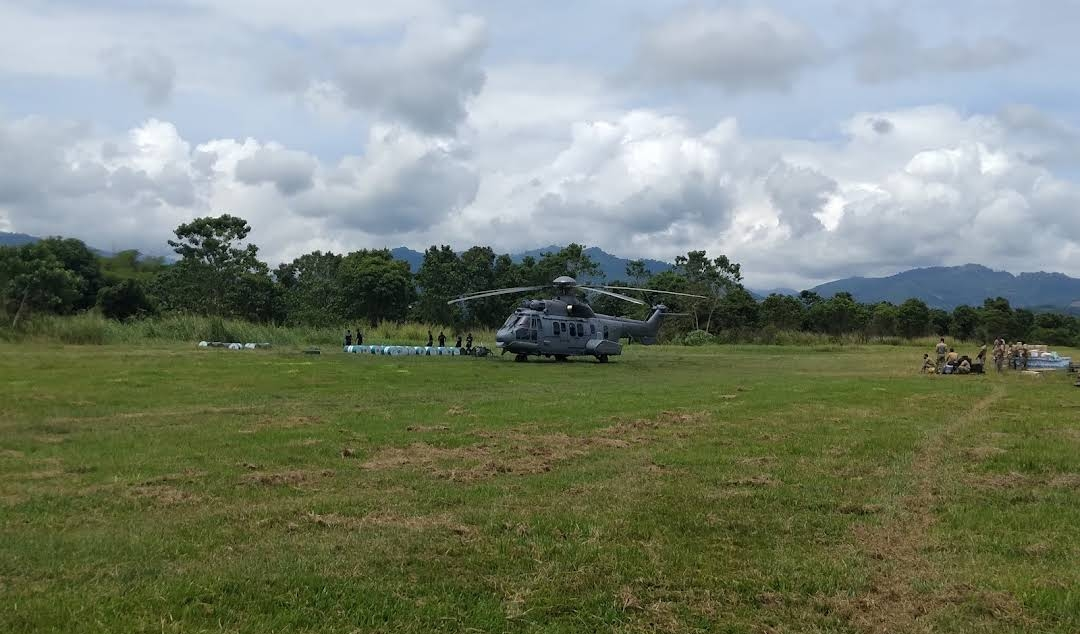
Eurocopter EC725 operated by TUDM in Keningau Airport

After the last commercial flight, the airport was temporarily abandoned since there were no longer airlines serving here, but in the mid 1980s, The Sabah Flying Club took over the airport and reopened it and it was operational until today, The airport is now used by The Flying Club, TUDM's helicopter stopover and sometimes used by Royal Malaysian Police Air Wing Unit

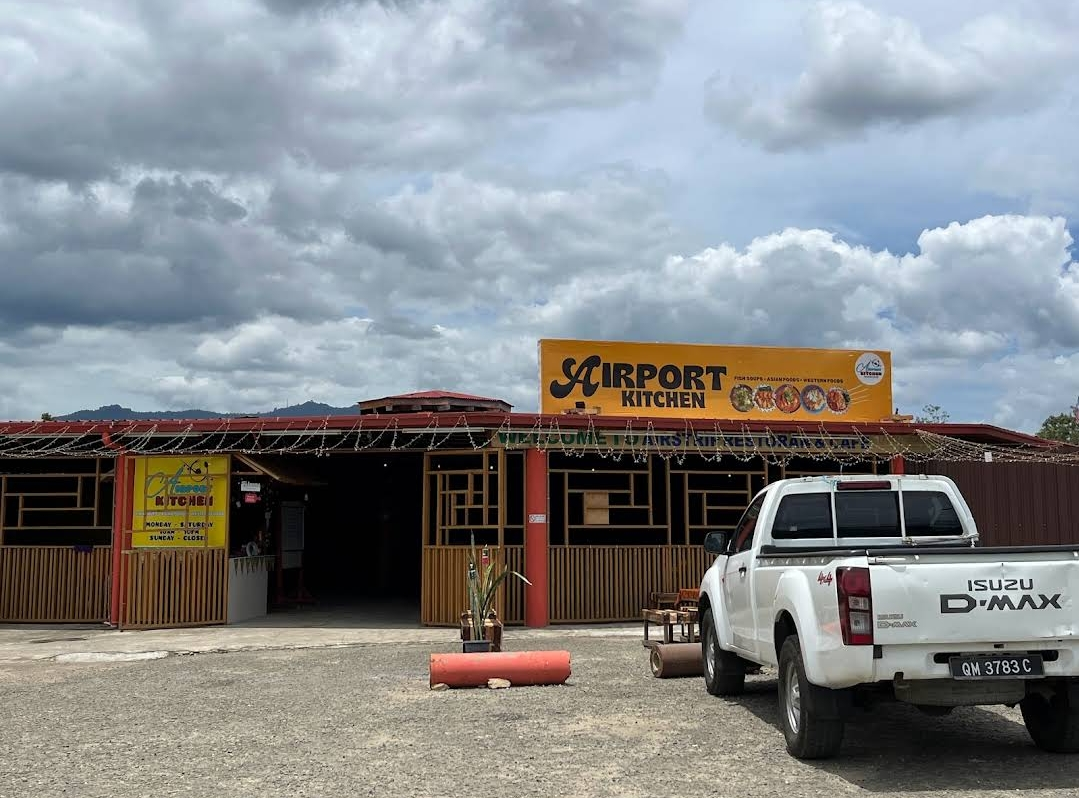
The terminal building that got turned into a restaurant after years of being abandoned

This was the former Terminal building at Keningau Airport that is currently now a Restaurant called "Airport Kitchen"

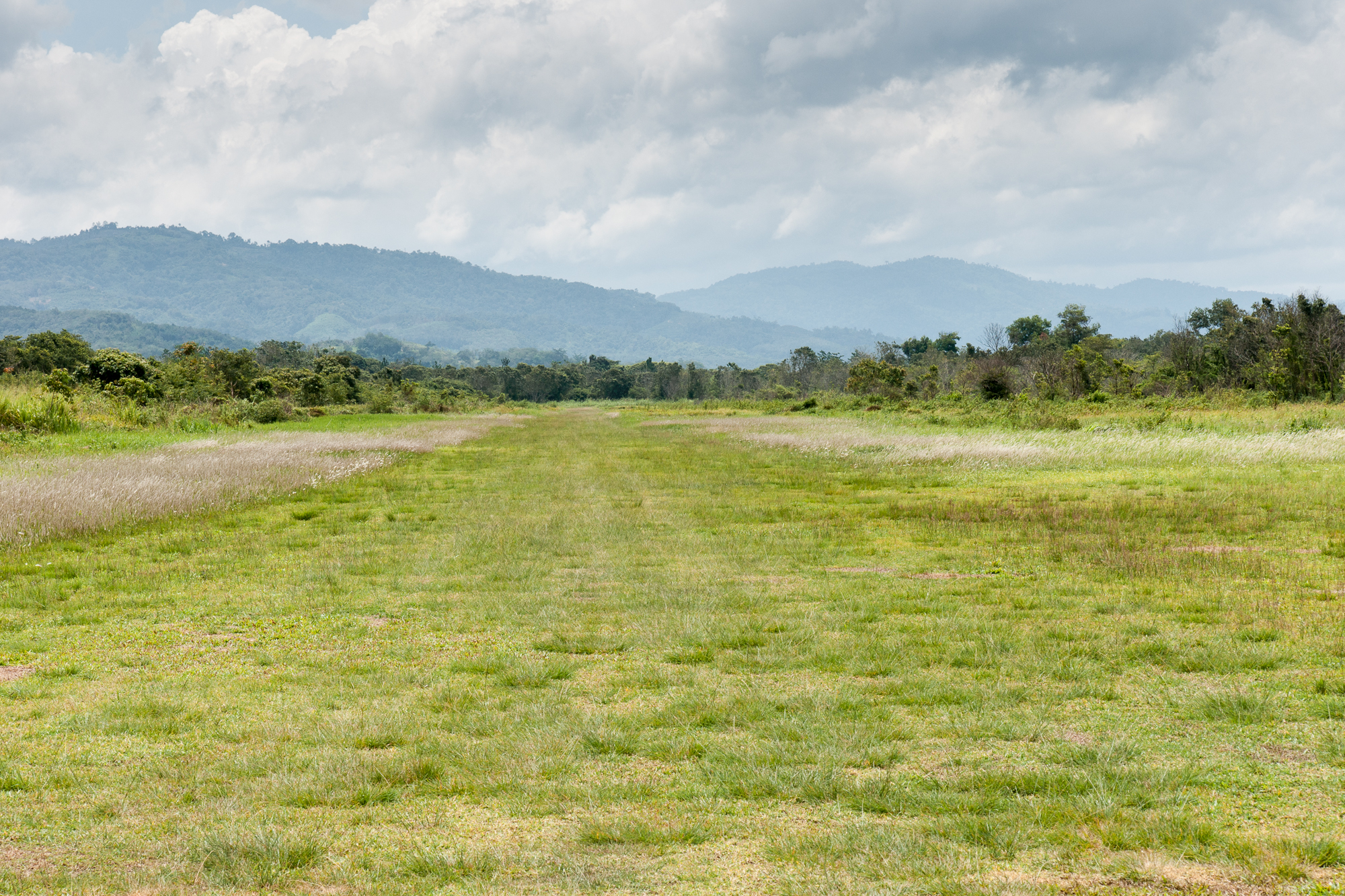
The Runway Of Keningau Airport

This is the runway of Keningau Airport, the Runway Number is 17 and 35. At this current time, the runway is now poorly maintained and not properly inspected, making it not suitable for large aircraft.

== See also ==
- List of airports in Malaysia
