= Bingkor =

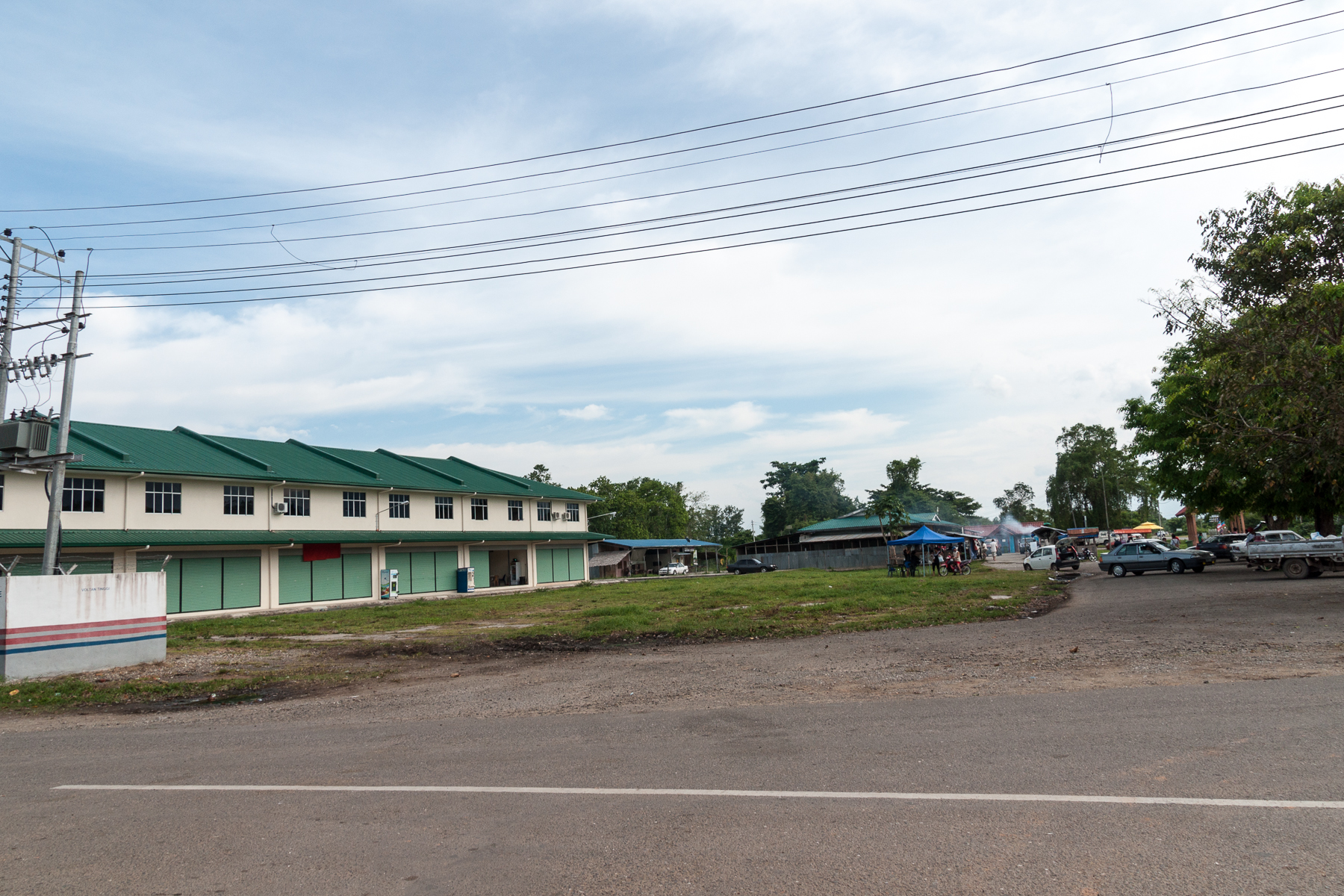
- Bingkor new shop lots

- Location within Borneo
- Coordinates: 5°24′0″N 116°12′0″E
- Country: Malaysia
- State: Sabah

Bingkor is a small township in Keningau District, Interior Division, Sabah, Malaysia. The majority of the population are Dusuns and Murut, which consists of part of the Borneo Dayak ethnic group. The Dusuns are divided into Dusun Gana and Dusun Kuyau, while the Murut is Nabai or Murut Keningau. Both these sub-Dusun families and the Murut people also represent the image of Keningau as a central district.

Bingkor is known as a place where the Dusun warrior, Gunsanad and the famous figure in the formation of Malaysia's time, OKK Sodomon came from.

Starting in 2019, the participant from Bingkor joined the Unduk Ngadau and Sugandoi competition as N.33 Bingkor (Presently N.40) for the first in the history that was held at Hongkod Koisaan KDCA, Penampang. The first participation also was bringing luck when the participant for Unduk Ngadau was listed in the Top 20th and 6th place for the Sugandoi competition. Unduk Ngadau is the beauty pageant competition that was started around the 60s while Sugandoi is the singing competition.

== Surrounding villages ==
Among the villages around this town are Kampung Bingkor Lama dan Baru, Kampung Singgah Mata, Kampung Sasaei, Kampung Bungkaon, Kampung Sandapak, Kampung Tuntumulud, Kampung Bandukan Baru, Kampung Minansut, Kampung Buang Sayang, Kampung Bunga Raya, Kampung Antolob, Kampung Bunsit and Kampung Bandukan Lama.

There are also several villages under the name of Mukim Bingkor such as Kampung Kuangoh, Kampung Kumawanan, Kampung Berungis, Kampung Jaya Baru, Kampung Baru, Kampung Lipasu, Kampung Sandapak, Kampung Antolob, Kampung Binaong, Kampung Labak, Kampung Awas-Awas, Kampung Liau, Kampung Baginda and so forth.

Mukim Bingkor covers a large area and affects the density and number of people in the Keningau district and this Mukim in particular.

== Facilities ==
There are schools around the town, such as the High School known as SMK Bingkor which also provided a high education level of form sixth and SK Bingkor for the primary education level.

Religious centres also can be found everywhere in this town. Since most of the people are Christians, there are many churches in this town. Another spiritual centre like mosques is also available here. For instance, the Catholic Church of St. Mary's, Evangelical Church of Borneo or Sidang Injil Borneo, True Jesus Church and the Nur Hidayah mosque of Bingkor.

There are infrastructure facilities that can be found, it is like Gymnasium Rakyat, Internet Centers, a Police small office, kindergartens, nurseries, the Native Court, the Office of the Secretariat N40 Bingkor, rows of shops and markets located in the region of Town Hall Open Bingkor.

There are also wellness facilities such as health clinics available in Bingkor operating during office hours. There is also the Office of Rural Development Corporation (KPD).
