= Gunsanad Kina =

Yang Berbahagia Datuk Seri Panglima OKK Gunsanad Kina SPDK
- Born: c. 1840; Bandukan, Keningau, Bruneian Empire
- Died: c. 1930; Keningau District, North Borneo
- Occupation: Native Chief
- Spouse(s): Randus (First Wife); Songkok (Second wife); Sinotoh (Third wife); Kiningkin (Fourth Wife); Eyin (Fifth Wife)
- Children: First Wife (Randus): Sungkia Gunsanad; Toyong Gunsanad; Ambidau Gunsanad; Saileh Gunsanad; Sedomon Gunsanad; Bandar Gunsanad; Isah Gunsanad; Jaimi Gunsanad; Tingkai Gunsanad; G.S. Sundang; Second Wife (Songkok): Todoyo Gunsanad; Kiwin Gunsanad; Loya Gunsanad; Linggai Gunsanad; Tumi Gunsanad; Sakunil Gunsanad; Dayang Gunsanad; Bosoi Gunsanad; Ingkoi Gunsanad; Tahip Gunsanad; Third Wife (Sinotoh): Radin Gunsanad; Giniab Gunsanad; Obot Gunsanad; Ubud Gunsanad; Fourth Wife (Kiningkin): Quilan Gunsanad; Fifth Wife (Eyin): Kuntia Gunsanad

OKK Gunsanad Kina born in about 1840 in Bandukan. He was a chief of the Dusun and Murut peoples. In association with Sampuun of Tambunan, he was one of the key figures involved in getting the British North Borneo Company (BNBC) to actively govern the interior region of the then North Borneo.
