= 1985 Lahad Datu ambush =

1985 attacks in Malaysia

- Part of Piracy in Asia and Cross border attacks in Sabah
- Location: 5°1′48″N 118°20′24″E; Lahad Datu, Sabah
- Date: 23 September 1985 – 24 September 1985 (1 day); Afternoon until next morning (UTC+8)
- Attack type: Bank robbery, robbery, random shootings
- Weapons: M16 rifle, machine guns, rocket launchers and hand grenades
- Deaths: 21 (excluding 5 perpetrators)
- Injuries: 11 (excluding 2 perpetrators)
- Perpetrator: Moro Pirates from the Southern Philippines
- Motive: Robbery

The 1985 Lahad Datu ambush was a series of robberies and random shootings that occurred on 23 September 1985 when 15–20 armed foreign pirates landed on the coast of Lahad Datu, Malaysia, and stormed the town. The pirates shot at random targets, killing at least 21 people and injuring 11 others, and stole some $200,000 from a local bank as well as another $5,000 from the Malaysia Airlines office.

== Background ==
Most areas in the east coast of Sabah are known for many Filipino communities, both legal and illegal. These areas have become a haven for pirates from the Philippines and Sabah itself has suffered 10 major attacks since 1976. On the evening of 23 September, a number of armed men clad in jungle green uniforms appeared in the town and started to shoot random targets. The shoot-out left the town with significant destruction and blood could be found everywhere. One of the victims, a pregnant woman, was shot while being driven home in a van. The van driver brought her to the hospital but she was pronounced dead on arrival. Another victim, a Chinese man, was injured by a gunshot during the raid. During an interview with him, he said that:

While I was walking around a coastal road, I saw eight men dressed in combat uniforms carrying M16 and machine guns running towards the centre of the town. Gunfire was then heard with men running towards me. I then hid in a cafe with the proprietor, huddled under a table and heard the continuous gunshots and explosions. I thought the town was under attack by the Philippine Army. Suddenly, I heard a bullet crashing the window and saw my leg was hit with it. I saw images of my wife and three children and I thought I would never see them again. But later I consider myself fortunate because I lived to see my family. But even so, I cannot help wondering about our government, which can't seem to defend us against these marauders.

The instability of the Philippines has caused major economic problems for Sabah. Philippine army raids against anti-Ferdinand Marcos factions in the Sulu and Mindanao islands have left many houses and fields destroyed, forcing an estimated 100,000 Moro people in the Southern Philippines to flee to Sabah. While many who have not left the Philippine islands have involved themselves in criminal activities, mainly on smuggling and armed robbery.

== Aftermath ==
After their successful attack, the pirates later retreated to a jetty where they engaged a group of Malaysian Marine Police. Two of the pirates were wounded during a shootout with the marine police, but still managed to carry their injured allies into two awaiting pump boats and made their getaway back to the Philippines. The following day, the Marine Police launched surprise attacks on an island which was believed to be their hide-out and managed to kill five pirates. While the rest of the pirates escaped to the international border, the police recovered a number of M16 rifles and a whole armoury of assorted weapons. An unverified report alleged that in their retaliation, the Royal Malaysian Navy brought four ships and three helicopters to attack a Filipino island, bombing the island's settlement, burning houses down and killing 53 Filipino residents. The Malaysian Embassy in Manila declined to comment on the report and said that the Malaysian embassy had not received any information from the Philippine government or from the Malaysia's capital of Kuala Lumpur.

== Reactions ==
- Malaysia – The Malaysian Government denied the allegations of a retaliatory attack to a Filipino island with both the Malaysian and Philippine governments hinting that an unnamed third party was responsible for the incident.
- Philippines – The Philippine Government protested the actions of the Malaysian Marine Police during the pursuit of the pirates to the international border, saying the Malaysian police had breached the borders of the Philippines. However, this allegation was retracted since there was no concrete proof.

== See also ==
- 2013 Lahad Datu standoff
- Anti-Filipino sentiment § Sabah
- History of Sabah
