= Madai Cave =

Cave in Malaysia

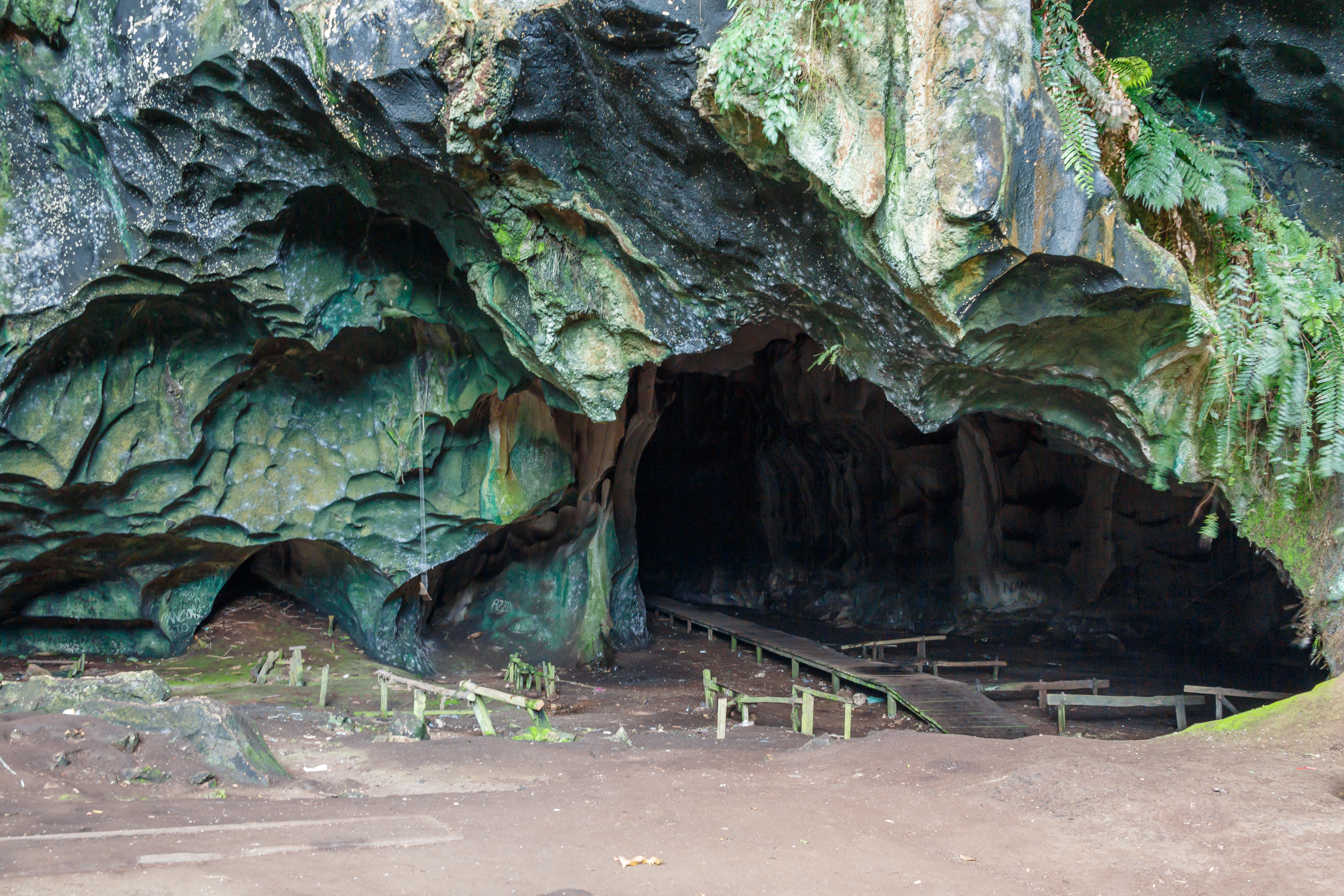
- Entrance to the cave.
- Interactive map of Madai Cave
- Entrances: 1

Madai Cave is a cave located in Kunak District, Sabah, Malaysia. It is an integral part of the limestone hills range located within the Baturong Madai Forest Reserve.

== Earliest human habitation ==
The earliest known human settlement in northern Borneo existed 20,000–30,000 years ago, as evidenced by stone tools and food remains found by excavations along the Darvel Bay area at Madai-Baturong caves near the Tingkayu River. There were also old burial sites in the cave although the identity of those buried there remain unknown to most villagers living near the cave.

== Bird nest harvesting ==
The cave is famed as a source for swiftlet's nests used in bird's nest soup, with demands largely come from the Chinese community especially during Chinese New Year. Twice a year (between February and April, and between July and September), licensed collectors risk their lives climbing to the roof of these caves using only rattan ladders, ropes, and bamboo poles precariously attached together. It is a special festival event for the local Ida'an villagers, who have held the rights to Madai Caves for over 20 generations. Although the Ida'an are the major producer, the community are not a consumer with the bird nest will be sold to a middlemen who in turn supply to consumers in Hong Kong and Singapore.

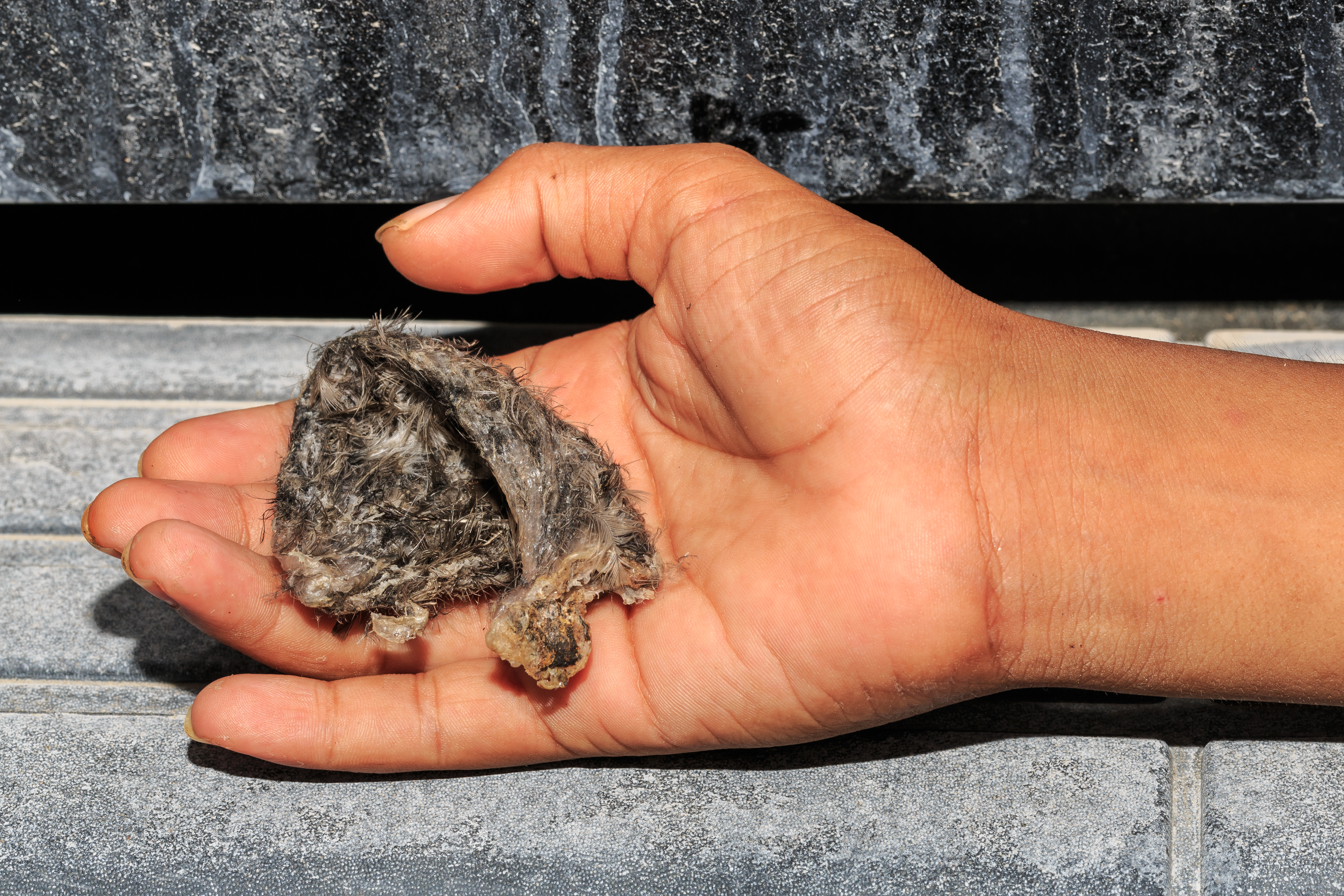
A swiftlet's nest from the cave.

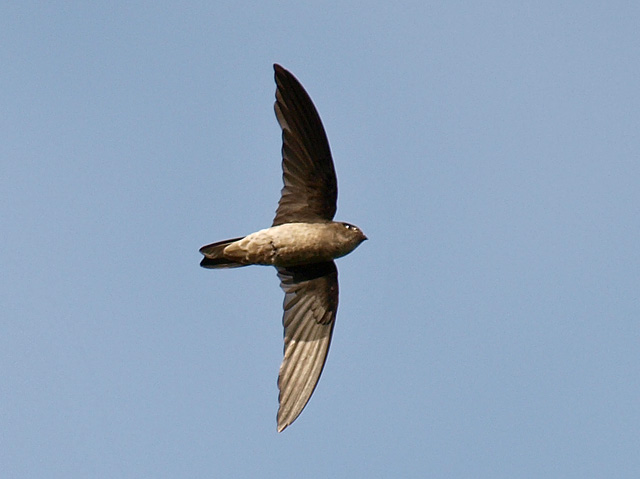
A black-nest swiftlet.

Beside the bird nest harvesting, phosphate deposits from the swiftlet and bat were also collected for use as fertiliser.

== In popular culture ==
The cave was featured during the American adventure race programme of Eco-Challenge in the 2000 edition, where participants had to climb rattan ladders.
