= Dusun people =

Indigenous ethnic group of Borneo

Dusun people Dusuns
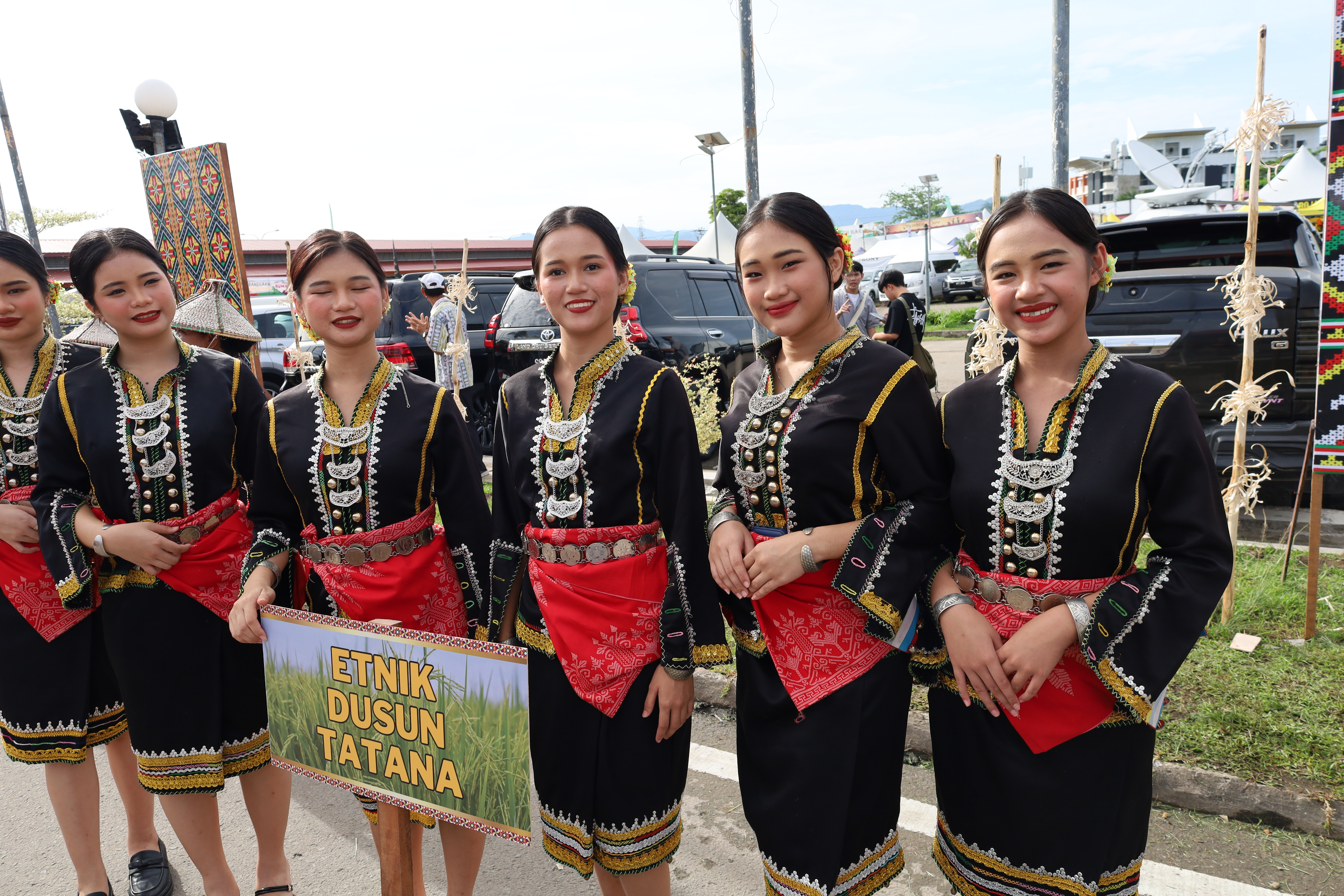
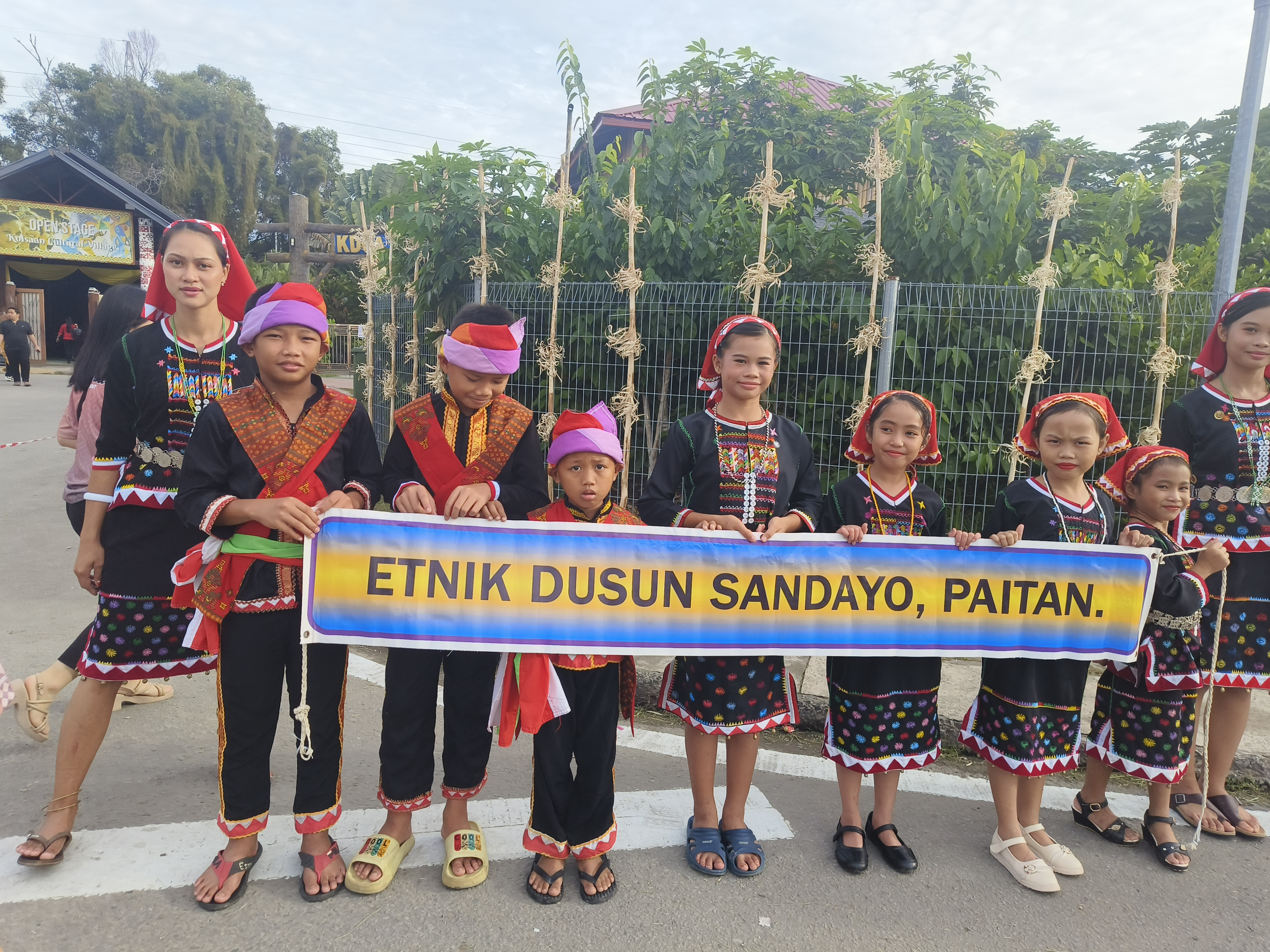
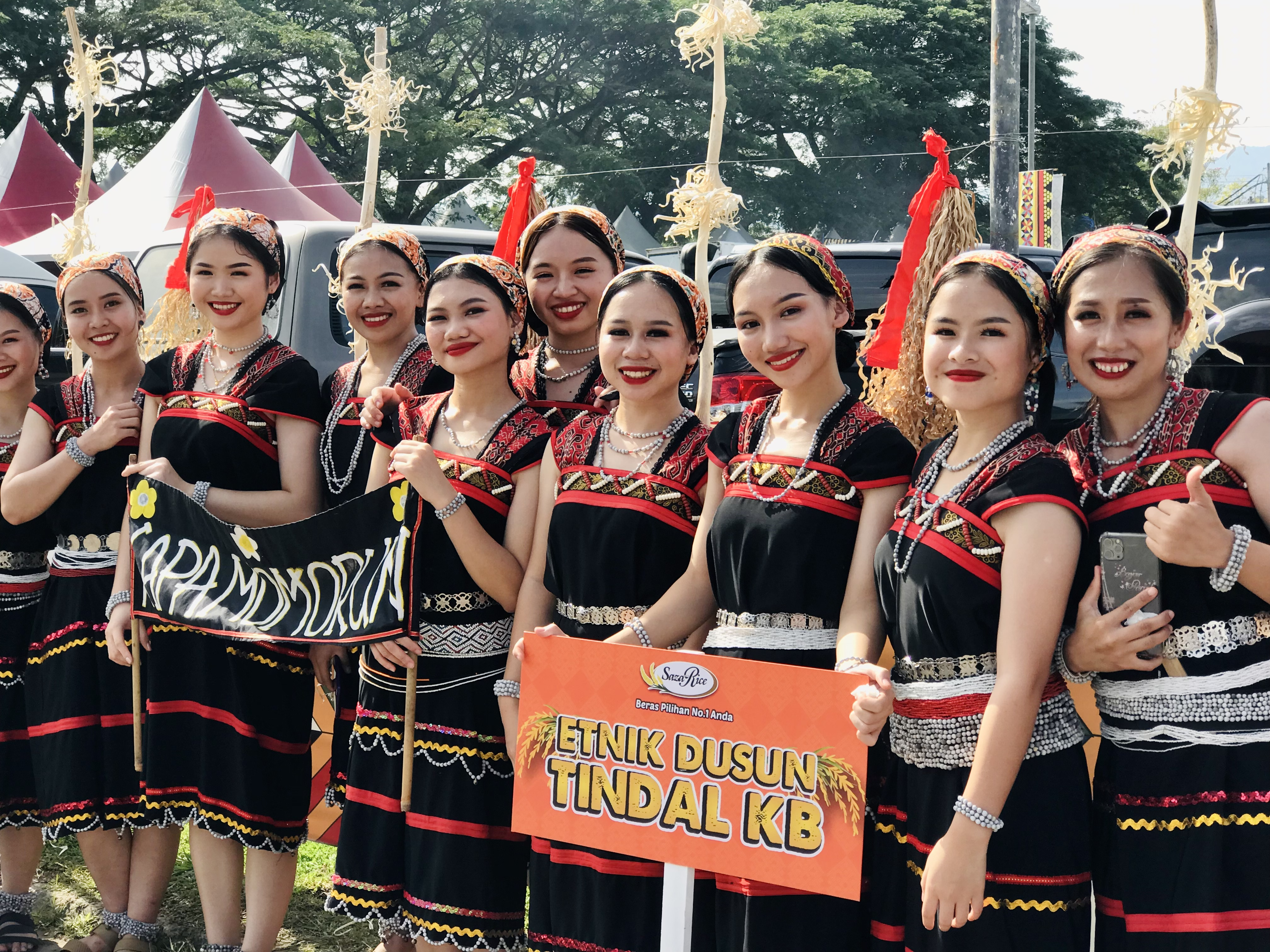
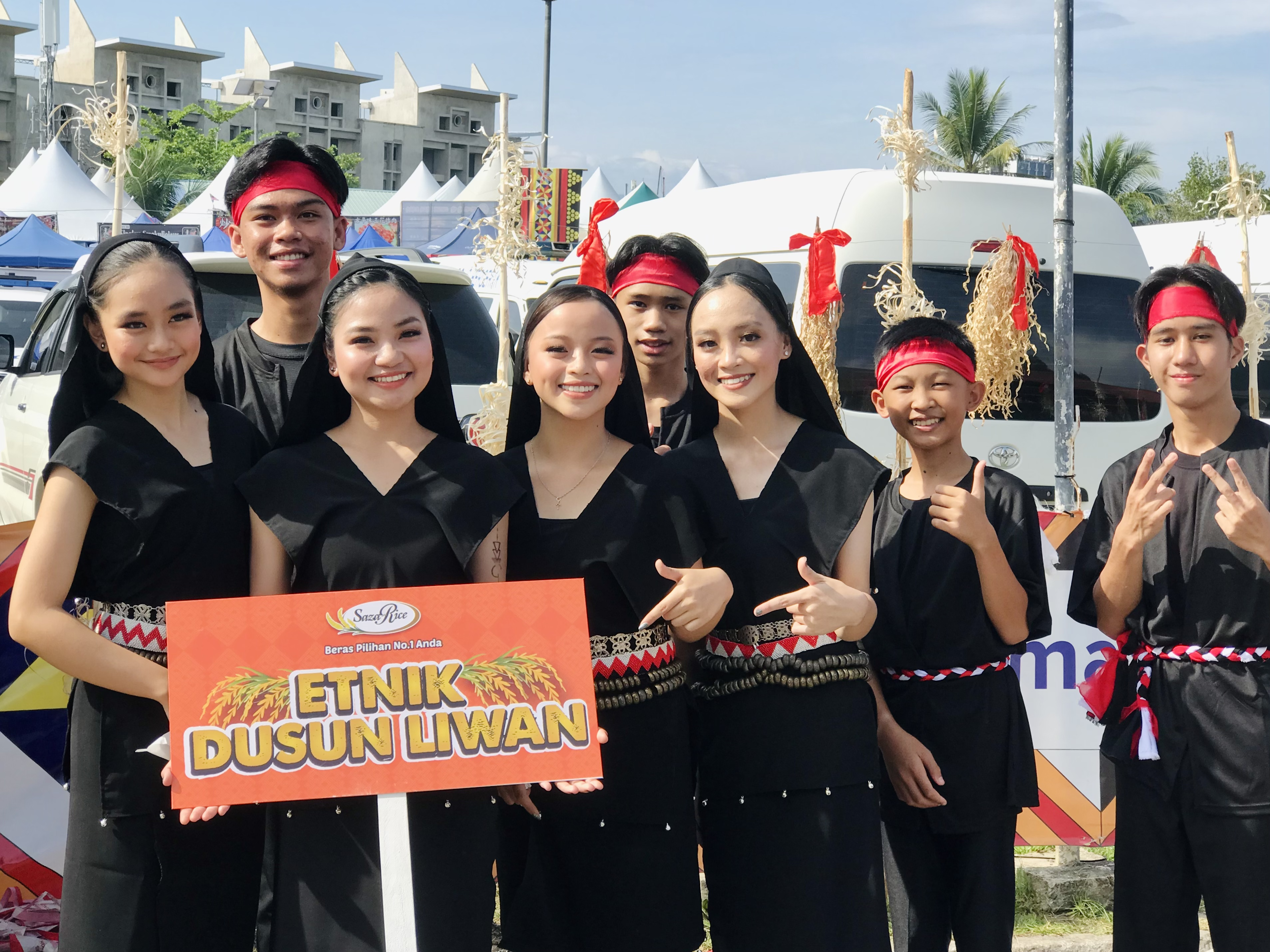
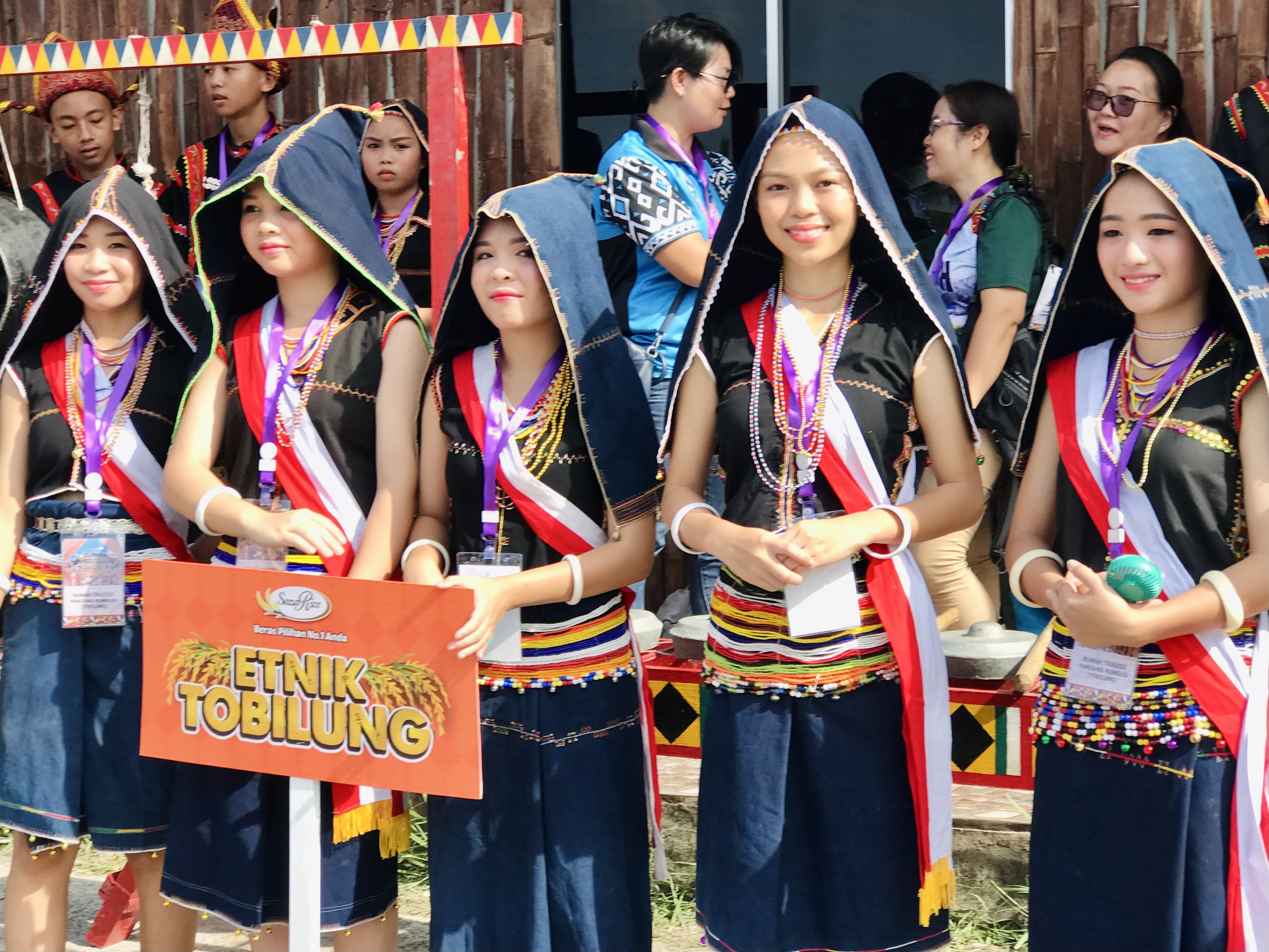
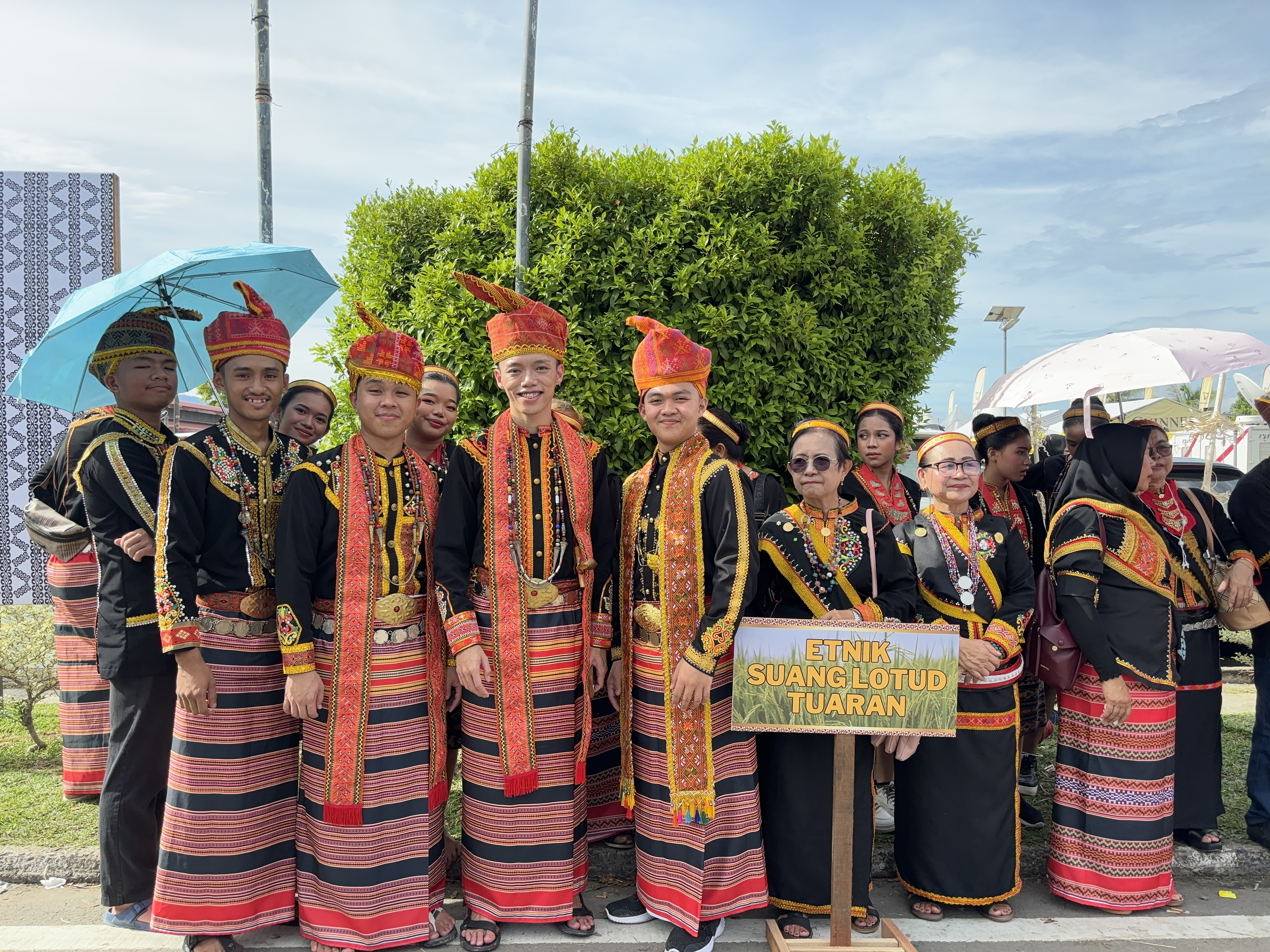
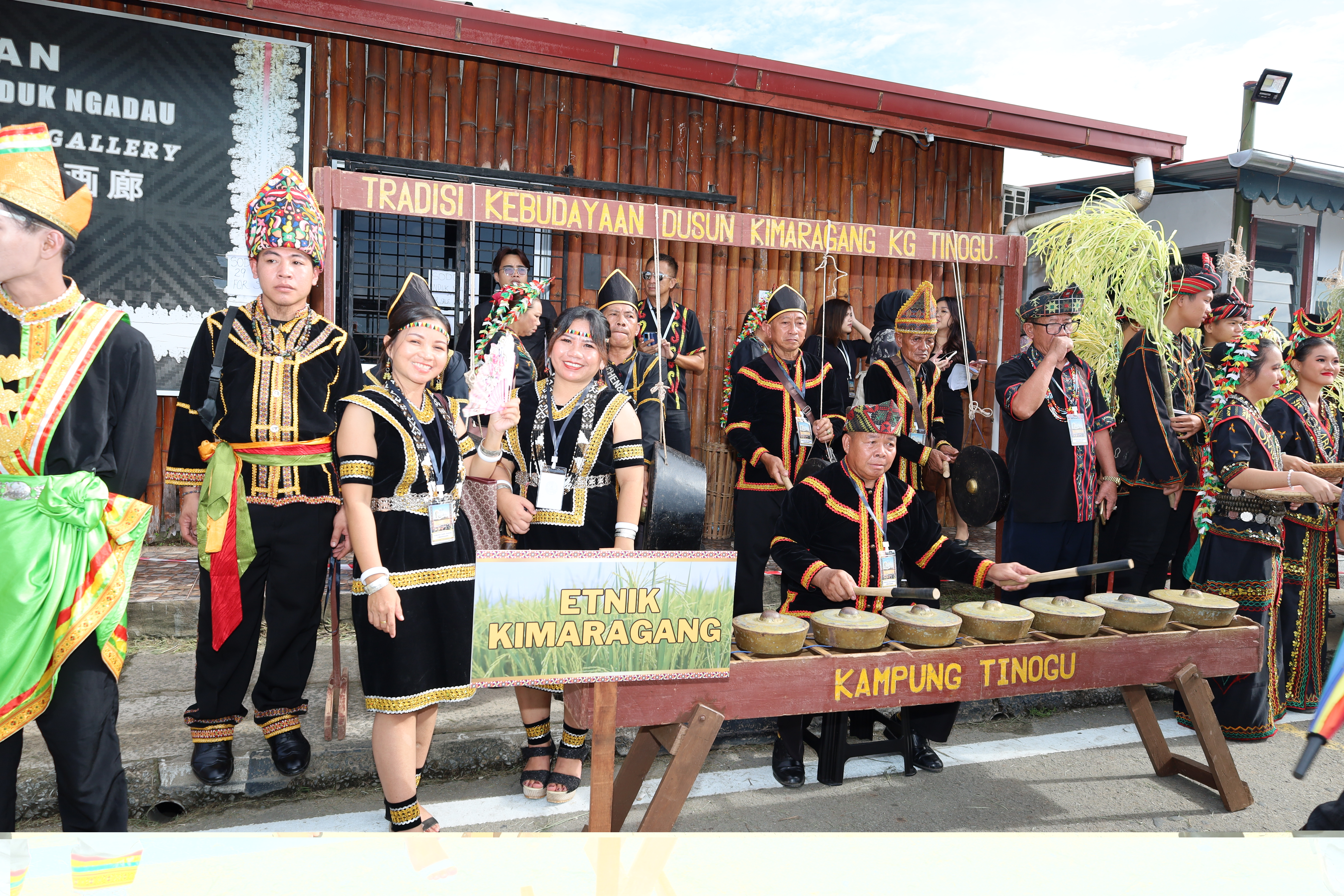
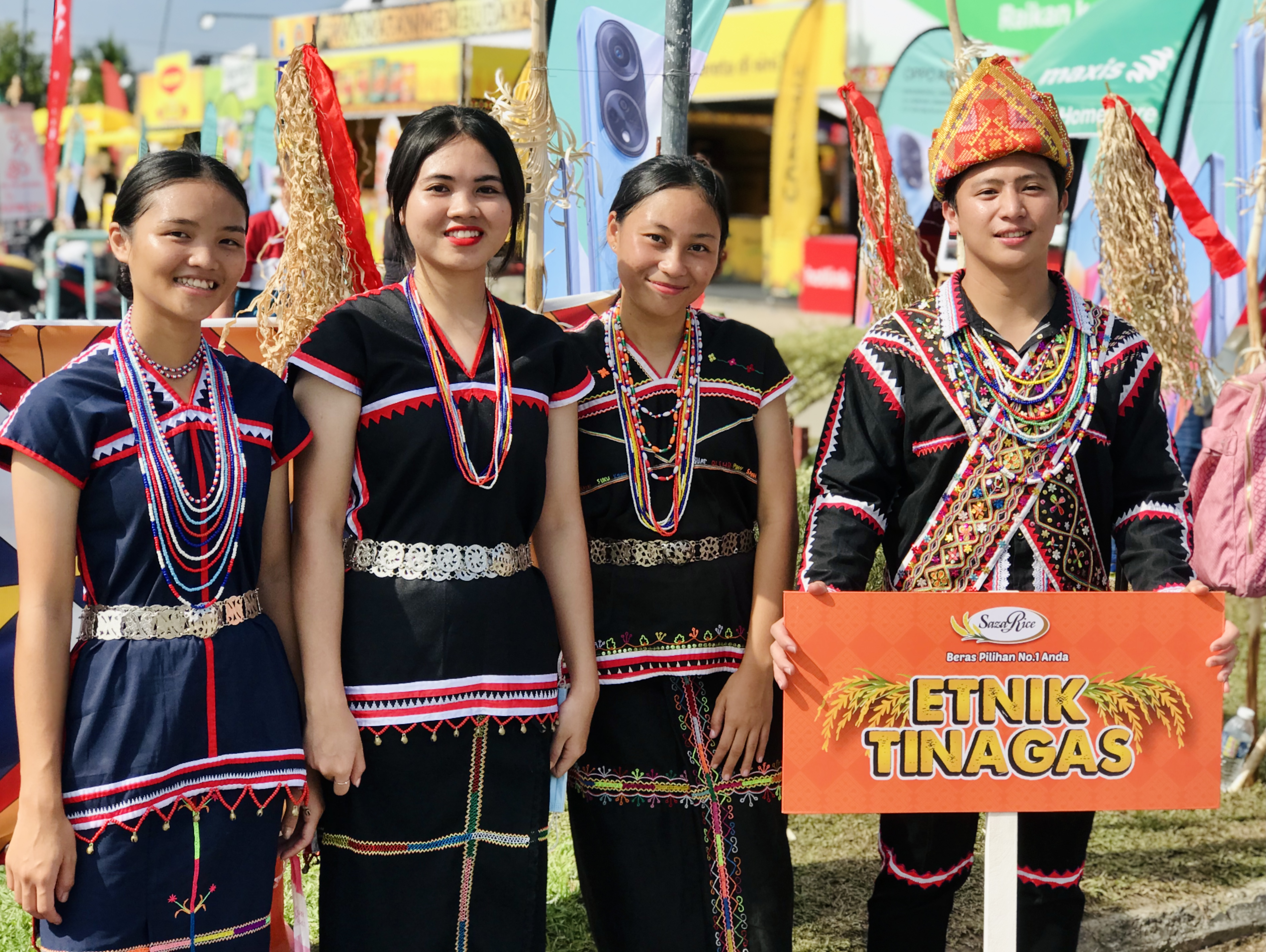
- From clockwise: Sandayo Dusun of Paitan sub-district, Beluran as well as Kota Marudu district, Tindal Dusun of Kota Belud District, Liwan Dusun of Ranau as well as Tambunan districts, Tobilung Dusun of Kota Belud as well as Kota Marudu districts, Kimaragang Dusun of Kota Marudu District, Tinagas Dusun of Beluran, Ranau, Telupid as well as Kota Marudu districts, Lotud Dusun of Tuaran District, and Tatana Dusun of Kuala Penyu and Beaufort districts, all in their respective traditional costumes

Total population
- 38.7% of 51.9% Sabah Bumiputeras (2025) ≈555,647 (2010) (Note: Based on the 2010 Malaysian Population Census, which is the last census categorised into specific ethnic groups, there were a total of 555,647 Kadazan-Dusuns (the census combined the total with Kadazans) in Sabah alone, although the total number of Kadazan-Dusuns in other states of Malaysia was not provided in the census.)

Regions with significant populations
- Malaysia (Sabah, Labuan)

Languages
- Native; Dusun and various other Dusunic languages Also; Sabah Malay • Standard Malay • English

Religion
- Christianity (Catholic, Protestant) (90%), Islam (Sunni) and Animism (Traditional religion (Momolianism)) (10%)

Related ethnic groups
- Dusunic related peoples; (Kadazan; Kwijau; Paitan; Tatana; Lotud; Brunei Dusun; Rungus; Kadazan-Dusun); Dayak • Iban • Melanau • Lun Bawang/Dayeh • Murut • Kedayan • other Austronesian peoples

The Dusun people or simply the Dusuns is the collective name of an Austronesian ethnic group indigenous to Sabah, Malaysia. They primarily live on the West Coast, in the Interior, and in the Sandakan and Tawau divisions, primarily in the districts of Ranau, Tambunan, Kota Kinabalu, Tuaran, Kota Marudu, Kota Belud, Beaufort, Kuala Penyu, Telupid, Keningau, and Beluran (Labuk-Sugut), (Note: With migrant village settlements in the district of Tenom (Pamilaan Village in the Melalap sub-district along its border with Keningau, whereby its Dusun populace originate from Ranau, Tambunan as well as Keningau districts with small minorities from Kota Belud, Tuaran as well as Kota Marudu districts along with their Tenom-born descendants) and Tawau Division especially in Lahad Datu (Tampenau Village, or short form abbreviation of the words Tambunan, Penampang and Ranau in Silam sub-district near to the Danum Valley, whereby a majority of its Dusuns originate from Tambunan as well as Ranau districts in Sabah's interior and northern west coast including Kadazans from Penampang and Papar districts from Sabah's south west coast along with their Lahad Datu-born descendants) and Kunak districts (Kadazan village or Kampung Kadazan) located on the state's interior and east coast respectively.) as well as in the Federal Territory of Labuan.

The Dusuns form the largest collective ethnic group in the region with rich traditional heritage, distinct dress, language and customs based on different sub-groups, with an estimated 555,647 (mixed with the Kadazans) spread across the state, where they further jointly form the larger Kadazan-Dusuns. They have been internationally recognised as an indigenous group in the northern part of the island of Borneo since 2004 by the United Nations Educational, Scientific and Cultural Organization (UNESCO).

Other similarly named, but unrelated groups are also found in neighbouring Brunei and Central Kalimantan, Indonesia. The Dusun in Brunei have distinct traditional beliefs and customs compared to those in Sabah. Bruneian Dusuns share a common origin, language and identity with the Bisaya people of Brunei, northern Sarawak and southwestern Sabah. Despite these differences, both groups are part of the broader Dusunic language family. In Indonesia, the Barito Dusun groups, located throughout the Barito River system, are part of the Ot Danum Dayak people, rather than being related to the Dusuns of northern Borneo.

== Etymology ==
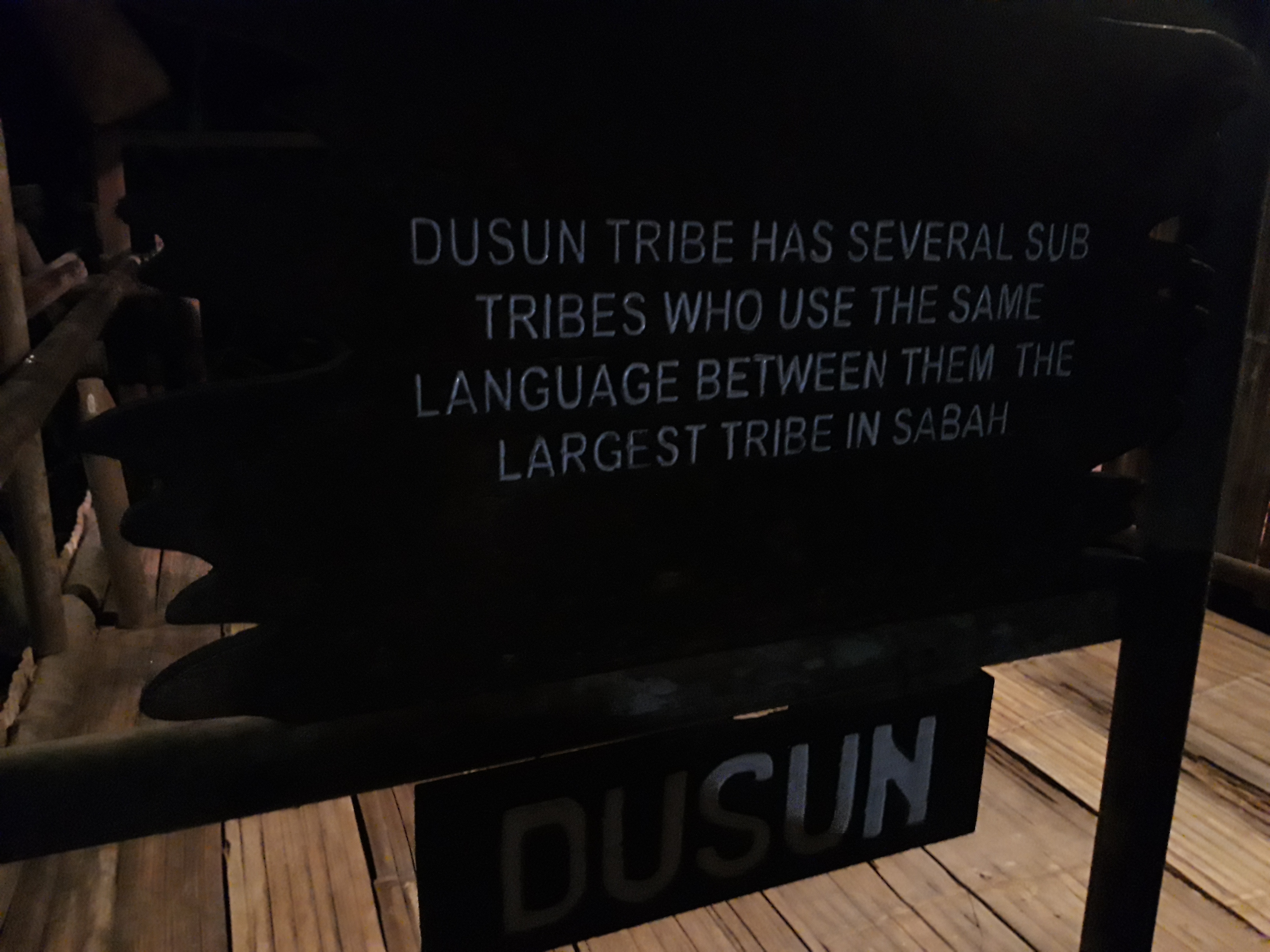
Dusuns tribe sign at the Mari Mari Cultural Village in Inanam, Kota Kinabalu District

The term "Dusun people" (Malay: Orang Dusun), which carries the meaning "people of the orchards", was early coined by Bruneian Malays and Chinese overlords throughout the Sultanate of Brunei administration to refer to the agricultural populations of northern Borneo. Within the vocabulary of Dusunic languages, there is no "Dusun" word, and the indigenous ethnic groups referred to as Dusuns call themselves "tulun tindal" (landsman). Since most of the western coast of the northern part of Borneo was under the influence of Brunei, taxes called (Kadazan Dusun: duis) (also referred to as the 'river tax' in the area southeast of northern Borneo) were collected from the Dusun people. Various descriptions of the Dusuns are available throughout the British surveys and administration, the first by Thomas Forrest in 1774. Another British navigator and explorer once described the Dusuns in 1884:

... peeping curiously in at the open doors and windows were numerous Dusuns, a wild tribe that inhabit the mountains of the northern parts of the island... according to Mr. Brooke, they are agricultural people, having a peculiar dialect of their own ...

— Admiral Edward Belcher, British naval officer, hydrographer, and explorer, 1884

Dusuns' depiction on British North Borneo Crown (present-day Sabah) stamps with a portrait of Queen Elizabeth II, 1964

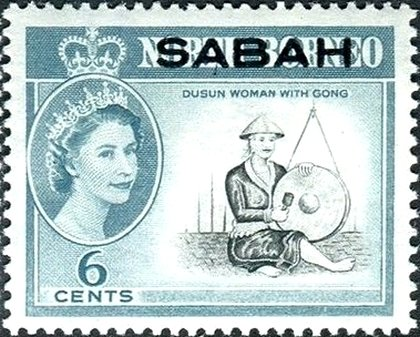
A 6¢ stamp featuring a Dusun woman with a gong

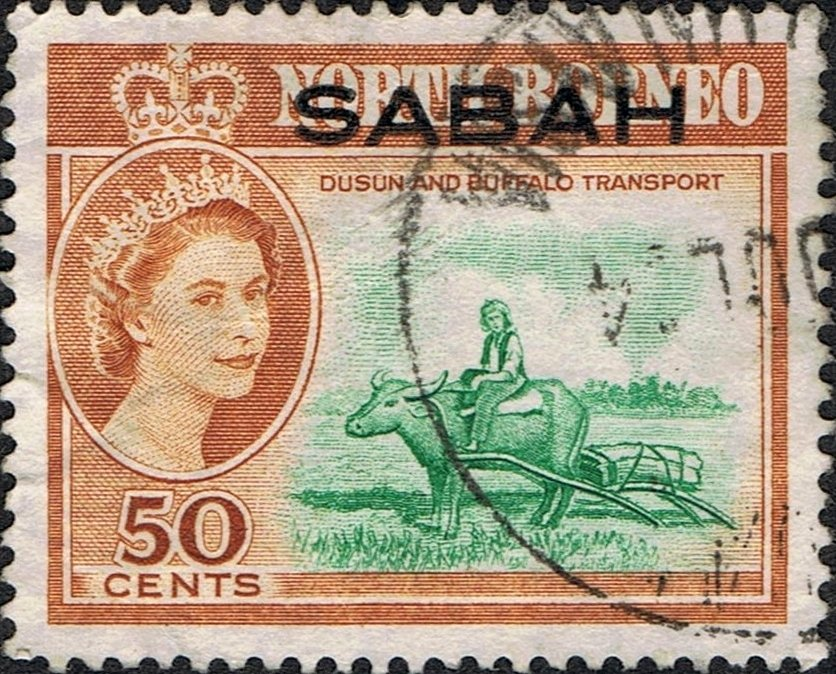
A 50¢ stamp featuring a Dusun man porter with buffalo transport

Following the establishment of the North Borneo Chartered Company (NBCC) and subsequently the state of North Borneo in 1881, the British administration categorised the linguistically similar twelve main and thirty-three sub-tribes collectively as "Dusuns". The Buludupih Sungei and Ida'an, who had converted to Islam early, had preferred to be called "Sungei" and "Ida'an", respectively, although they come from the same sub-tribes.

Ivor Hugh Norman Evans (1886–1957), a British anthropologist, ethnographer, and archaeologist who spent most of his working life in British Malaya and British Borneo, described the Dusuns as not a single tribe but an assemblage of tribes where the term "Orang Dusun" is not the name used by the indigenous to describe themselves; the people of each district or each assemblage of village communities employ a different term, but it is a name meaning "people of the orchards". "Orang" means "people", while "Dusun" carries the meaning of an orchard used by the Bruneian Malays to denote those inhabitants of the greater part of the interior of British North Borneo. Furthermore, a Dusun house is often situated within or surrounded by a variety of fruit trees like bambangan, breadfruit, cempedak, jackfruit, mango and tarap, including calamansi, bird's eye chilli and other Bornean native tree species, reflecting the deep connection to nature and agriculture. The Dusun term was popularised by the British administration as a unifying term among the various North Borneo sub-ethnics, who also borrowed the term from past Brunei administrations. The Rungus people were part of the Dusun sub-ethnic group but formed their own distinction.

Before 1960, most of the sub-ethnics of the Dusuns, including the Tangaah Kadazans, were known as Dusuns. In the population census conducted by the North Borneo authorities until 1960, the term "Dusun" was used to represent all the Dusun tribes and sub-tribes. The term "Kadazan" only began to appear in the population census conducted in Sabah in 1970 after the formation of the Malaysian federation since there had been a dispute over the use of the "Dusun" term among the Tangaah Dusun tribe of the Penampang and Papar districts, who resisted the use of "Dusun" to symbolise their sub-ethnicity due to previous issues throughout the British era, but with reconciliation and recognition of each other, the Dusuns in both districts are identified as Kadazan people. (Note: The "Tangaah Kadazan" of Penampang and Papar is a Kadazan-Dusun tribe who resist the "Dusun term" once coined by early Chinese and Brunei overlords due to a previous dark history related to the "Tagahas Dusun" for betrayals during a conflict by Mat Salleh in Tambunan. Similarly, the Lotud Dusun of Tuaran were also against the term of "Kadazan" to referring the Tangaah of Penampang and Papar until the problem of the "Kadazan" and "Dusun" term were settled with the recognition of each other.) The "Dusun" terms used in present-day Sabah are different than the terms used in neighbouring Sarawak and Brunei. The Dusuns in Sabah name the sub-ethnics of themselves based on place names, river names, or tree names such as Bundu, Gana, Gonsomon, Kimaragang, Kumut, Liwan, and Tuhawon, where these names are also used as identity names and names for their dialects. In Brunei, the term "Dusun" is used to describe non-Muslims living along the Belait and Tutong rivers.

== Background history and origin ==
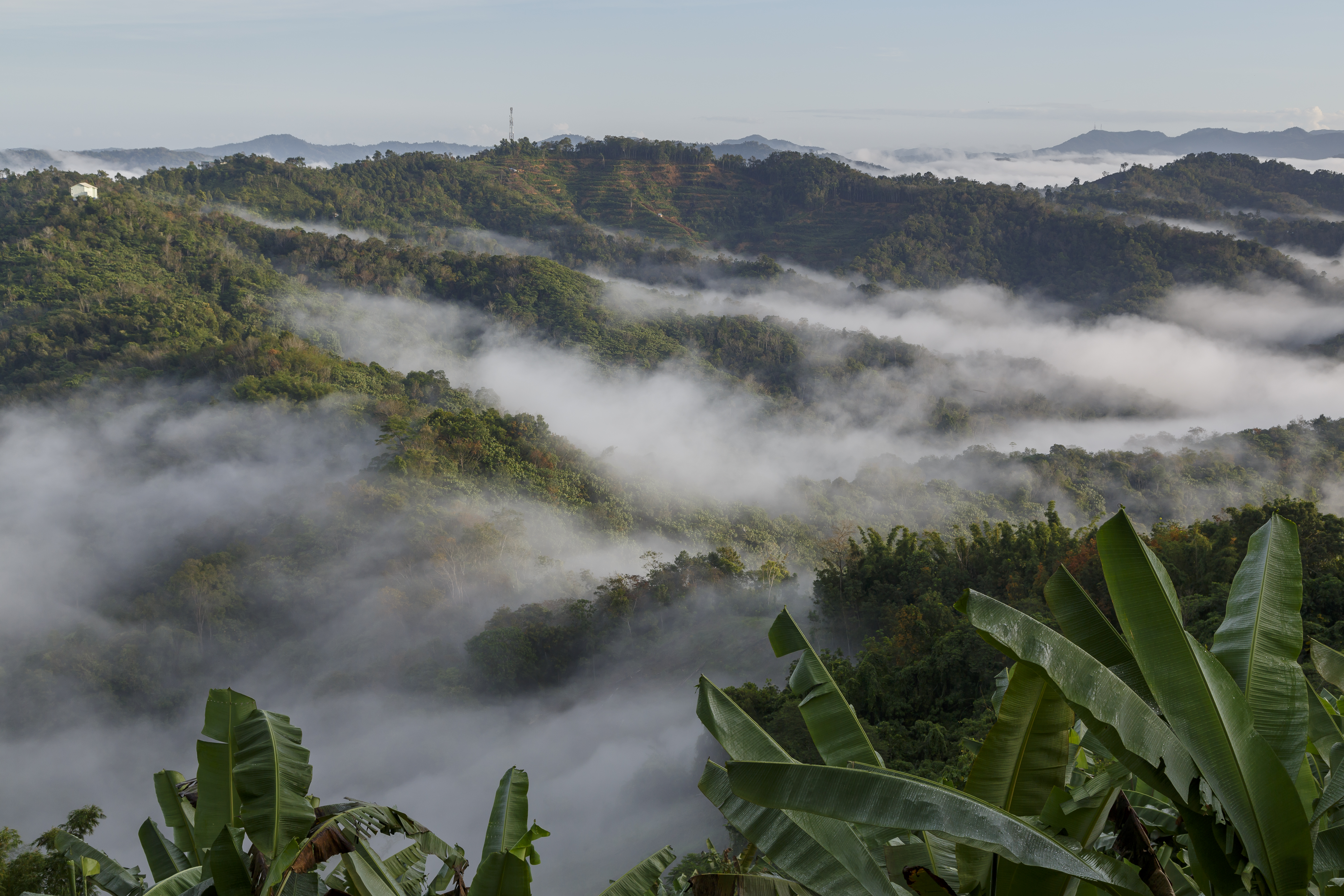
Crocker Mountains in the northwestern part of Borneo, where many Dusuns' homeland is located within the valley and hills of the mountain ranges

There are various theories on the origin of the Dusuns tribe, with several historians associating the tribe with the origin of Mongoloid stock. British Major Colin Metcalfe Dallas Enríquez, through its publication in 1927, associated the Dusuns with Burmese Kachin and Vietnamese indigenous people living in Annam (the Montagnard). He described:

The long communal houses, the method of hill cultivation, the rice wine of Borneo, are all repeated on the Burmese border. Both Dusun and Kachin women wear hoops of lacquered cane around their bodies. The animism of the Dusun, with its spirits of trees and mountains, resembles that of the Kachins. Dusun chiefs are called "Orang Tua"; Kachin Chiefs have the title of "Duwa". Both races have the same sort of character, the same superstitious, the same omen, the same curious belief.

— Major Colin Metcalfe Dallas Enríquez, British Empire author, 1927

The vast majority of Dusuns live in the hills and upland valleys and have a reputation for peacefulness, hospitality, hard work, frugality, drinking and aversion to violence. The Dusuns at one time made up the most important tribe of North Borneo and once made up almost 40% of the region ethnic groups; divided into more than 30 sub-ethnic groups, or dialect groups, or tribes, each speaking a slightly different dialect of the Dusunic and Paitanic family languages, although they are mostly mutually understandable among each other. The classification of northern Borneo indigenous people who lived in the geographical zone between the coast and mountainous interior as Dusuns was maintained as the basis for administrative purposes.

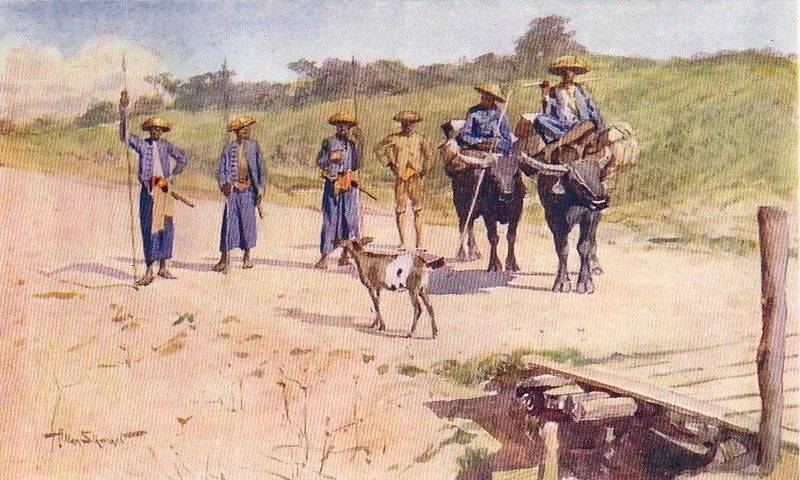
Dusun traders as illustrated by Allan Stewart in British North Borneo by L. W. W. Gudgeon

The arrival of Christian missionaries in the 1880s brought to the Dusuns and Dayaks of Borneo the ability to read, write and converse in the English language. The missionaries were aware that their knowledge in Dusunic languages was also a key factor in the propagation of Christianity among the indigenous. With improved literacy and religious education, this subsequently stimulated the indigenous to get involved in community development, with the first Dusun tribes who were first exposed to this modernisation being the Tangaa or Tangara (present-day Kadazans), who dwelt between the Papar, Membakut, Putatan and Penampang coastal plains close to British administration areas. The first attempt among the Dusun tribes to translate the Bible was by the Tangaah Dusun followed with the creation of "Tangaa Dusun Dictionary", also referred to as the "z" dialect where the Tangaah are presently known as the Kadazan ethnic group. Throughout the British administration, most Dusuns have converted to mainstream religions such as Christianity (both Roman Catholic and Protestant) and some to Sunni Islam, although animism is still being practised by a minority of Dusuns.

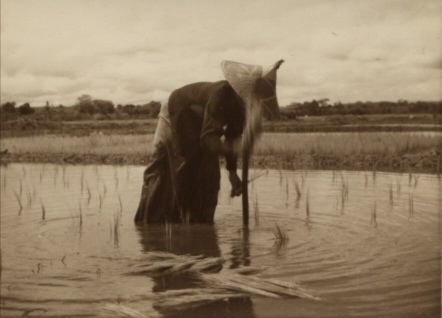
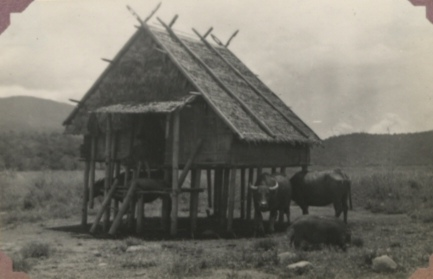
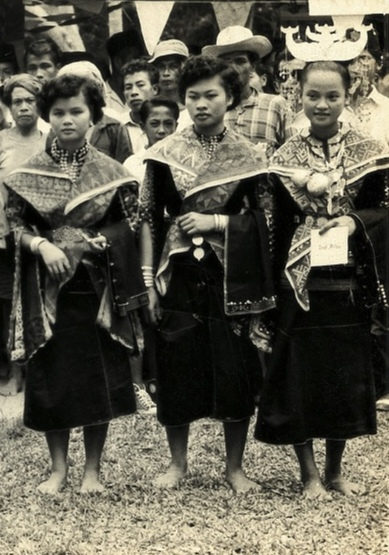
(Top) A Dusun female paddy planter in Binaong Village, Keningau District, Crown Colony of North Borneo, c. 1950–1960
(Centre) A Dusun house with carabao (water buffalo) at the Ranau Plains, Ranau District, British North Borneo, c. 1900–1920s
(Bottom) Three Tindal Dusuns women in their traditional dress in Sandakan District, British North Borneo, c. 1900–1920s. One Dusun woman can be seen with Bajau headdress in the far right

The Dusuns used to trade with the coastal people by bringing their agricultural and forest produce such as rice and amber "damar" (dipterocarpaceae) to exchange for salt, salted fish and other products. The Dusuns have a special term to describe this type of trading activity, which they call "mongimbadi" (going to market). Before the establishment of railroad and road networks connecting the interior with the coastal regions of Sabah, the area within the present Tambunan-Penampang road was the trading route used by the Bundu-Liwan Dusuns to cross the Crocker Range, where the present road was largely constructed based on the original trading route used by the Dusuns on their "mongimbadi". In their traditional occupation as North Borneo agricultural ethnic groups and chief-rice producers, they use various methods of farming and fishing, including using the juice called "tuba" derived from the roots of the "surinit" plant to momentarily stun fish in rivers.

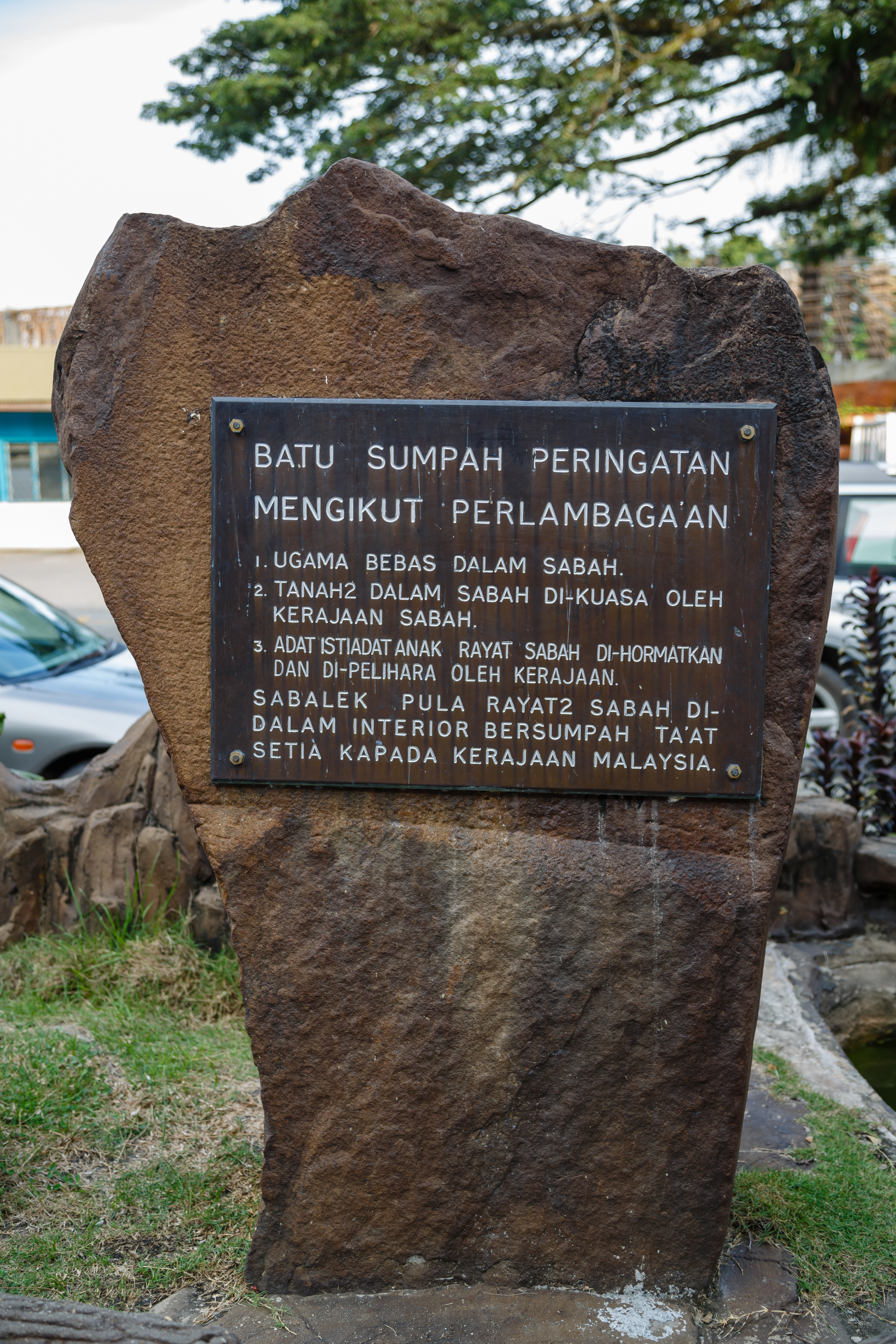
The Oath Stone in interior Sabah of Keningau District, an oath from the indigenous Dusuns and Muruts with the federal government of Malaysia following the Malaysia Agreement for the latter to respect traditional values of the indigenous and guarantee their freedom of religion, which in return the indigenous population will be loyal to the federal government. The stone was the idea of adviser of the United Sabah Dusun Association (USDA), Samson Sundang Gunsanad

The Dusuns are represented through their respective sub-ethnic associations, which are further jointly united through the primary Dusun ethnic association. Prior to the formation of the federation of Malaysia, the Dusuns together with the Muruts stipulated various condition through the 20-point agreement for the North Borneo Crown to be part of the federation, constitute several terms from the indigenous Dusuns and Muruts for the federal government to guaranteed their rights within the federation for them to continuously living in peaceful and their rights be respected and honoured by the federal government by maintaining freedom of religion with no state religion for North Borneo, all lands in the territory should be under the North Borneo government, and the federal need to regard and respecting traditional indigenous values, to ensure continuous peace and loyalty from the indigenous community.

Following the formation of the Malaysian federation, the Dusuns started to be represented through the United Sabah Dusun Association (USDA) in 1967. The USDA was later jointly merged with the Kadazan Cultural Association (KCA) to form the Kadazan Dusun Cultural Association (KDCA) in 1989 with headquarters at the KDCA Compound of Penampang District. In present days, most of the younger Dusun generation are modernised and well-integrated into the larger framework of Malaysian society, taking up various occupations as government servants and employees in the private sector, with some also becoming business owners. Many have completed tertiary education both locally and overseas, with many Dusuns also pursuing their studies at Western countries' tertiary educational institutes. With increasing modernisation and globalisation, the modern Dusun community also struggles to keep the traditional values of their community, such as the customs, taboos and languages, since many of the modern Dusun generations, comfortable living a modern life with modern technologies, have become increasingly unaware of their ethnic identities. In pursuing the indigenous languages of the Dusuns to remain in place like the major community languages of West Malaysia within the federation, the indigenous community also faced tension with Malay ethno-nationalism, which has the central place in Malaysia's state nationalist project.

=== Folk beliefs ===
The Dusuns have an oral history passed down through generations that their origin is tied to the legendary site of Nunuk Ragang, a giant red banyan tree where their ancestors are said to have first settled in what is northern Borneo. Based on the beliefs of the original traditional Animist-Pagan religion of the Dusuns known as Momolianism, as mentioned under the Kadazan-Dusun Genesis, the origin of the Kadazan-Dusun through the Nunuk Ragang was firstly through Kinoingan and Suminundu, the creators who also have a daughter named Huminodun, which later became the roots of the annual harvest festival celebration of Kaamatan celebrated by both the Dusuns and Kadazans.

=== Genetic studies ===
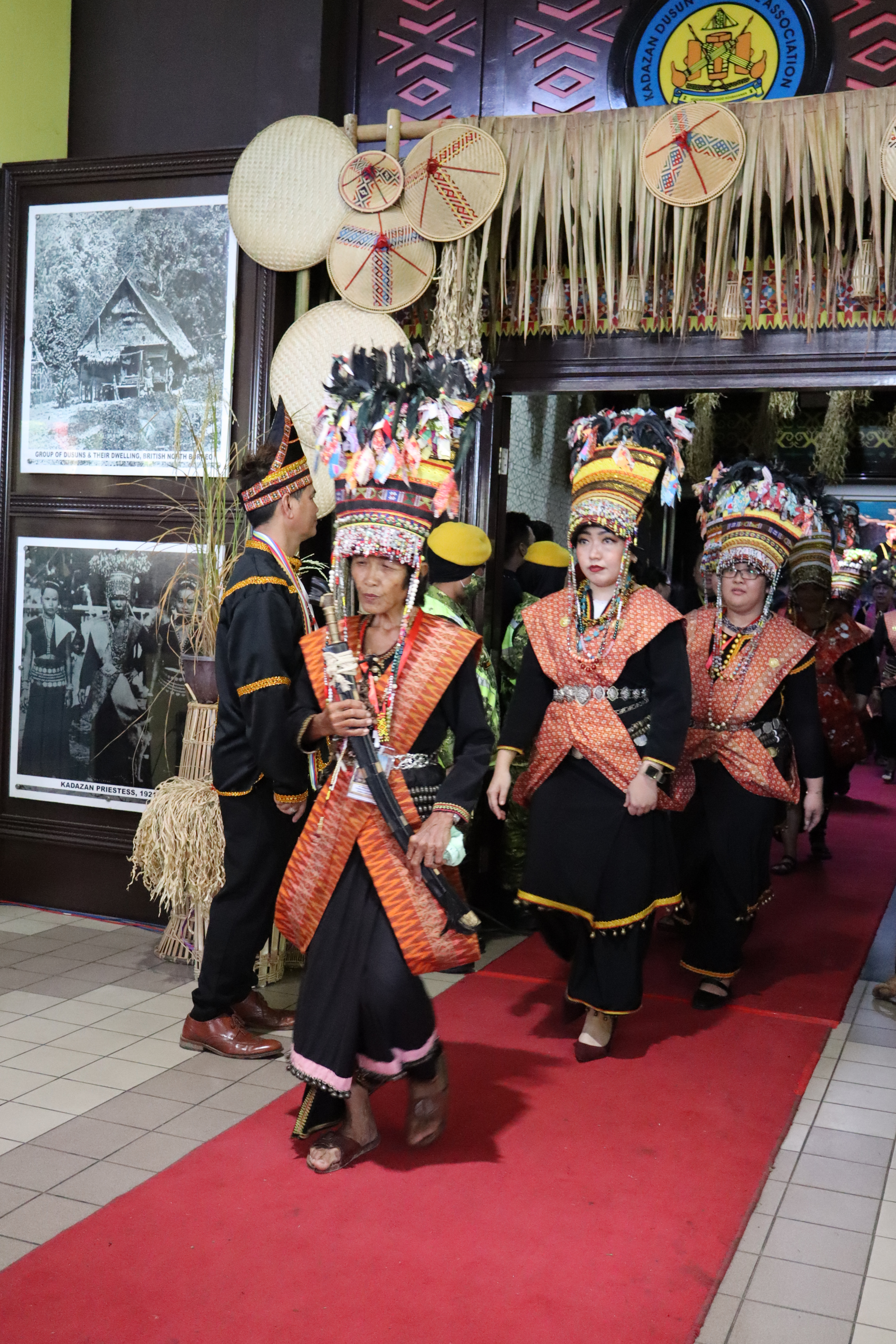
Dusun female shaman, the bobolians during Kaamatan

According to a Genome-wide single-nucleotide polymorphism (SNP) genotypic data studies by human genetics research team from University of Malaysia Sabah in 2018, the northern Bornean Dusun (comprising the Sonsogon, Rungus, Lingkabau and Murut) are closely related to Taiwan natives (the Amis and Atayal) and non–Austro-Melanesian Filipinos (the Visayans, Tagalog, Ilocano, and Manobo), rather than populations from other parts of Borneo. Further, in 2021, the Dusuns have been equated with one of the indigenous tribes in Formosa (present-day Taiwan), the Bunun, who have more similarities to the Dusuns than other tribes of Taiwan. Based on studies, the latter deoxyribonucleic acid (DNA), culture, and beliefs are the most identical, especially in the worship of paddy spirit and the presence of their own female shamans.

== Dusun sub-ethnic groups by districts ==
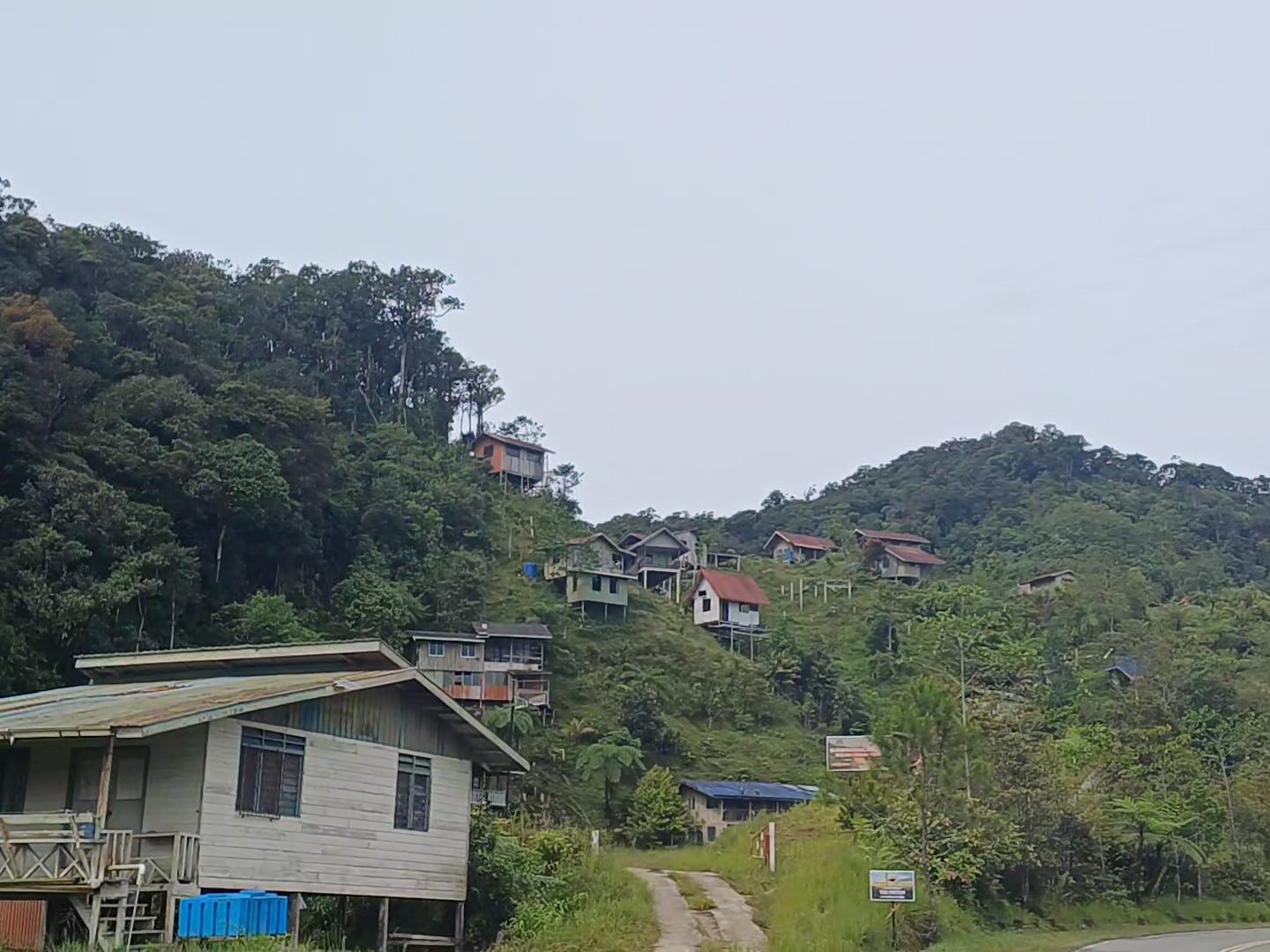
A Dusun hamlet along the Keningau-Kimanis Road known as Minamasok village, Keningau along its border with Papar district, on the boundary of the south West Coast and upper Interior divisions of Sabah, in which a group of traditional houses built were surrounded by hills

The Dusun tribe comprised different sub-ethnics which were classified by the British North Borneo Chartered Company (NBCC) administration in the 1800s and maintained to this day for administrative purposes. During the administration of the NBCC, both the Dusun and Murut are the predominating indigenous tribes of British North Borneo. Throughout the administration, however, the British protectorate government at the time was unable to correctly ascertain the ethnic groups that were categorised as Dusun and Kadazan, despite each indigenous person being recorded and categorised into the British North Borneo indigenous categories such as Dumpas, Idahan, Liwan, Lotud, Mangkahak, Maragang, Minokok, Murut, Paitan, Rumanau, Rungus, Tombonuo, Tanggara, Tindal, Tagahas, and Tingaras. The difficulty in understanding ethnic diversity among the indigenous population was caused by the inconsistency of ethnic classification in the NBCC administration's census. Several errors have occurred in the process of classifying the indigenous ethnic population throughout British administration since 1901, mostly due to the frequent changing of the demarcation of North Borneo provinces. Different Dusun sub-tribes lived throughout different districts of Sabah, where they lived in groups in an area according to their respective groups. Within the federation of Malaysia, the Dusuns are considered as one of Sabah Bumiputeras. Among the well-known Dusun sub-ethnics are the Gana, Kimaragang, Kujau, Liwan, Lotud, Tagahas, Tatana, Tindal, Tobilung and many others.

=== Beluran Dusun ===
In the Beluran District of Sandakan Division, the main Dusun sub-ethnic group is the Labuk Dusun, whose name originated from the Labuk River, while the name of Beluran District itself is taken from the Labuk Dusun word "Buludan". Their main village is within the Kuala Sapi Village. The sub-ethnic originally constituting groups of "bansa sabanar" such as Dalamason, Putih, Sogilitan, Tindakon, Tompulung, and Turavid in the lower Labuk River. There were approximately 6,449 Labuk Dusun within the district in 1998, where they practised shifting dry paddy cultivation and beliefs in Momolianism, including oral traditions such as kurilang, mansuak, mogindong, runsai and tangon.

=== Keningau Dusuns ===
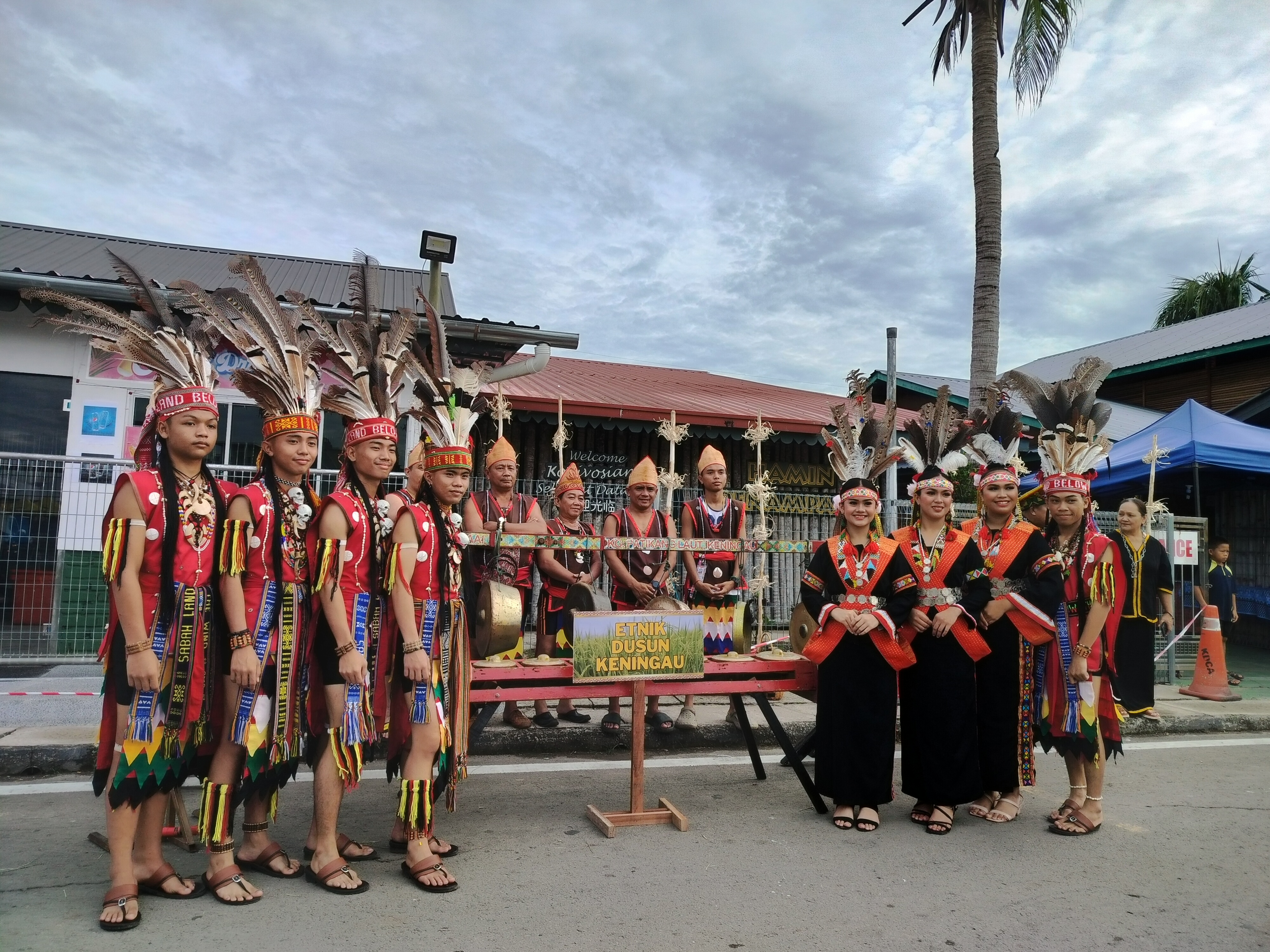
The "Keningau Dusuns" sub-group term, are further divided into several more sub-groups of the Dusuns such as the Gana, Kujau (Kwijau), and Minokok

The Dusun sub-ethnics in Keningau District of Interior Division can be divided into several sub-groups, such as the Gana Dusun and Kujau Dusun (Kwijau), of which both traced their origin from the Nunuk Ragang. Both the Gana and Kujau are closely related to Dusuns, while another group in Keningau, the Nabaai are related to the Murut people. All three sub-groups were the original indigenous inhabitants of the Keningau District. The Gana Dusun were known by their previous name of Talinting Dusun since the tribe often hammered the canang instrument in times of emergency, with the talinting carrying the meaning of "emergency signal" sound produced by the canangs. When the British protectorate government conducted a census within the area, the Talinting people were given the name "Gana" by the British since they inhabited a flat land area which was called gana-gana in the local Dusun language. The Gana Dusuns lived within the villages of Baru, Kuangoh, Minansut, Liposu, Naidat and Tangkungon which are all located next to the sub-district or small township of Bingkor across the Tambunan-Keningau highway (or the Kota Kinabalu-Tenom) road. The Kujau Dusun are mostly concentrated on the highlands of Keningau within the Crocker Range on the western hills, above the Keningau Plains, from the villages of Ansip, Apin-Apin, Bunsit, Liawan, Linsosod, Pamalan as well as Tutumulud, once also fearlessly known for their ngayau (headhunting) practices. The Kujau Dusun were originally the Manindal Dusun tribe who lived on the hills of Keningau by growing rice, and they began to be called "Kuyou" (withered) in the local Dusun language due to a drought that happened around 1879. The local Bruneian Malays called them Kujau, while the British spelt "Kuyou" as Kwijau. Based on old folklore, when the Kujau tribe descended to the Bingkor valley, they were helped by the Gana people, who provided them with rice so the Kujau could obtain their own rice. The two tribes often helped each other in times of disaster or any difficulties, which brought about a bond of friendship. Another Dusun sub-ethnic group originating from the Tongod area in Sandakan Division of Sabah's east coast is the Minokok Dusun, with settlements around the villages of Batu Lunguyan, Kabatang Baru, Kipaliu, Mandagat and Sinaron, also in the Sook sub-district of Keningau. Many of the Minokok Dusun practise upland rice cultivation practices with four traditional upland rice varieties locally known as Kembulaung, Lantai, Sepulut, and Tesik.

=== Kota Belud Dusuns ===
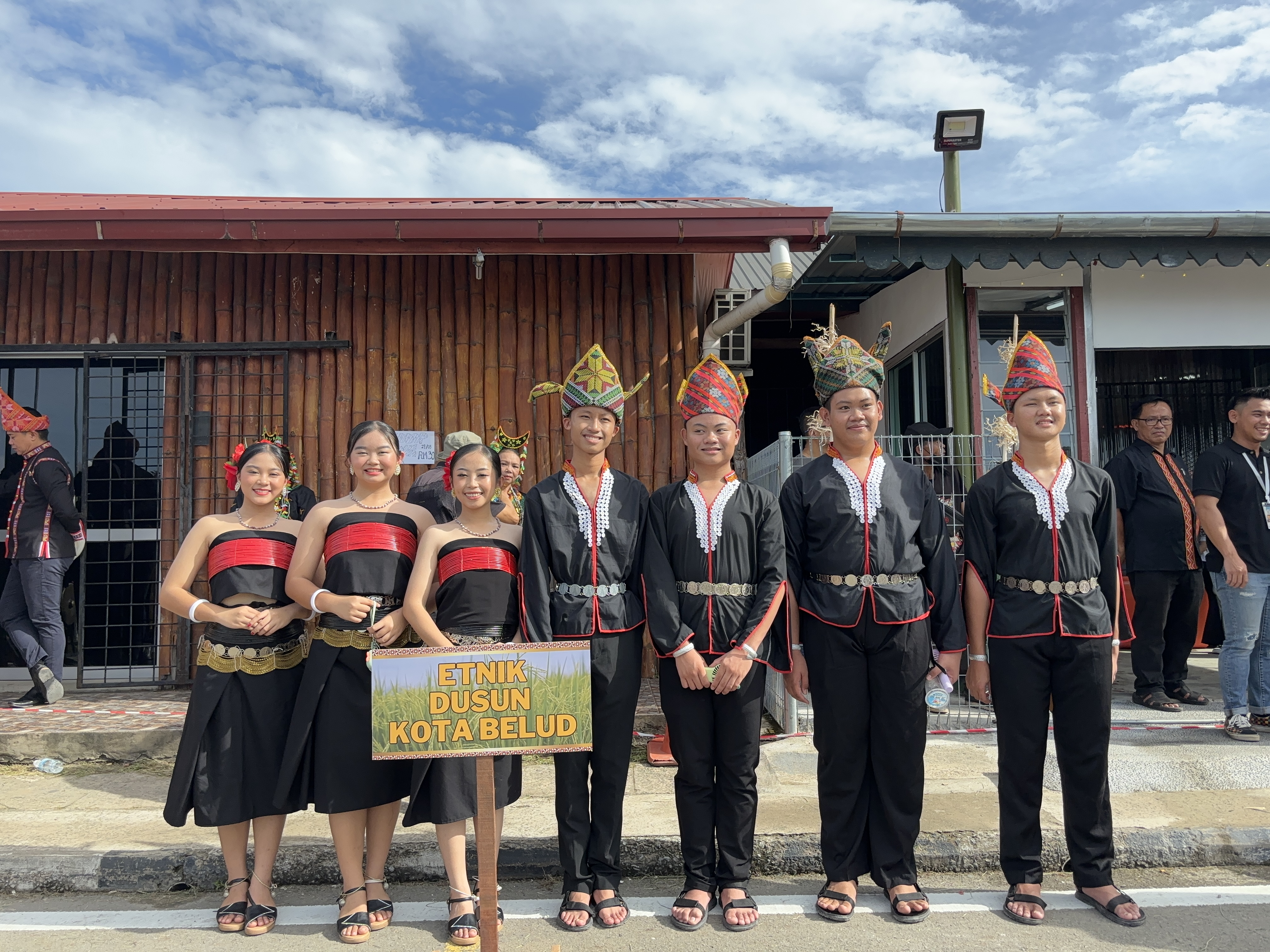
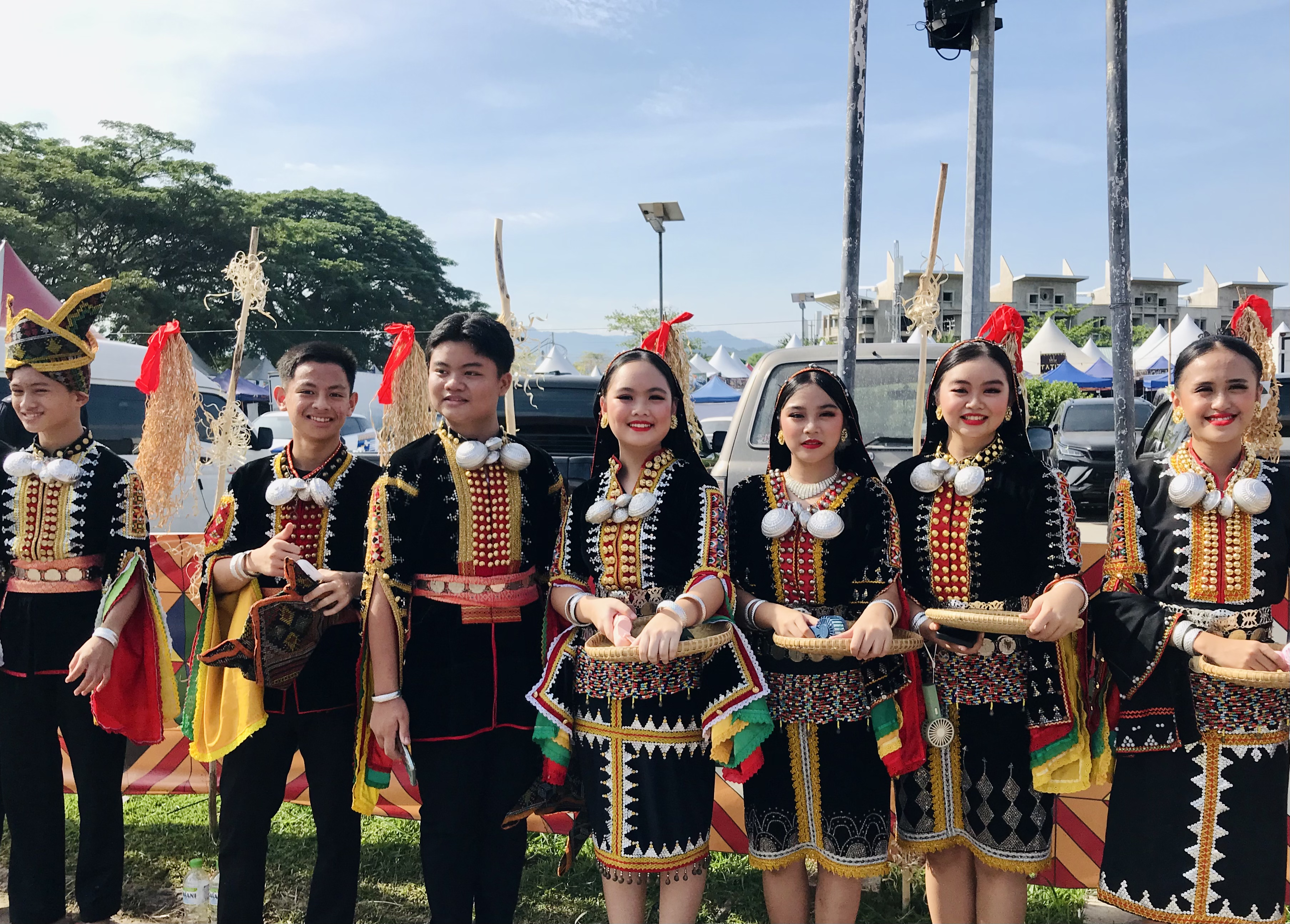
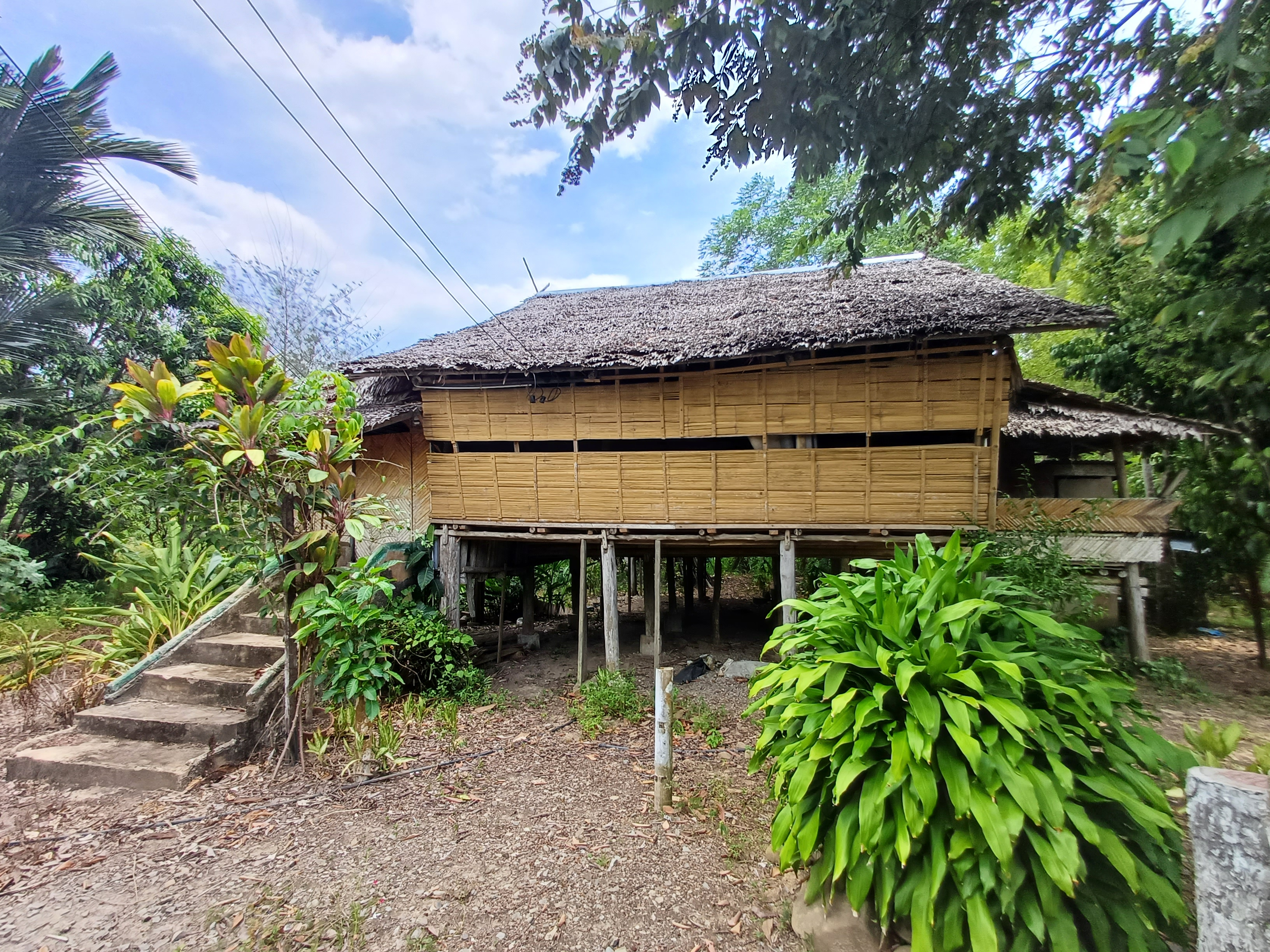
From top to bottom: Kota Belud Dusun, Tindal Dusun of Kota Belud District, and a typical traditional house of the Tobilung Dusuns

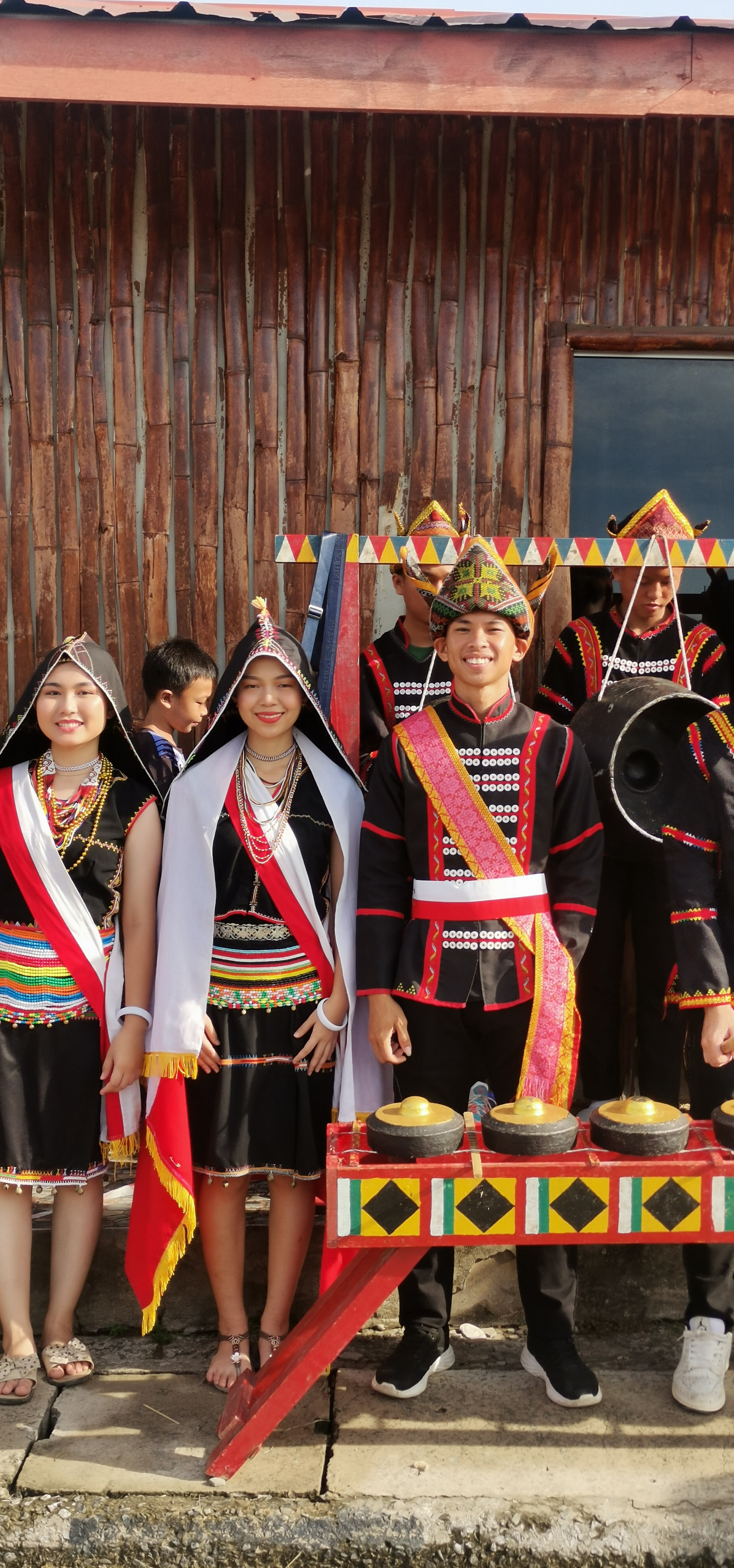
The Tobilung Dusun of Kota Belud District with a sunduk (veil) for its female dress

In this district located in the northern part of Sabah's West Coast Division, there are two Dusun sub-tribes that are native to this district, namely the Tindal who are of Central Dusunic stock and also Tobilung, who are interrelated ethno-linguistically to the Rungus ethnic group as well as the Kimaragang, Garo, Sonsogon and Sandayo tribes in neighbouring Kota Marudu district in Sabah's northern Kudat Division. The Tindal Dusun dominates the Kota Belud district as its main settlement as the largest Dusun sub-ethnic with around 38,097 Tindals scattered across the district. Tindal Dusun community strongly adheres to traditional practices and beliefs of old customs they inherited from their ancestors, with each custom and belief practised being closely related to human life, the environment and cosmology. Traditional customs and beliefs are practised and well maintained by custom practitioners and village heads, with the latter playing a role in continuing traditional practices such as in wedding ceremonies and in the laws of sogit (tribe punishment). Most of the younger generation of Tindal Dusun today have embraced both Christianity (mostly Sidang Injil Borneo and Seventh-day Adventism with Anglican, Catholic, True Jesus Church as well as Lutheran/Basel minorities) and Islam (especially to those who intermarry Muslim Ranau Dusuns who settled in the border areas within the Ranau-Kota Belud highway as well as Muslim-majority ethnic groups such as the Bajaus and Iranuns).

The Tobilung Dusun is another main Dusun sub-group in Kota Belud and has its own belief system and practices, but today this tribe are mostly Christians belonging to the Protestant Church in Sabah, Sidang Injil Borneo and Seventh-day Adventist denominations (with Anglican as well as Catholic minorities). In ancient times, the Tobilung Dusun adhered to animism practices inherited from their ancestors with worldview and belief system of the Tobilung is greatly influenced by the environment and rineet, tinumaru is considered a God by the Tobilung sub-tribe as the protector of their tribe from evil forces where it live in another realm known as lingkogung, which is in the seventh heaven. The Tobilung Dusun practices the spirit of mitatabang (mutual cooperation) when doing work, especially when it comes to clearing fields for rice cultivation, such as rumilik (cutting down forests), mangasok (cutting down), gumamas (weeding), mongomot (harvesting), mongogik (threshing rice) and mirangkat (transporting). The practice of mitatabang is also practised when preparing for weddings, building houses and in the event of a family loss.

=== Kota Marudu Dusuns ===
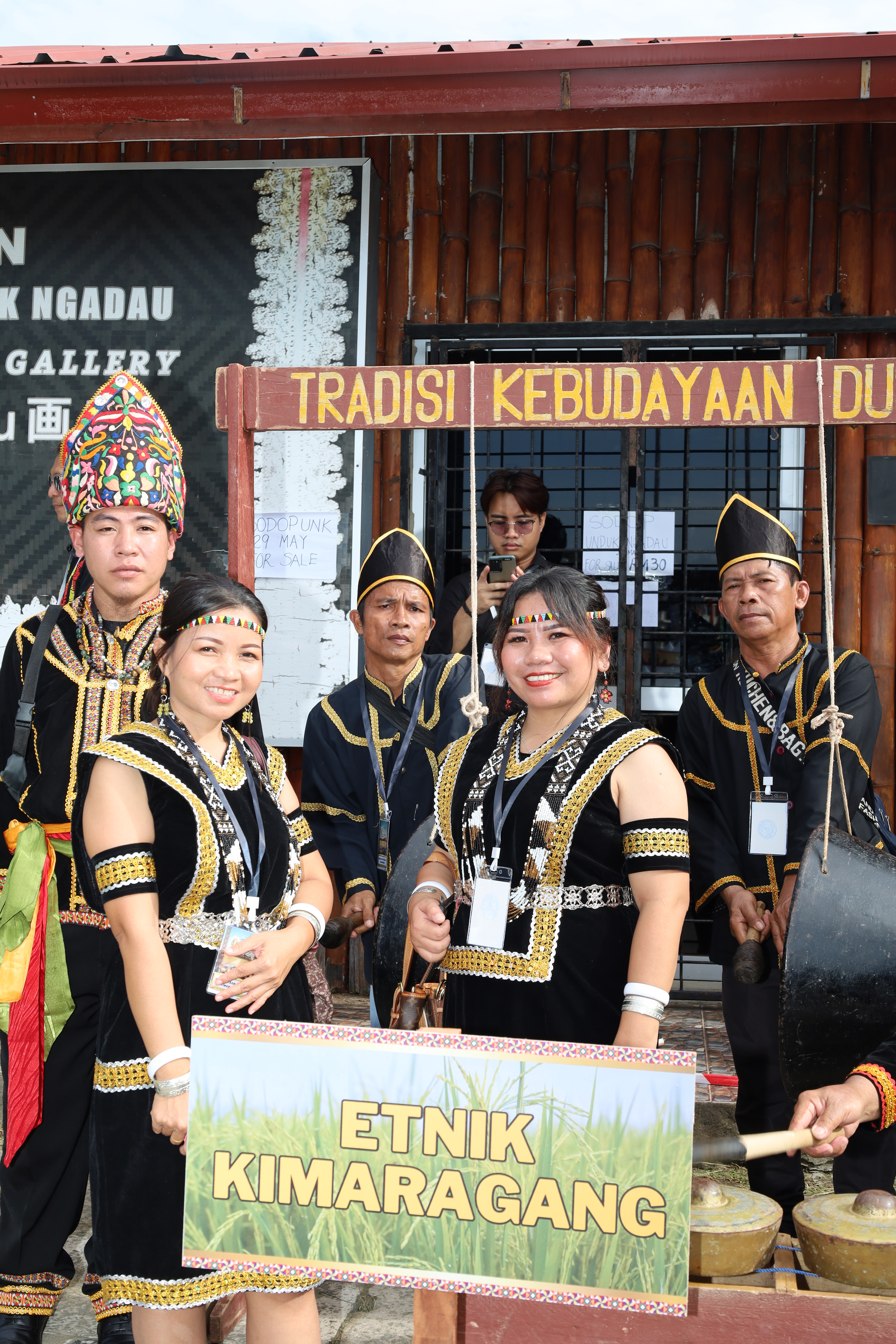
Kimaragang Dusun of Kota Marudu District

The main Dusun sub-ethnic group in Kota Marudu District is the Kimaragang Dusun (with numerous other tribes or sub-tribes such as Sonsogon, Garo, Tobilung and Sandayo), which is also one of the largest and oldest sub-ethnic groups within the Dusun group. Numbered around 120,000 in 2023, the Kimaragang community were divided into two main groups, namely those who inhabit the Kota Marudu-Tandek area and the Pitas-Koromoko area. They reside within Marudu Bay in villages such as Damai, Mosolog, Samparita, Salimandut, Tanjung Batu, Taritapan, Tingkalanon, Tondig, Tinogu and Ulu Bengkoka, neighbouring Pitas in Dandun, Konibungan, Korumoko, Marasinsim and Salimpodon villages as well as the Malobang peninsula, working in agricultural, fisheries and animal husbandry activities, while there are also those who work as civil servants, in the private sector and in personal businesses. The Kimaragang Dusun community also practised the mitatabang activities, such as in weddings, work, celebrations, crowds, and things that are difficult to do alone.

Belief-wise, most Kota Marudu Dusuns were formerly animist or practised Momolianism just like other Kadazan-Dusun tribes, but today are now mostly Christians (particularly Seventh-day Adventist, for this district has a majority adherence to the said church or Christian denomination with significant minorities belonging to other denominations such as Sidang Injil Borneo (SIB), Roman Catholicism, Protestant Church in Sabah and so on) with a small number professing Islam owing to intermarriages with predominantly Muslim Ranau Dusuns (lncluding those who immigrated from neighbouring Ranau district as well as settled ones) particularly in the border villages of Gana, Garung, Kias, Lombiding, Mantub, Marak-Parak, Miniran, Monggis/Manggis, Mulut-Pulut, Poddi, Tandawahon, Serinsim, Surun-Surun, Talantang and Toguhu, as well as Muslim-majority ethnic groups such as Bajaus and Orang Sungei.

The Gobukon Dusun sub-ethnic, which is ethno-linguistically related to other Central Dusunic tribes such as the Bundu-Liwan, Tagahas, Talantang, Tinagas and Tindal in districts such as Ranau, Tambunan, Keningau, Telupid, Beluran as well as Kota Belud including the city of Kota Kinabalu (in areas such as Manggatal, Inanam and Telipok) as well as fellow neighbouring tribes of Central Dusunic stock such as Lingkabau and Luba native to this district, is also among the Dusun tribes with the smallest population in Sabah overall particularly in this district, mostly resides in Pinatau village. The word Gobuk in the Dusun language carries the meaning of a monkey; the Gobukon Dusun revered the primate as their deity in accordance with their own interpretation of their Momolianist animistic beliefs. Another Dusun tribe that is found in Kota Marudu originating from the Central Dusunic group albeit little-known is the Lingkabau Dusun, which is in turn a sub-tribe of the Tinagas group or tribe inhabiting the Sugut River delta on its border with the Beluran District in neighbouring Sandakan division.

=== Kuala Penyu Dusun ===
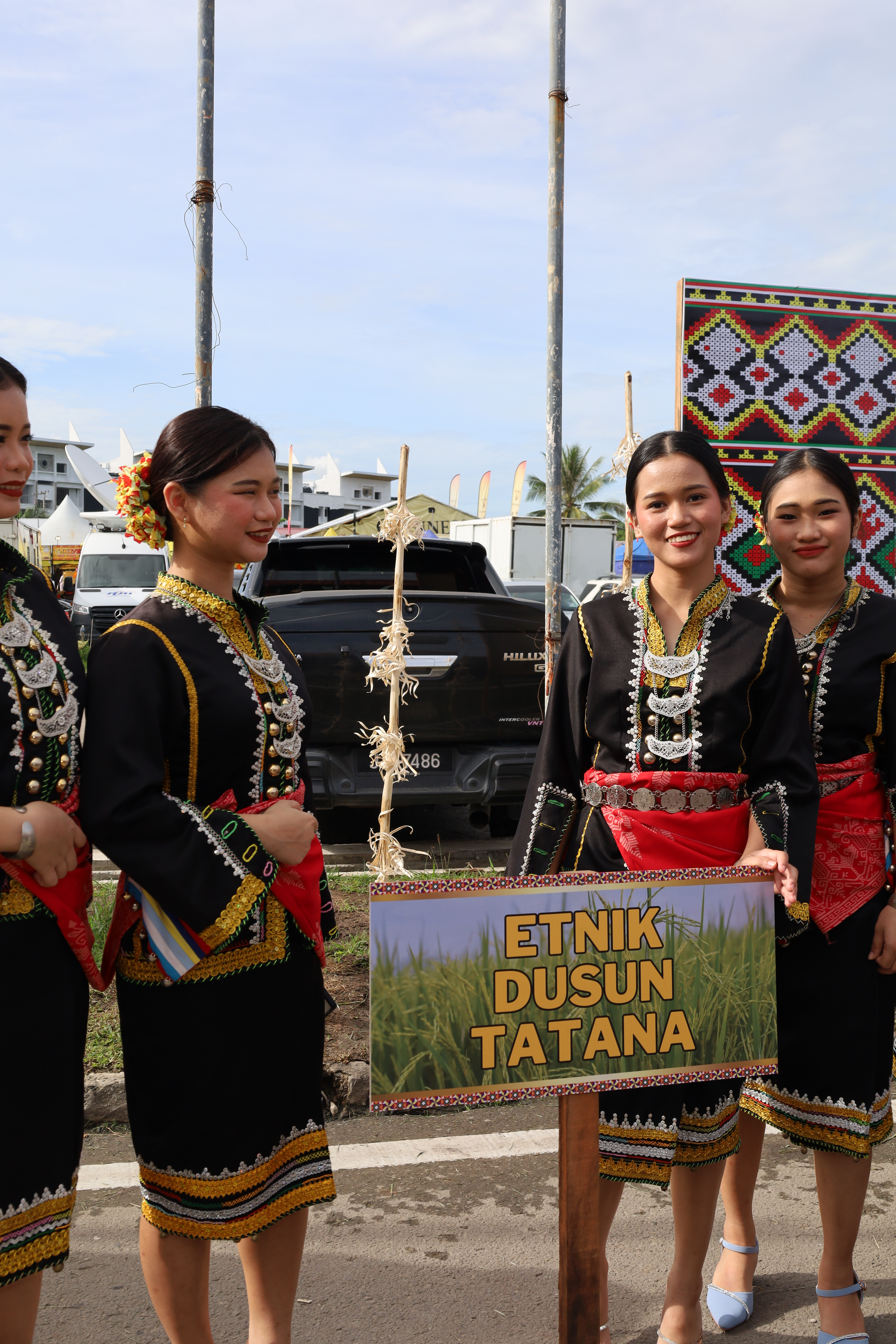
Tatana Dusun, the main Dusun sub-ethnic in Kuala Penyu District

The main Dusun sub-ethnic group in the Kuala Penyu District as well as neighbouring Beaufort, both located in the southern part of Sabah is the Tatana where their culture is different from all Dusuns since it is similar to Chinese culture but mixed with some traditional Dusun customs which are the only Dusun sub-ethnic group that celebrates Lunar New Year as their main festival. The Tatana were originally pagan until the arrival of predominantly Hakka Chinese from Guangdong of China to the area of Kuala Penyu around the 1870s throughout the British administration, which greatly influenced the cultural practices of the sub-ethnic group involved to this day. Kaamatan is also celebrated by these sub-tribes since it is a statewide public holiday festival celebrated annually by the whole Kadazan-Dusun ethnic group, with 94% of the Tatana community adhering to Christianity (mostly Roman Catholicism) including a significant Muslim minority owing to intermarriages with other ethnicities such as the Bisayas, Bruneian Malays and Kedayans, with some practising ancestral and Chinese beliefs inherited from their ancestors, albeit syncretised with Christianity (especially in its Roman Catholic form). The Tatana Dusun traditional house is called baloi. The animist-pagan Tatana Dusun still practise some traditional rituals to this day, where they believe that humans have guardian spirits known as Diwato, some of the rituals include berasik, koduaan, manawak and momiliu apart from the moginum ritual. Tatana Dusun is also known for their traditional dance of Sayau Moginum which originates from the moginum ritual, a special ceremony to summon the spirits of ancestors or deceased family members to attend a celebratory event.

=== Papar Dusuns ===
Apart from the majority Tangaah Kadazans in Papar District, there is a minor Dusun sub-ethnic group called the Malapi Dusun whose language and ethnic identity is considered severely endangered (but most of them are also conversant in the Tangaah Coastal Kadazan language owing to intermarriage as well as assimilation factors with the said majority tribe). The areas within Ulu Papar feature another two Dusun sub-ethnics, the Tuhawon (Liwan) and the Tagahas, who were previously rivals who fought for generations over territory and land issues until both swore to never wage wars against each other again by marking their oath with a permanent allegiance in the form of a stone. These communities feature a total of 1,000 Kadazan/Dusun villagers in nine villages of the Ulu Papar/Ulu Moyog region that straddles between the borders of Penampang and Papar district such as Buayan, Kalanggaan, Kionop, Longkogungan, Podos, Pongobonon, Terian, Tiku and Timpayasa (historically all part of the Ulu Papar region of Papar, but today geographically and administratively located in the Ulu Moyog area of neighbouring Penampang district owing to its proximity to Penampang rather than Papar).

=== Penampang Dusuns ===
Similar to neighbouring Papar, Penampang District is dominated mostly by the Tangaah Kadazans, with several Tuhawon and Tagahas Dusuns villages located within the Ulu Papar/Moyog area on its remote tripoint border area with neighbouring Tambunan as well as Papar district, although nowadays these tribes has since been assimilated with the majority coastal and riverine Tangaah Kadazans by means of language assimilation/shift as well as intermarriage, the Penampang Dusuns are actually linguistic-wise bilingual in both Coastal Kadazan as well as Central Dusun languages owing to some certain factors such as intermarriages by Central Dusuns from Kota Kinabalu city (Inanam, Manggatal and Telipok areas) as well as Tuaran district (Ulu Tuaran area in the sub-districts of Kiulu and Tamparuli) and also from districts such as Ranau, Tambunan, Kota Marudu, Kota Belud, Beluran, Keningau as well as Telupid (who emigrated as well as resided in the Ulu Moyog area alike) with the local interior Tangaah populace of mixed Tuhawon-Tagahas tribal descent as well as geographical reasons in which the Ulu Moyog/Papar region of this district borders with the neighbouring Tambunan district in Sabah's interior.

=== Ranau Dusuns ===
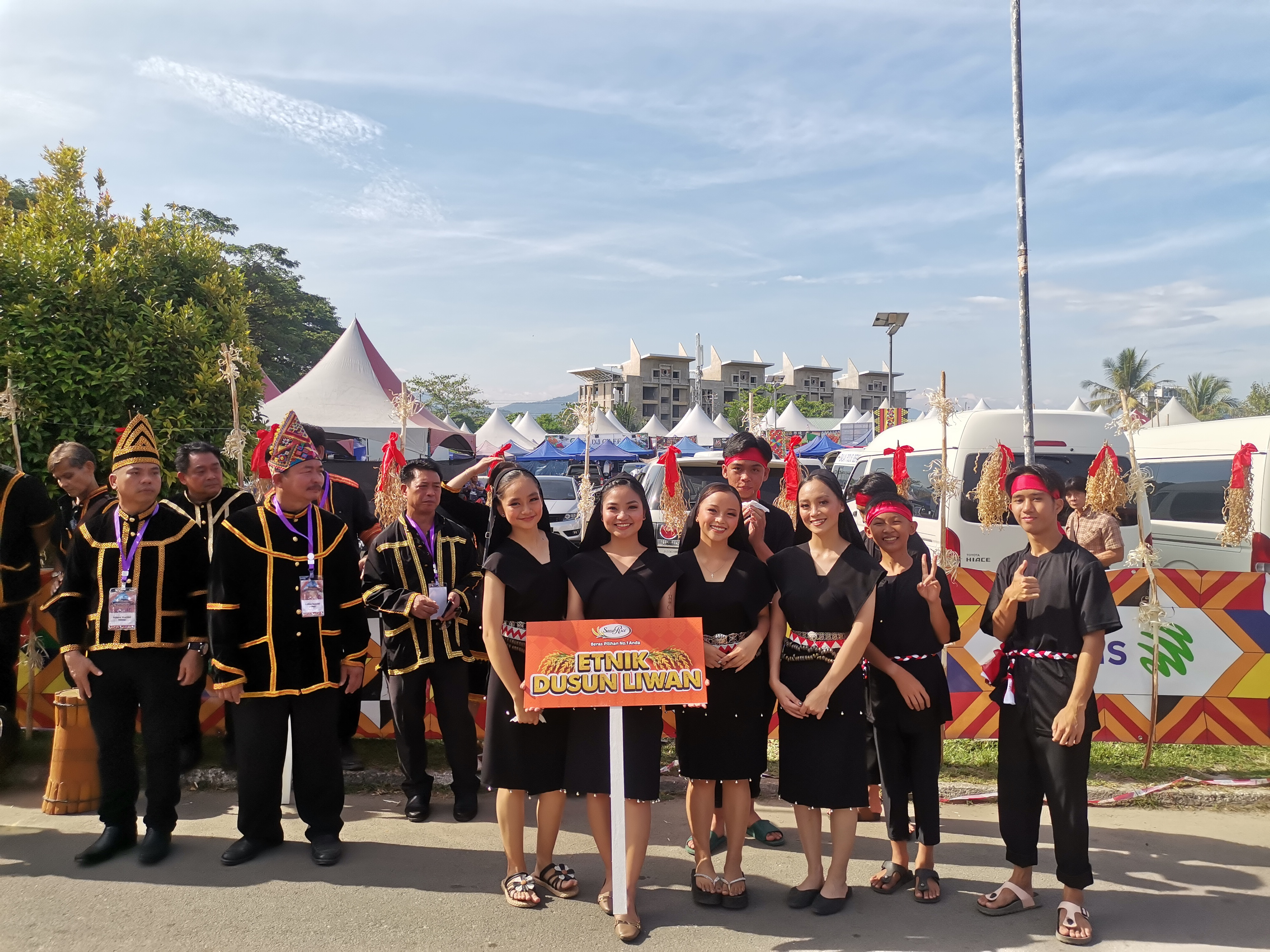
Liwan Dusun is the main sub-ethnic group in Ranau District, which is known to use sunduk (veil) for its female dress, aside from the Tindal and Tobilung Dusuns in neighbouring Kota Belud District

Liwan Dusun is the largest Dusun sub-ethnic group in Ranau District, where it is further divided into two Liwans, namely the Sarayo Liwan and Tanah Rata Liwan. The Sarayo Liwan sub-ethnic was firstly spread around Tagudon Lama village, then later in Waang, Kiwawoi, Sosondoton, Ratau, Tudan, Manantangah, Tambiau, Mohimboyon, Terolobou, Kibbas, Toboh Lama as well as Toboh Baru and its surrounding areas within the Kundasang sub-district, with the earliest villages inhabited by this sub-ethnic in Tanah Rata (Ranau proper) are notably the villages of Kituntul, Marakau, Kokob, Matan, Libang, Tagudon Baru, Kimolohing, Sinarut, Tudangan, Maukab as well as Kilimu. The Liwan are known for their traditional dances of Sumirid Modtomu especially to the Kundasang area of Ranau, which is deeply rooted in the agrarian lifestyle of the Liwan Dusun, particularly their rice cultivation practices. The dance movements inspired from the Mongogik, a practice to manually separates rice grains from their stalks by stomping bare feet before the advent of modern rice machines. It was an essential process to preparing harvested rice which subsequently evolved into the symbolic movements that now characterise the traditional dance. The traditional dress for Liwan females in Ranau is the abaya.

The Tinagas Dusun tribe is usually found in Malinsau as well as surrounding villages, all located in the Ulu Sugut sub-district on its border with Beluran district in neighbouring Sandakan division of Sabah's East Coast. Another Dusun sub-ethnic, the Talantang Dusun is also the dominant tribe among the Dusuns in Ranau District where it has several sub-tribes that form clans and some have even formed new tribes when they migrated to neighbouring districts, such as the Tobilung Dusun and the Sukang Dusun. The Dusuns in Ranau District can be considered as more closely representative of the original Dusun stock than other Dusun sub-ethnics since the area in which they reside is the origin birthplace of the entire Dusun ethnic population, the Nunuk Ragang. A significant portion or large majority of Ranau Dusuns had embraced Islam from animism, especially in the area of Kundasang (and to a lesser extent in villages such as Poring, Bongkud as well as Lohan located in Tanah Rata or Ranau proper) owing to mass Islamisation of this tribe from 1940 until 1976 particularly during the colonial as well as United Sabah National Organisation (USNO) rules, while a number also adhere strongly to Christianity (in which the largest single denomination amongst them would be the SIB church or formerly known as the Borneo Evangelical Mission (BEM), with minorities belonging to other denominations such as Roman Catholics, Anglicanism, Seventh-day Adventism, Lutheranism and other Christian branches).

=== Tambunan Dusuns ===
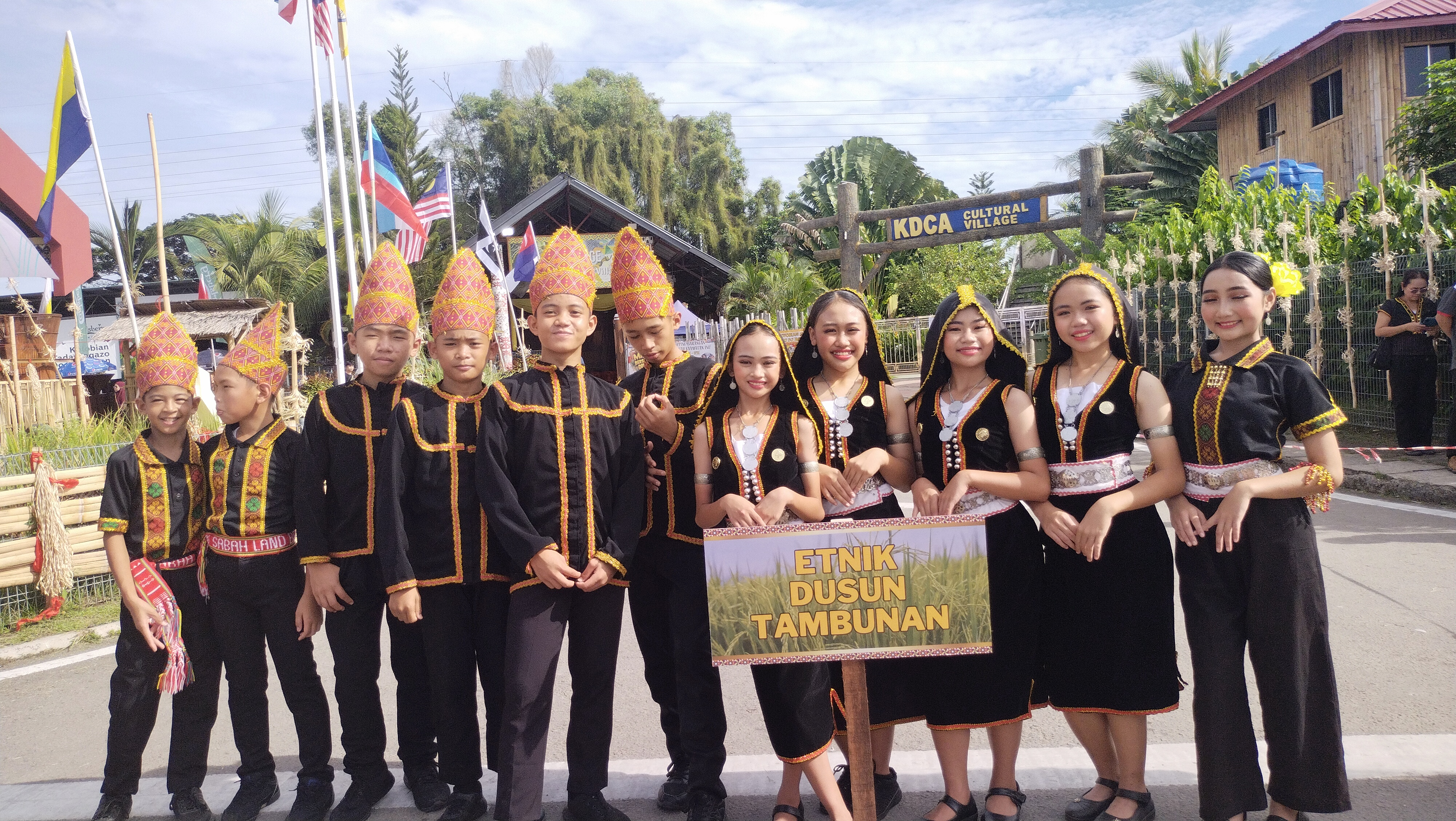
The "Tambunan Dusuns" sub-group term, are further divided into several more sub-groups of the Dusuns such as the Tuhawon (present-day Liwan), Tagahas, and Tibabar

In Tambunan District, the Dusun sub-ethnics there are more generally grouped under "Tambunan Dusuns", where it was originally further divided into several more sub-ethnics such as the Tuhawon/Tuwawon Dusun, Tagahas Dusun, Tibabar Dusun, Bundu Dusun, Gunnah Dusun, Palupuh Dusun and Kohub Dusuns in the early 20th century, but only three sub-tribes, such as the Tuhawon (present-day Liwan), Tagahas and Tibabar, remain today. The Tambunan Dusuns associate their ancestors with Nunuk Ragang, as revealed in the "Tambunan Dusun Origin Myth". Based on the folklore that after leaving Nunuk Ragang, the family broke up and went their separate ways and made a hut with each name based on the tree and location; they ended up building a settlement which is the origins of the seven Tambunan Dusun sub-tribes. Based on the research by Thomas Rhys Williams in 1965, he describes:

Prior to 1880s, the Tambunan valley was occupied, and appears to have served as a boundary zone and cockpit of head warfare for several local groups. After 1885, native police patrols under European officers of the NBCC established a tenuous form of order sufficient to allow initial settlement on the northern fringe of the plain, settlement of the valley floor along the eastward course of the Sunsuron River proceeds rapidly in the year 1900–1925. However, continued fears of head taking slowed settlement of the central and south portions of the Tambunan plain. Those areas, along the southward course of the Pegalan River, were not cleared of primary jungle until the mid 1930s'.

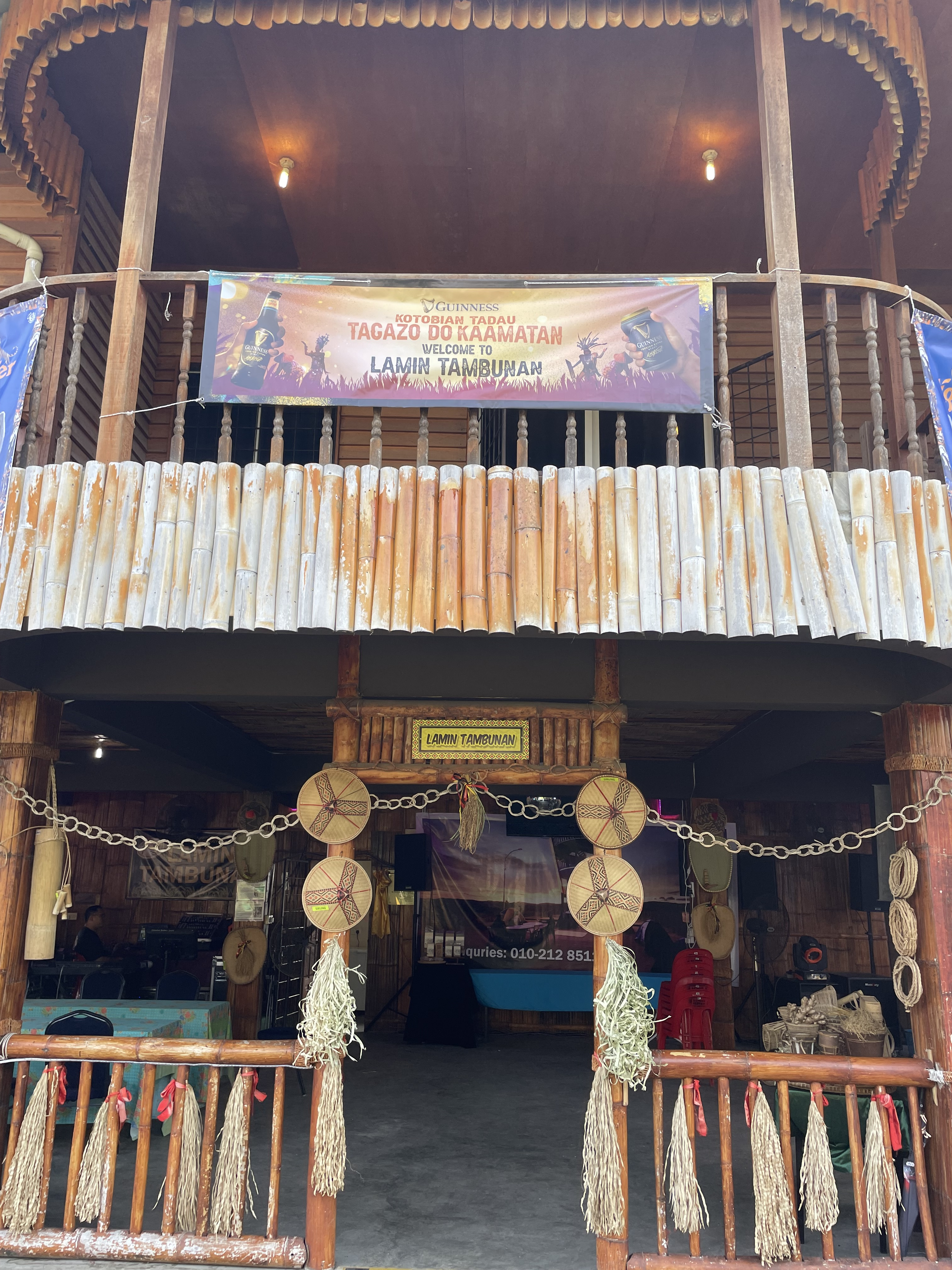
A lamin (traditional house) replica of the Liwan Dusuns of Tambunan at the KDCA

In the past, the Tuwawon and Tagahas Dusuns had carried on a civil war against themselves, with guerrilla warfare between the two causing the NBCC to take urgent measures when Mat Salleh, the well-known rebel in North Borneo, allied himself with the Tagahas Dusuns to fight against the Tuwawon Dusuns in the 1890s. Through several campaigns led by the NBCC, which allied with the Tuwawon Dusuns, and the subsequent demise of Mat Salleh after being killed by NBCC forces, the British further consolidated the Dusun tribes' term to unite the Dusun sub-ethnics and to avoid further division among them. The majority of the Tambunan Dusuns are farmers, and most of them are engaged in planting paddy, fruit trees, vegetables and raising various animals, with the Tambunan town itself surrounded by terraced paddy fields and seventy picturesque villages. The Tuwawon mostly live in Kaingaran, Dabata, Karanaan, Monsourulung, Sungoi, Rompon, Madsangoh, Lotong, Kiawayan, Rantai (Apin-Apin Lama on its border with Keningau), Dalungan, Maras-Karas, Nandal, Kirokot, Tinompok, Kipaku, Mangi-Pangi, Laab, Sukung, Piasau, Sintuong-Tuong, Kuyungon, Sandapak, Garas, Pahu, Tontolob, Kinabaan, Lubong, Mangkatai, Katagayan, Tikolod, Makatip, Galiung, Pupuluton, Mogong, Kusob, Moloson, Rugading, Monsok, Nambayan, Papar, Solibog, Patau, Tanaki, Sukung, Tampasak, Sunsuron, Tondulu, Lintuhun, Daar, Paliu and Ragkam villages, while the Tagahas live in Kapayan, Ranggom, Tombotuon, Minodung, Kituntul and Toboh villages and the Tibabar in Tibabar village. Another Dusun sub-ethnic group known as the Gunnah Dusun, are traditionally distributed in the central area of Tambunan district mainly in the villages of Gagaraon, Botung, Pomotodon, Nouduh, Molout and Timbou.

Ethnically and linguistically related to the other Dusun tribes of the Bundu-Liwan valleys of the Crocker Range, this sub-ethnic group are religiously Christians (most of them being Roman Catholics since the late 19th and early 20th centuries), owing to mass Christianisation done by the Mill Hill Missionaries in today's Diocese of Keningau especially in their home district of Tambunan after converting their fellow Kadazan kinsfolk in Penampang as well as Papar, both located in Sabah's West Coast and the Archdiocese of Kota Kinabalu into the said religion, with minorities of this tribe's Christian populace being Protestants belonging to churches such as SIB, Seventh-day Adventist and many more other denominations, whilst a large non-Christian minority populace of them being Muslims especially those resident in the border villages surrounding the neighbouring district of Ranau, owing to intermarriages and assimilation factors.

=== Tongod Dusun ===
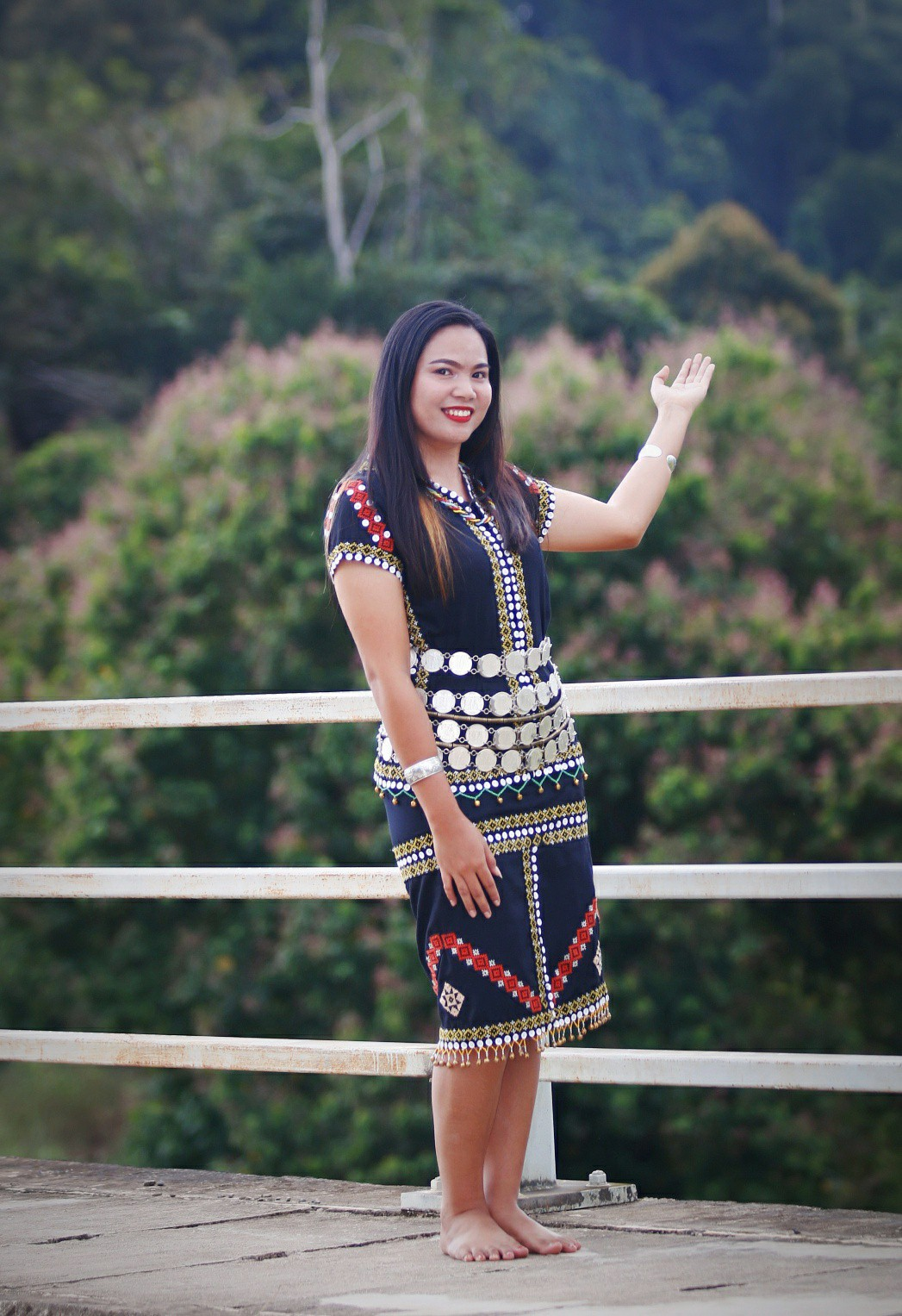
A Minokok Dusun female of Tongod District in traditional dress

In Tongod District, the main Dusun sub-ethnic group is the Minokok Dusun, with a population of 10,000 comprising 1,100 families in 2017. They reside around the villages of Kotodon, Linayukan, Maliau, Menanam, Namukon, Sanan, and Simpang Entilibon. The Minokoks in Kotodon Village are known for their traditional pottery making. Another sub-branch of the Minokok known as "Minokok Tompizos" is one of the Dusun sub-ethnic groups that mostly inhabit the Tongod and neighbouring Keningau areas.

=== Tuaran Dusun ===
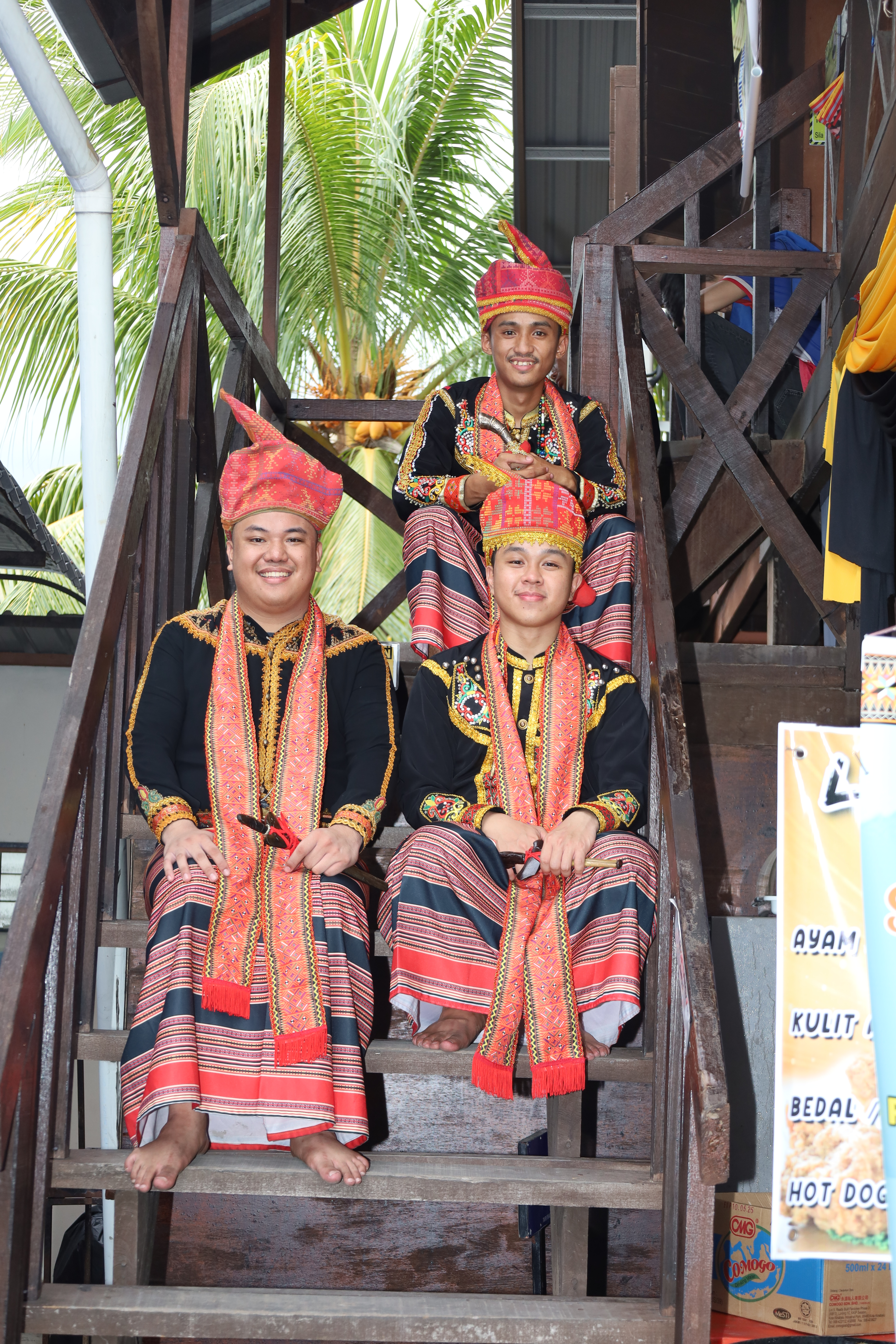
Lotud Dusun tanak wagu (young men) in Tuaran District

Another main sub-ethnic groups of the Dusuns is the Lotud, who reside in the Tuaran District (including Tamparuli sub-district and also Kiulu and Tenghilan villages) as well as the suburb of Telipok within Sabah's capital city of Kota Kinabalu. Most of the Lotuds reside in the area located between the main road connecting Ranau District with Kota Belud District. Numbering around 20,000 people in 2022, the Lotud form the foundation of the Lotud customary law that is recognised by the Native Court of Sabah. The Lotud sub-ethnic group was synonymous with the word "Suang Lotud" and can be found in nearly 50 villages within the Tuaran district. The cultural foundation of the Lotud is based on the belief in the existence of the creator Kinorohingan or Minamangun. In 2021, the Lotuds were recognised as one of the 36th major indigenous ethnic groups in Sabah.

The Adat or Custom of Lotud Dusuns' marriage processes is divided into 35 segments such as modsuruhan (bilateral meeting), monunui (engagement), tinunui (wedding gift), popiodop (staying together), matod (wedding ceremony), and mirapou (welcoming ceremony). In the Lotud tribe's traditional society, parents usually determine their son's future partner. Before a formal relationship is established, the modsuruhan serves to deliver a message to engage the female through her family. The female's side will then respond with requests for a duration of days from the male's family before negotiations can be accepted; this period also allows the female's parents time to discuss with their daughter whether there are other males who have proposed or if she has already made up her mind. Many matters must be clearly communicated, such as the male's family tree, background, character, and capabilities, as well as evaluating the meaning of any dreams that occurred in the female's family. If the female's side has had a bad dream, "sogit mimpi" is performed for peace. According to traditional adat, if the male has no appointed partner, he may be fined under "adat malu" by the female's family.

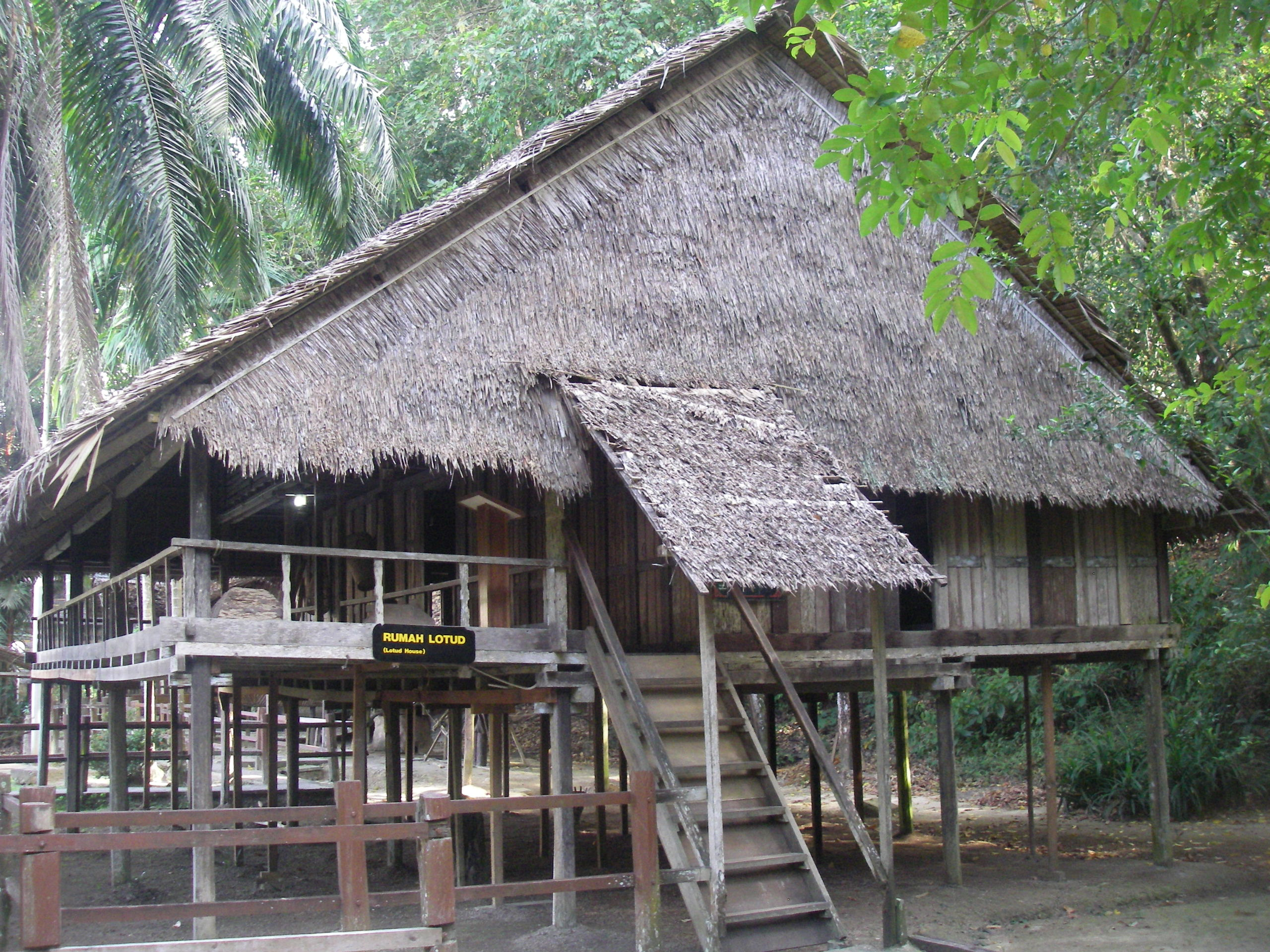
A typical traditional house of the Lotud Dusuns

The Linangkit Cultural Village in Selupoh village of Tuaran district became the main cultural centre of the Lotuds. Apart from this centre, there are several other cultural associations established within the district, such as the Lotud Cultural Heritage Association in Tagas village. A traditional Lotud House decorated with various traditional indigenous musical instruments, coconut shells and bamboo cups is located in the Sawah/Damat villages of Tamparuli sub-district. In present days, most Lotuds adhere to Roman Catholicism due to the strong influence of Catholic missionaries among the Dusuns in the 19th century, while Islam is also practised by some Lotuds, especially those who intermarried with Muslim ethnic groups such as the Bajaus who also reside in Tuaran district alongside this tribe. Before the arrival of both religions, animism was the predominant belief among the Lotuds. The animist-pagan Lotud believe that their God called Kinorohingan and his wife called Suminundu (Umunsumundu) have created the customs of the Lotuds simultaneously with the creation of the heavens, the earth and their contents. Humans were created from a mixture of rombituon muru-puru (cluster of seven stars) and Garau Ngadau (centre of the sun) and kondingau skin (cinnamon bark).

== Culture and society ==
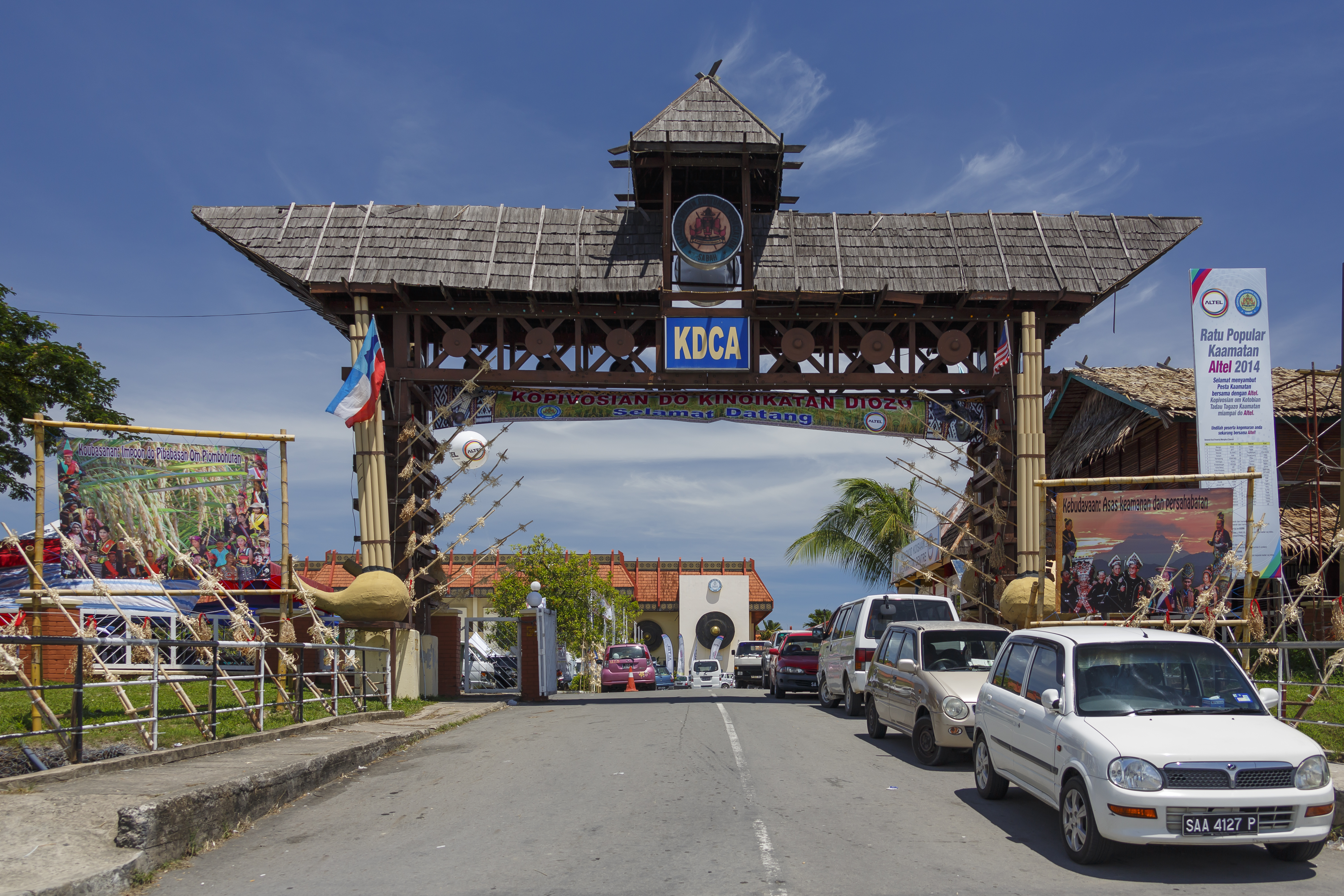
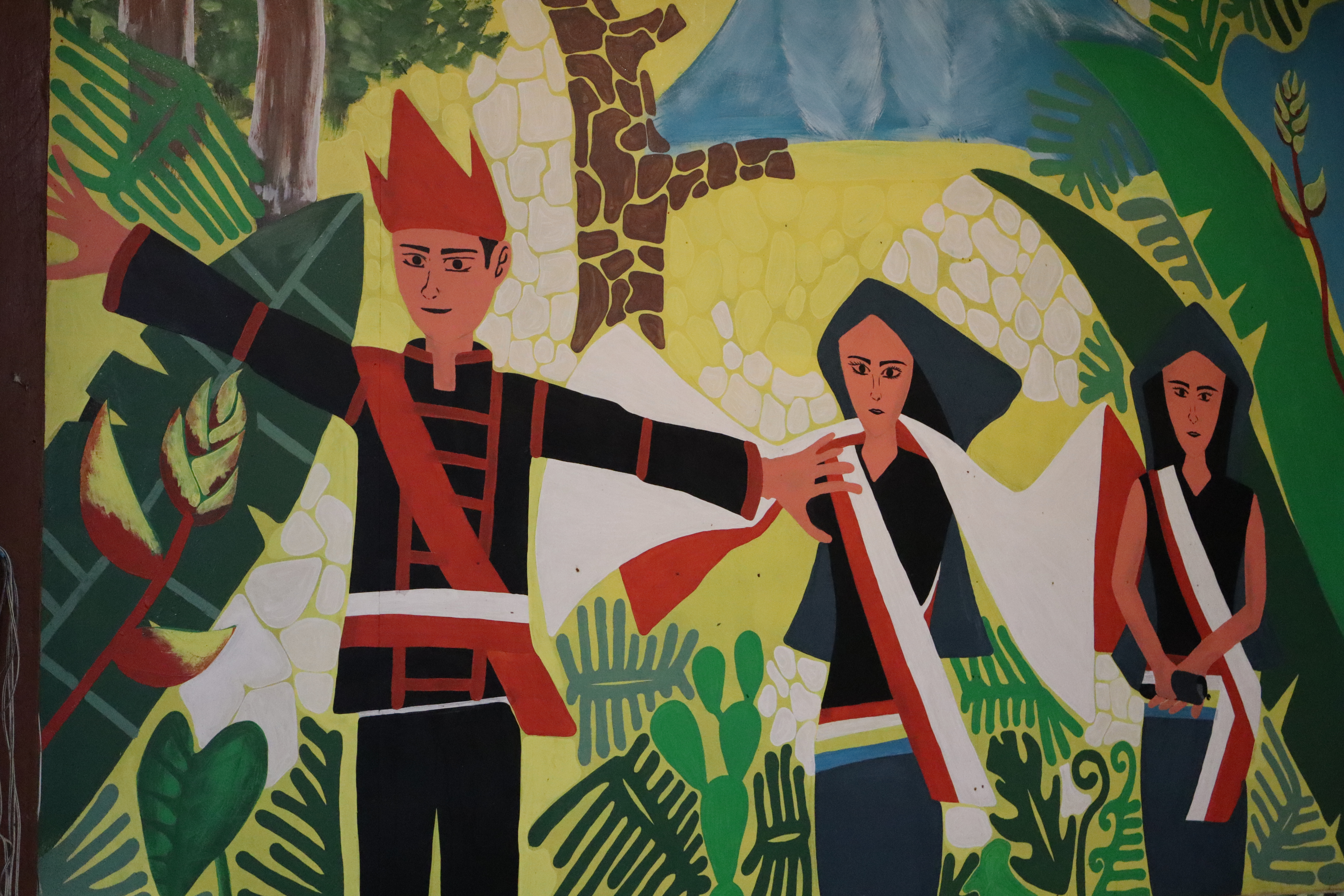
(Left) Kadazan Dusun Cultural Association (KDCA) Compound, where various cultural activities of the Dusunic people together with the Kadazan, Murut, Rungus, Lundayeh, and Paitan are being held annually during the Kaamatan
(Right) Mural of Tobilung Dusun at walai (traditional house) of the Tobilung

The culture of the Dusuns is deeply connected to agriculture, particularly rice cultivation, with rituals and festivals such as the annual harvest festival of Kaamatan celebrated every year in the month of May to honouring the rice spirit of Bambaazon/Bambarayon. It is a one-month celebration from 1 to 31 May with 30 and 31 May are the main point for the state-level celebration that happens at the place of the yearly Kaamatan host in Hongkod Koisaan of Penampang District. The celebration is synonymous with a beauty pageants competition known as Unduk Ngadau (female) and Buvazoi Tavantang (male), a singing competition known as Sugandoi, tamu (street market), both non-halal and halal food and beverages stalls, and handicraft arts and cultural performances in traditional houses. Historically animist (Momolianism), the Dusuns hold beliefs in nature spirits and ancestral veneration, though many are now Christians or Muslims. During the old days, Kaamatan was celebrated to give thanks to ancient gods and rice spirits for the bountiful harvesting to ensure continuous paddy yield for the next paddy plantation season. Although the Kaamatan is still celebrated as an annual tradition, it is no longer celebrated for the purpose of meeting the demands of the ancestral spiritual traditions and customs but rather in honouring the customs and traditions of the ancestors. Present-day celebration is rather more symbolic as a reunion time with family and loved ones, where it is celebrated as per individual personal aspiration. Modern hunting and farm/ancestral land protection improvised firearms, such as the bakakuk are commonly used by the indigenous Dusuns, where it is also considered "customary" in rural contexts among the indigenous community. The use of sigup kirai and langkum is widespread among the Dusun elderly, especially females.

=== Contributions towards local medical practice ===
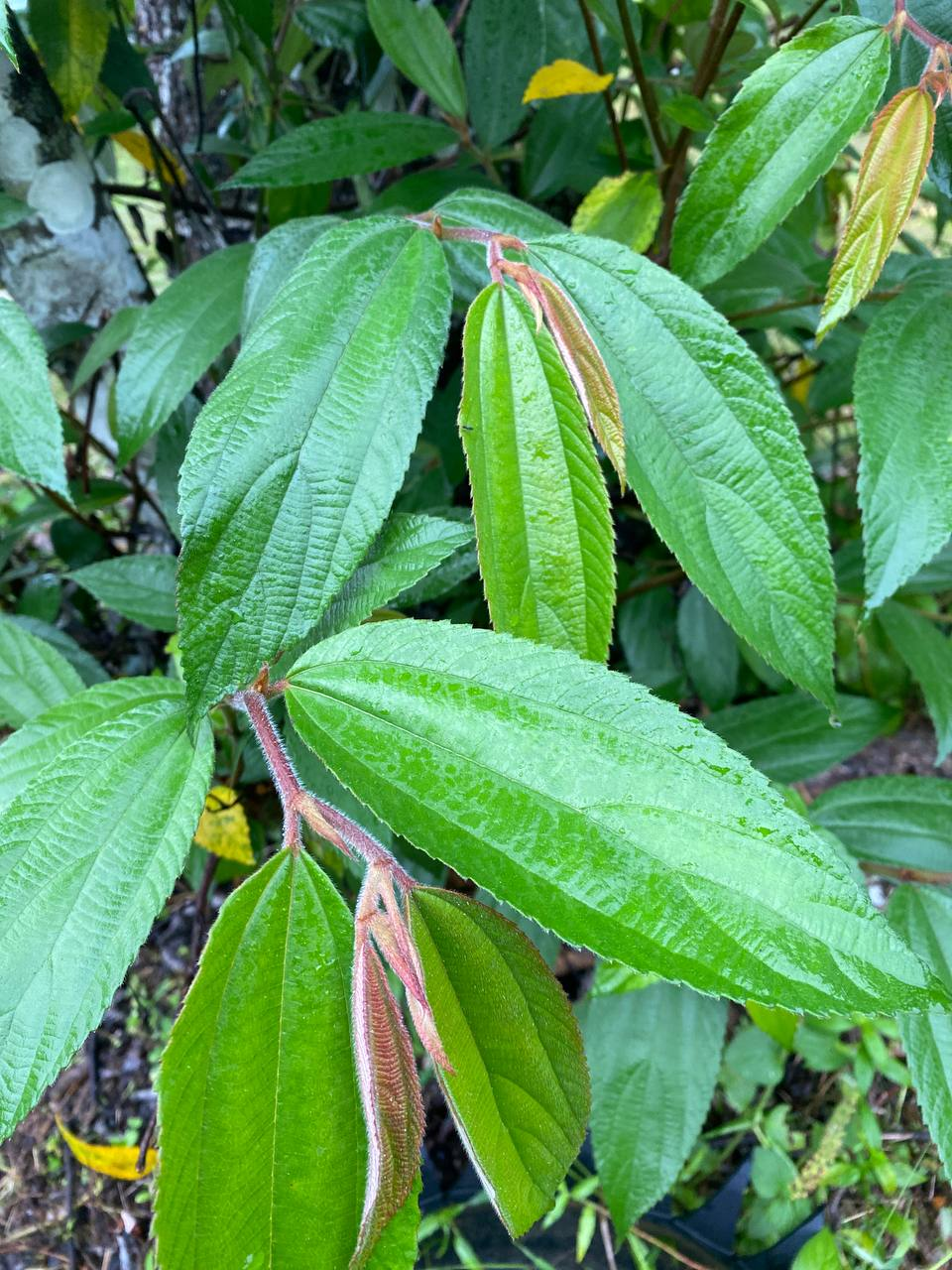
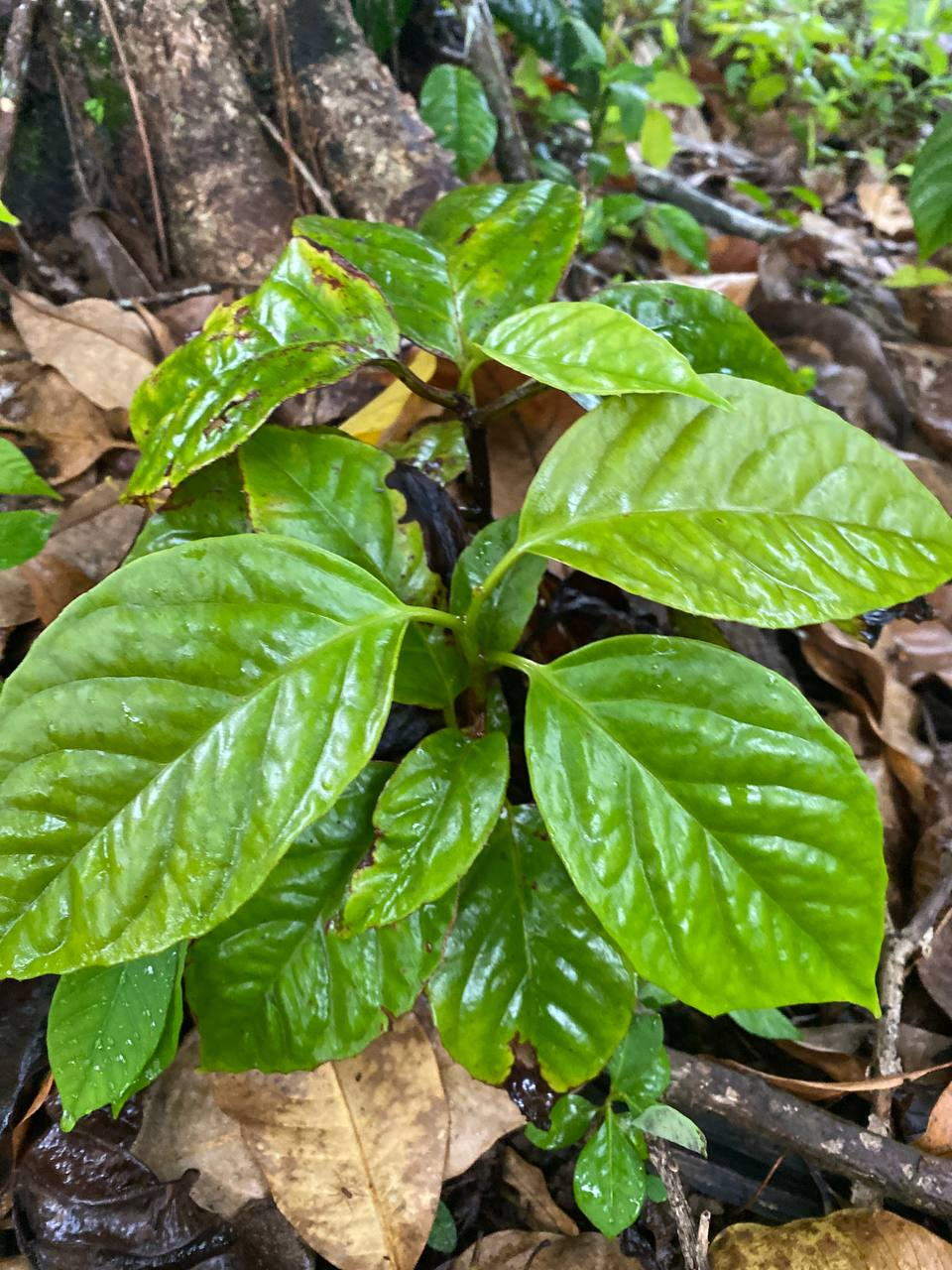
(Left) Mandahasi (Leucosyke capitellata), a plant commonly known among the Dusun community to cure sicknesses such as back pain, stomach bloating, diarrhoea, and eyes pain
(Right) Kosup (Chloranthus spicatus) is used by the Dusuns to treat various types of wounds

Being known as the "people of the orchards" with their settlement surrounded by a variety of native tree species, the Dusun people are known for their traditional healing and medical herbs. Within their native range settlement of the Crocker Mountains, around 50 plant species are commonly used to treat specific ailments among the communities, which include those used for treating common afflictions such as coughs, diarrhoea, fever, malaria, various skin diseases, and minor wounds. The Tobilung Dusun of Kudat are known for a total of 49 species of plants from 33 families that were used by the community to treat specific ailments. The Dusuns of the Toboh Laut Village of Keningau District are known for their three types of herbs that are still used until the present, namely the lintotobou, tawawo, and tompu.

Tawawo is commonly used in postpartum baths for indigenous Dusun women, and lintotobou is consumed to stop bleeding as well as restore body energy, while tompu are commonly used to treat various skin diseases. Among the Dusuns of Tikolod Village in Tambunan District, 75 species of plants (in 44 families) were used as medicines while the rest either used for constructions, handicraft, musical instruments and animal traps. In 2012, the Traditional and Complementary Medicine Bill (T&CM) was passed by the Parliament of Malaysia for the establishment of "Traditional and Complementary Medicine Council or Majlis Perubatan Tradisional dan Komplementari" to register and regulate traditional and complementary medicine practitioners, including traditional Chinese medicine practitioners as well as Malay, indigenous and Indians traditional medicine which followed by the enforcement of T&CM Act in the following year.

=== Cuisine ===
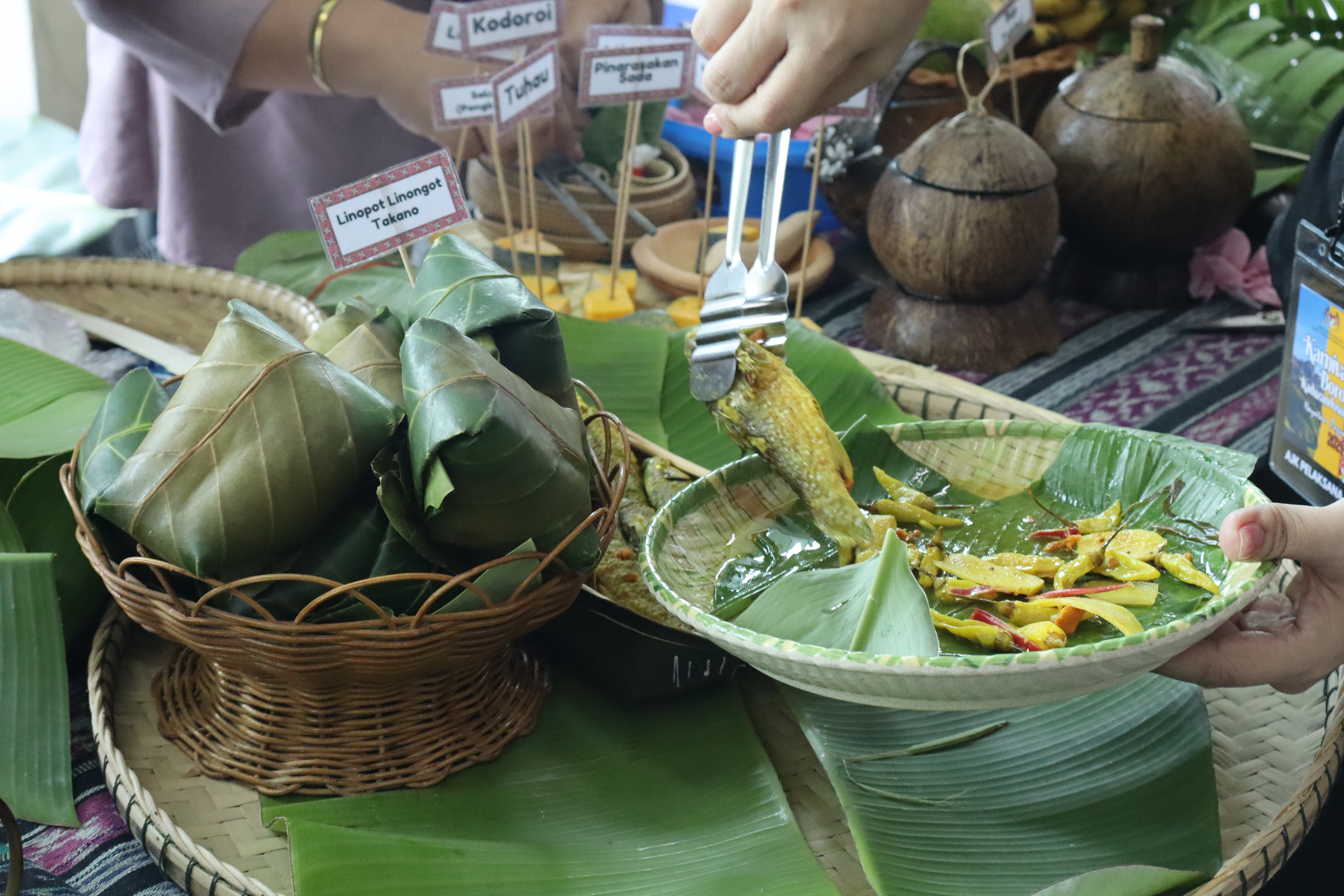
Some of the traditional foods of the Dusuns served during a state carnival

The Dusuns are known for their variety of traditional dishes based on each of the subgroups, with the cuisine infused with traditional herbs commonly known among the community, and since the Dusuns are agriculturalists, oryza sativa (Asian cultivated rice or commonly called parai among the Tambunan Dusuns) is a staple food for the indigenous community. Among the well known traditional foods of the Dusuns are linopot (meal of cooked rice mashed with root vegetables and wrapped in a doringin or tarap leaf), hinava tongii (picked Spanish mackerel combined with red chillies, shredded ginger, sliced shallots and drenched with lime juice), bosou or noonsom (Pangi fruit pickled, popular among the Dusuns of Ranau as tinamba), pinaasakan sada or sada pinarasakan (boiled stir-fry mackerel scad fish, popular among Ranau, Kundasang, Bundu Tuhan, Beluran and Sandakan Dusuns), kinoring soup (meat of a wild boar usually referred to by the locals as sinalau bakas), and manuk lihing soup (rice wine chicken soup). Some of the well-known traditional drinks of the Dusuns are tapai, tumpung or segantang, lihing, montoku, and bahar.

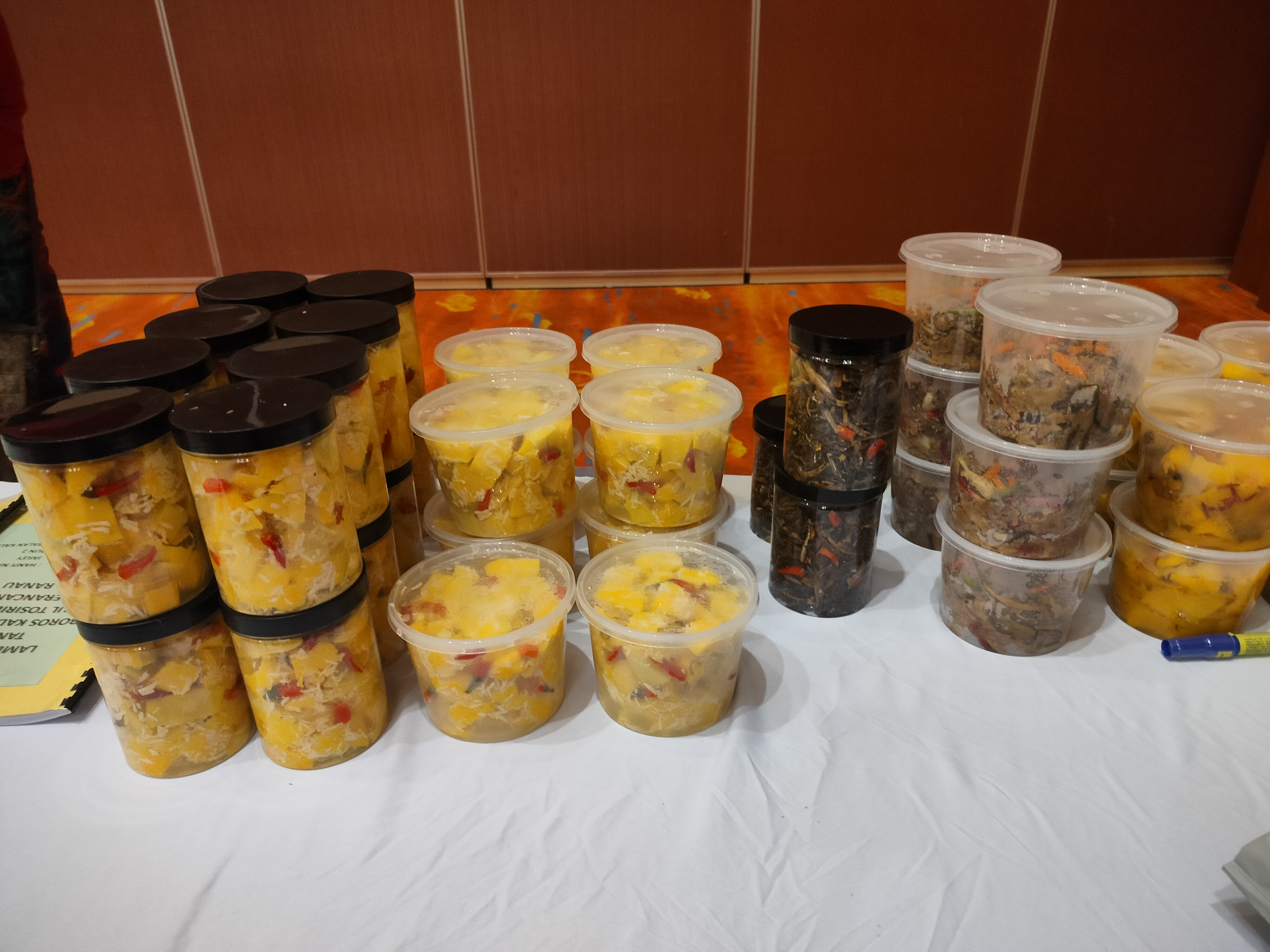
From left: Noonsom bambangan (Mangifera pajang), a wild mango pickle of the Dusuns, bosou or noonsom (Pangi fruit pickled), and kodop mushroom (Schizophyllum commune), some of the common delicacy among the Dusuns

The Dusuns are also known by their bambangan pickle or noonsom bambangan (Mangifera pajang, a brown wild mango grown in the jungle of Borneo), tuhau, also called noonsom tuhau (Etlingera coccinea, a tangy wild ginger condiment served in dishes like pickled tuhau, popular among the Dusuns of Keningau, Ranau, and Tambunan), and noonsom sada (freshwater fish fermented with rice, salt, and the contents of the pangi fruit). Ambuyat is another staple of the Dusuns, where it is usually served with pinaasakan and bambangan. Losun, a wild spring onions of Borneo is usually paired with linopot and hinava or anchovies. Kombos rice, a traditional coconut rice dish from the Lotud Dusun of Tuaran, is a staple among the community households, while another dish with a similar name, the Kombos tapai, is popular among the Dusuns of Kota Belud, including those from Labuk and Beluran. The Tatana Dusun of Kuala Penyu are known for their triangular-shaped tinimbu (also called tinimbuh) dumpling made from glutinous rice. Some mushrooms, such as the kodop (Schizophyllum commune), sawit or palm oil mushroom (Volvariella volvacea), tiram (Pleurotus spp.), korong (Auricularia spp.), and Marasmiellus species, were mostly consumed by the Dusuns and other indigenous people of Sabah as part of their daily diet.

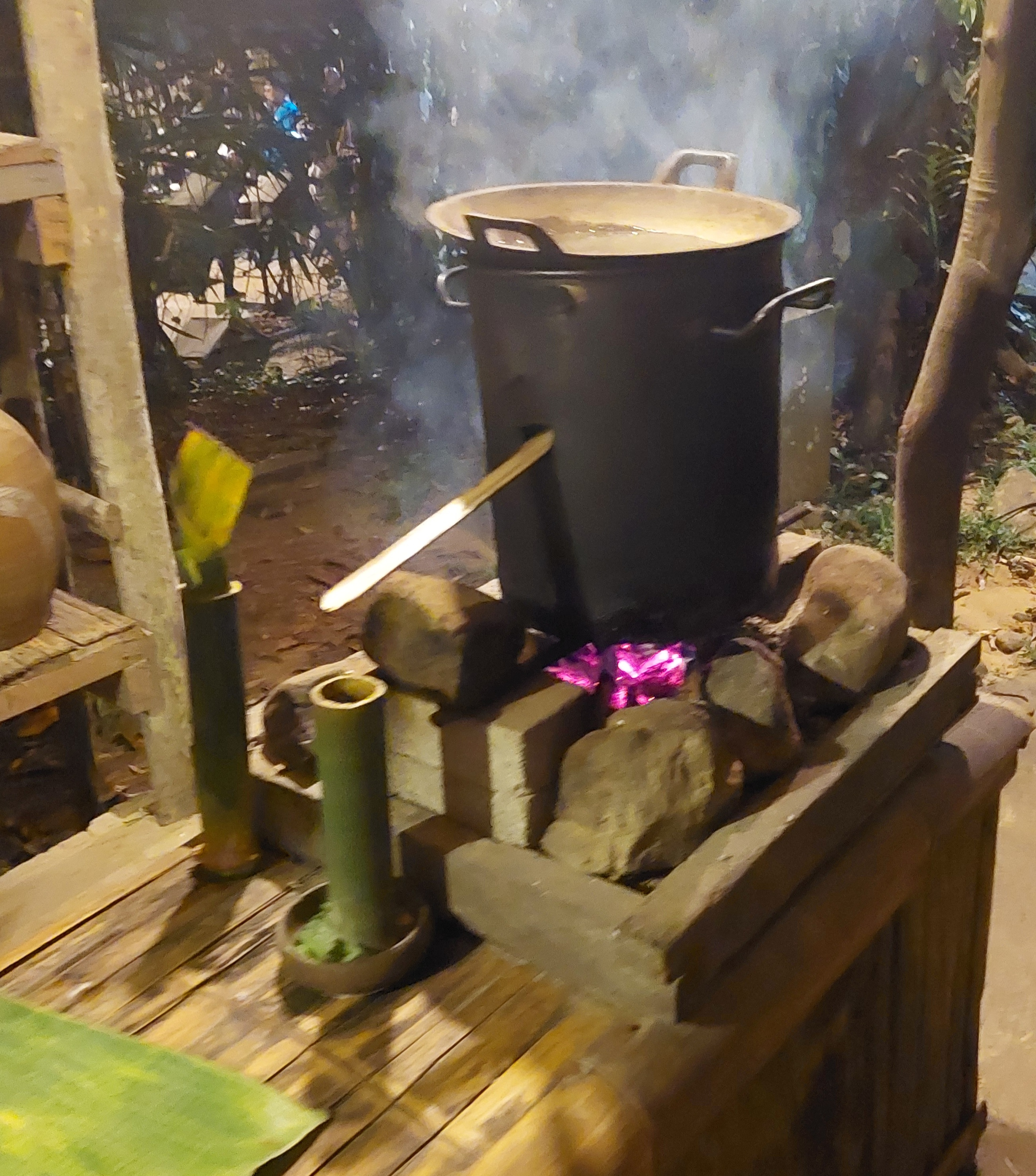
A traditional tool used for producing montoku, a type of rice wine of the Dusuns

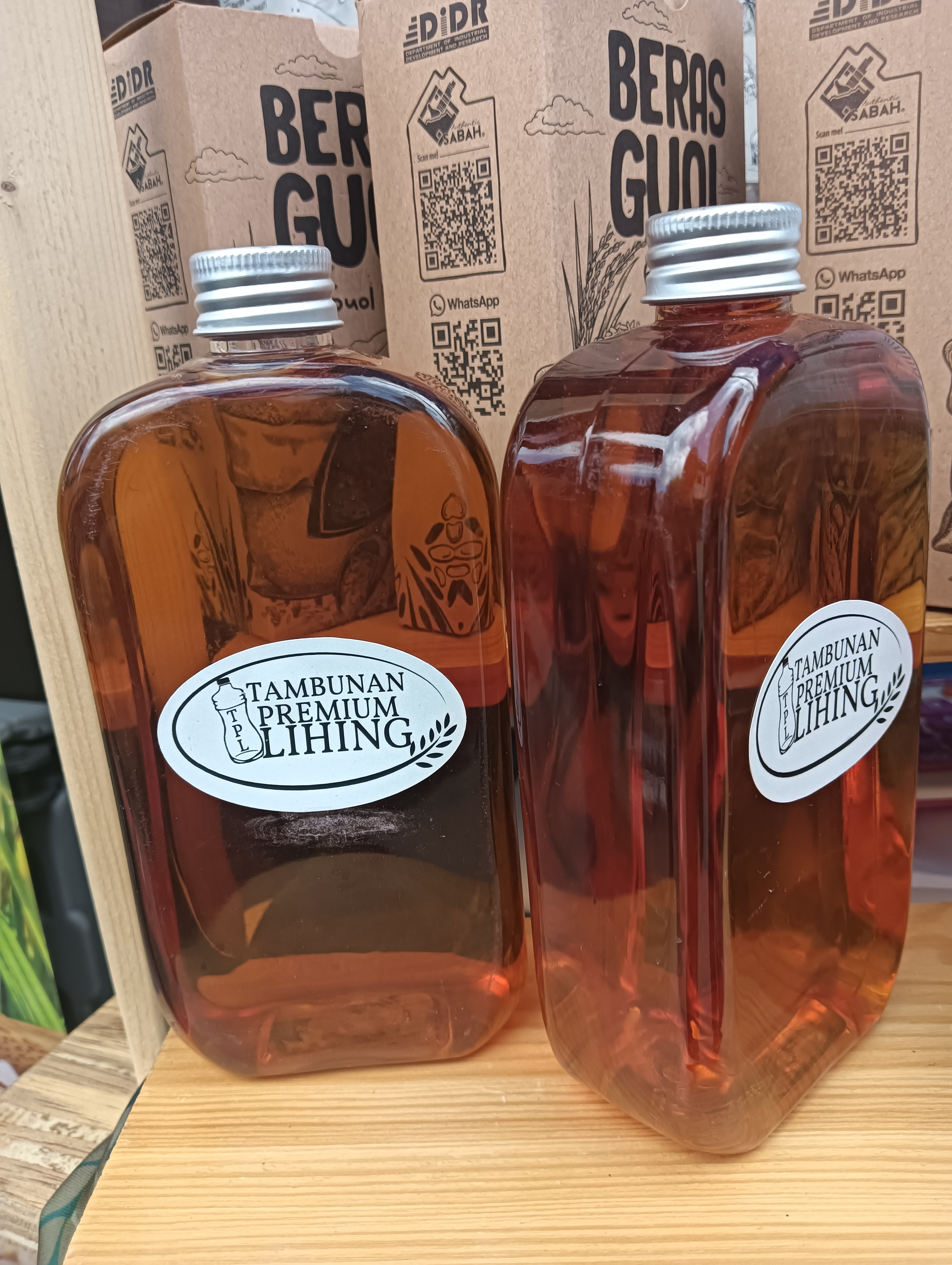
Commercially produced lihing of Tambunan in a bottle

The rice wine of the Dusuns, both traditional and commercial

The Liwan Dusun are known for their white linabok (leaf rice), linatok do mundok (boiled cassava), and soko om tuntui (boiled bamboo shoots and steamed banana flower), among others. The Tindal Dusun of Kota Belud are known for their tombowtong kiningkinan (special herb dishes) and taduk vegetable (araceae sheath) while the Kimaragang Dusun known for their gisak or gisakan soup (cow or buffalo intestine soup) and tonsom (rice or old corn that is ground and fried without oil, or can also use cassava, fish and banana stems). An exotic food of the Dusuns known as butod (Rhynchophorus vulneratus) is commonly served during Dusun festivals, with recent modern infusions mixed with sushi and pizza served within Dusun restaurants and coffeehouse around Sabah. Apart from the bambangan, the tarap fruit (Artocarpus odoratissimus) are also the common fruit delicacy among the Dusuns people. The Dusuns are known for their sup terjun (jumping soup) and gorouk soup (winter melon soup).

=== Ethnic attire ===
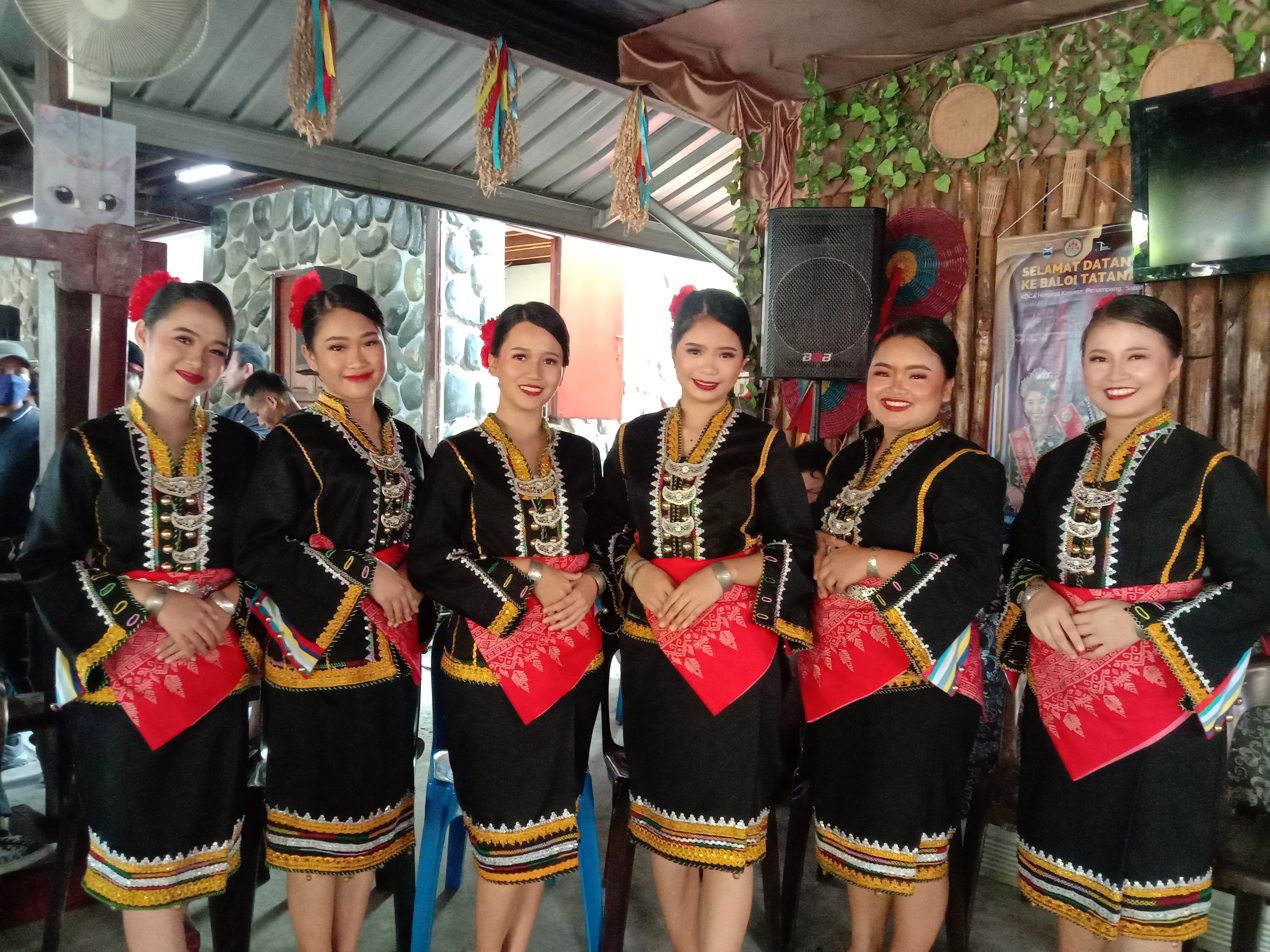
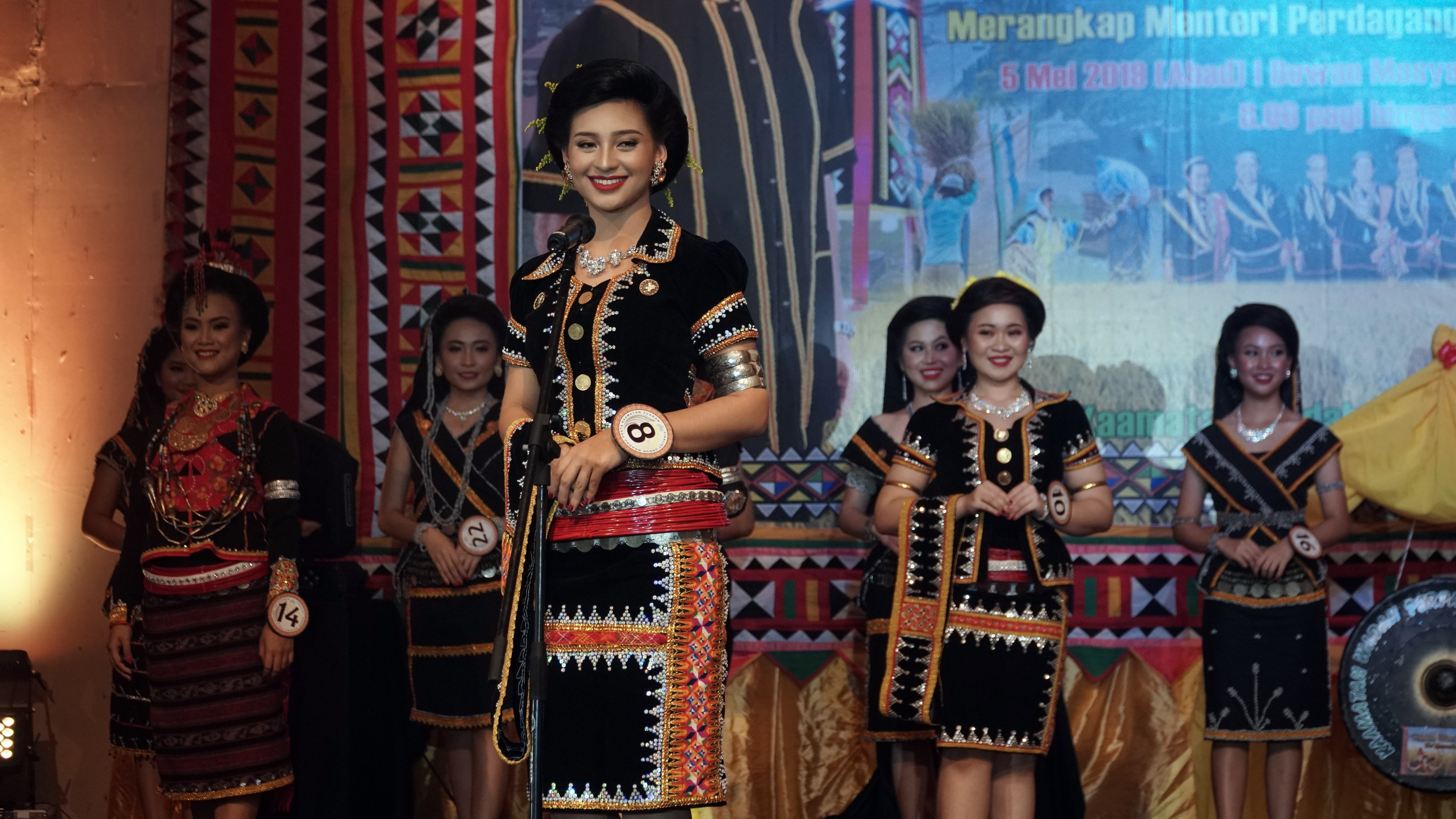
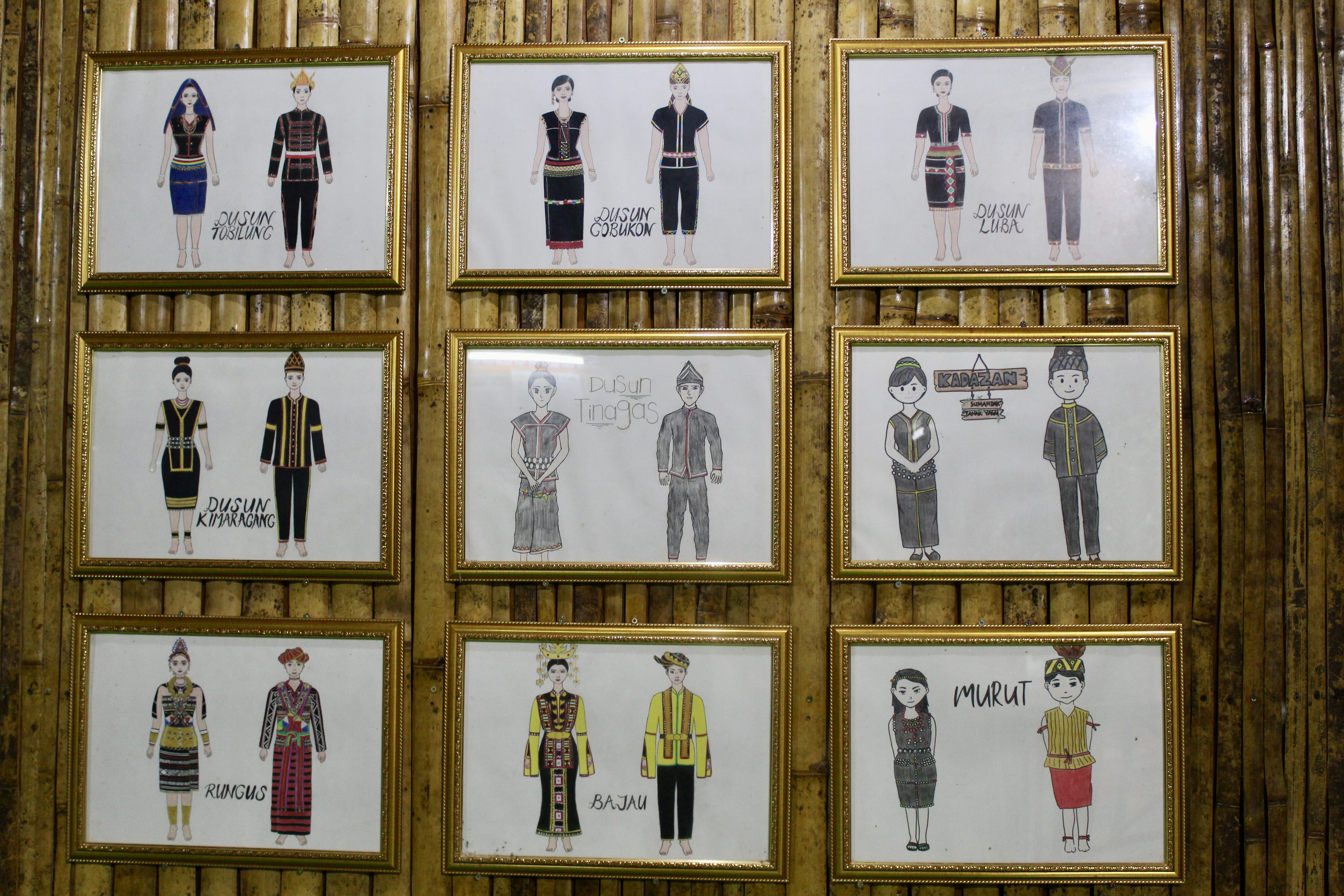
From top left, right, and bottom: Sira Lambung of the Tatana Dusun female, and a Lotud Dusun female Unduk Ngadau contestant during the Kaamatan with traditional gonob skirt and linangkit pattern, ethnic attire drawing of various Dusun subgroups including related ethnic groups

The traditional ethnic attire of the Dusuns is varied according to each subgroup. Black colour are synonyms among the Dusuns, similarly to the Kadazans, Muruts, and Rungus. The Liwan, Tagahas, Tindal and Tobilung Dusuns are known for their practice of wearing a sunduk or sinurundoi (veil) for female as a cover from sunlight, as a symbol of beauty and femininity during wedding ceremonies, and by the bobolian during ritual ceremonies. The Liwan traditional dress is garung lapoi for males, although the fabric of lapoi may also be used by females, while for the latter, sinombiaka rombituon is the main female dress commonly used during various ethnic ceremonies, including during weddings, which is usually paired with the sunduk veil. The Tindal Dusun has a unique traditional clothing design, known as sinuranga (male) and rinagang (female). Another traditional Tindal dress for the female is the sinipak, which is more synonymous among the Tindal Dusun who inhabit lower land areas, while the rinagang is popular among those who live in hilly or upper land areas. Both are worn together with the sunduk and come in black colour with colourful patterns, decorations and motifs, with the sinipak also coming in a version for males. The Tobilung Dusun are known for their ethnic dress, such as sinipakan/sinupakan or bangkad (male) and sinurangga linongkitan (female).

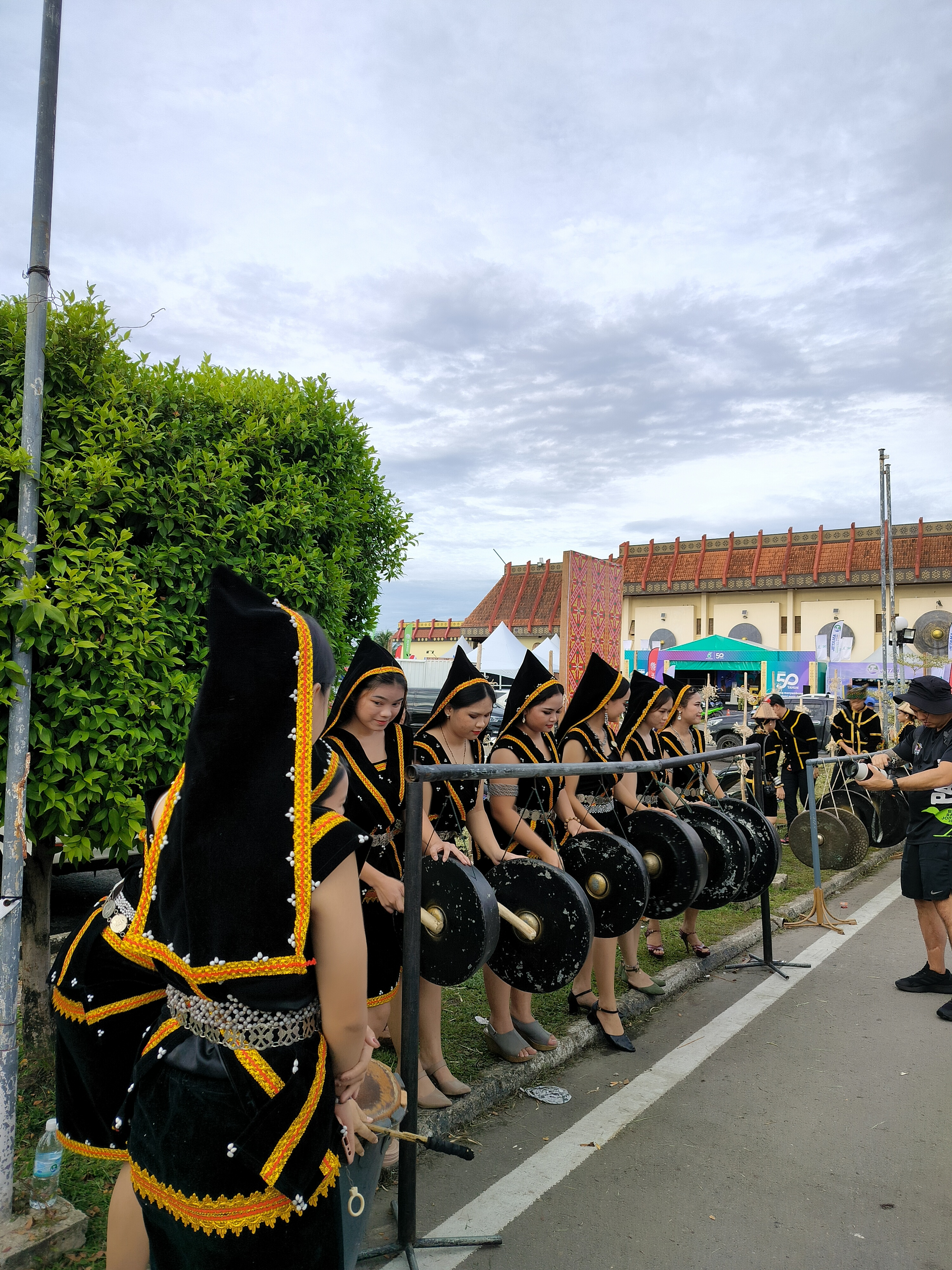
The Dusuns of Ranau with their sunduk (veil) at a ceremony at the KDCA entrance

The Kimaragang Dusun traditional dress is kinaling with a black colour and colourful sashes made of silver and rattan, especially for the Pitas-Koromoko Kimaragang, while the Kota Marudu-Tandek Kimaragang have their lapoi and sinudot. It is also graced with a cap made of rattan or bamboo woven together with a long fabric to complement their traditional dress to make it more attractive and unique. The Lotud Dusun women were known for their traditional skirts below the knees named gonob, and the word lotud in the Lotud dialect itself also carries the meaning of a knee which are believed to be derived from the Malay word of lutut. The traditional clothing of the Lotud community also symbolises their status, especially for women, with waist ornaments called lilimbo; the red symbolises "single status", the black symbolises "married status", and the brown or rattan colour symbolises an "elderly women". The Lotud has three types of traditional clothing, namely clothing used by tantagas or momolian (ritual leaders), clothing for sumayau (also known as madsayau) dancers for performance dances and wedding clothing. Linangkit embroidery is a name given for geometric motifs produced based on embroidery techniques with the design and decoration dominates the gonob and kuluwu decorations in Lotud traditional clothing. The linangkit patterns are characterised by geometric shapes dominated by triangles and squares, with the use of bright colours such as red, yellow, black, green and white to fill each of the geometric shapes formed into a variety of patterns. Several terms for patterns commonly embroidered by the Lotud community include the piniutu (joined), linodi (connected), nabur-abur (scattered), olinsong sadur (watermelon seeds), kinuyung-kuyung (wavy), subor (additional decoration), and piniating (repeated).

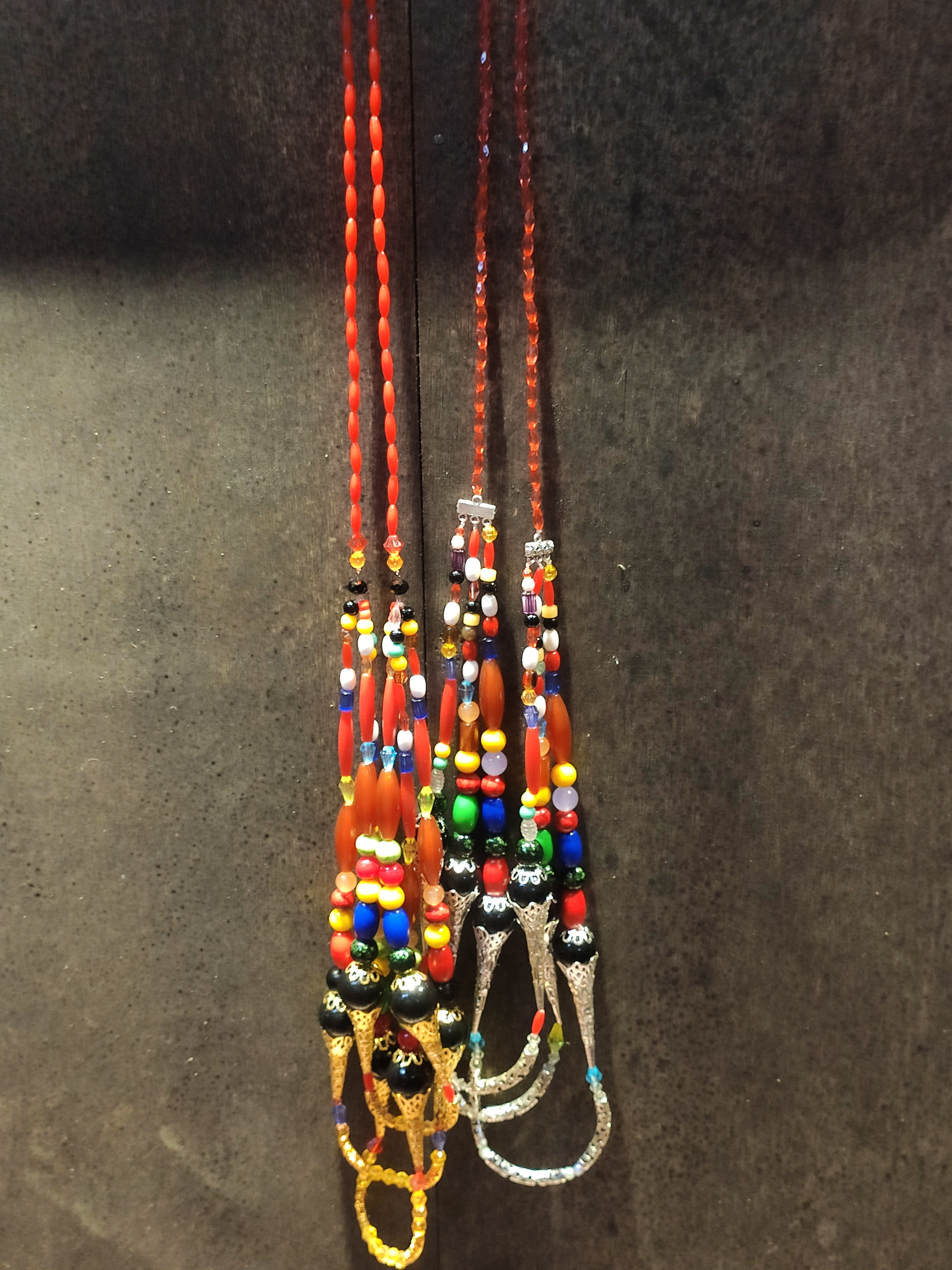
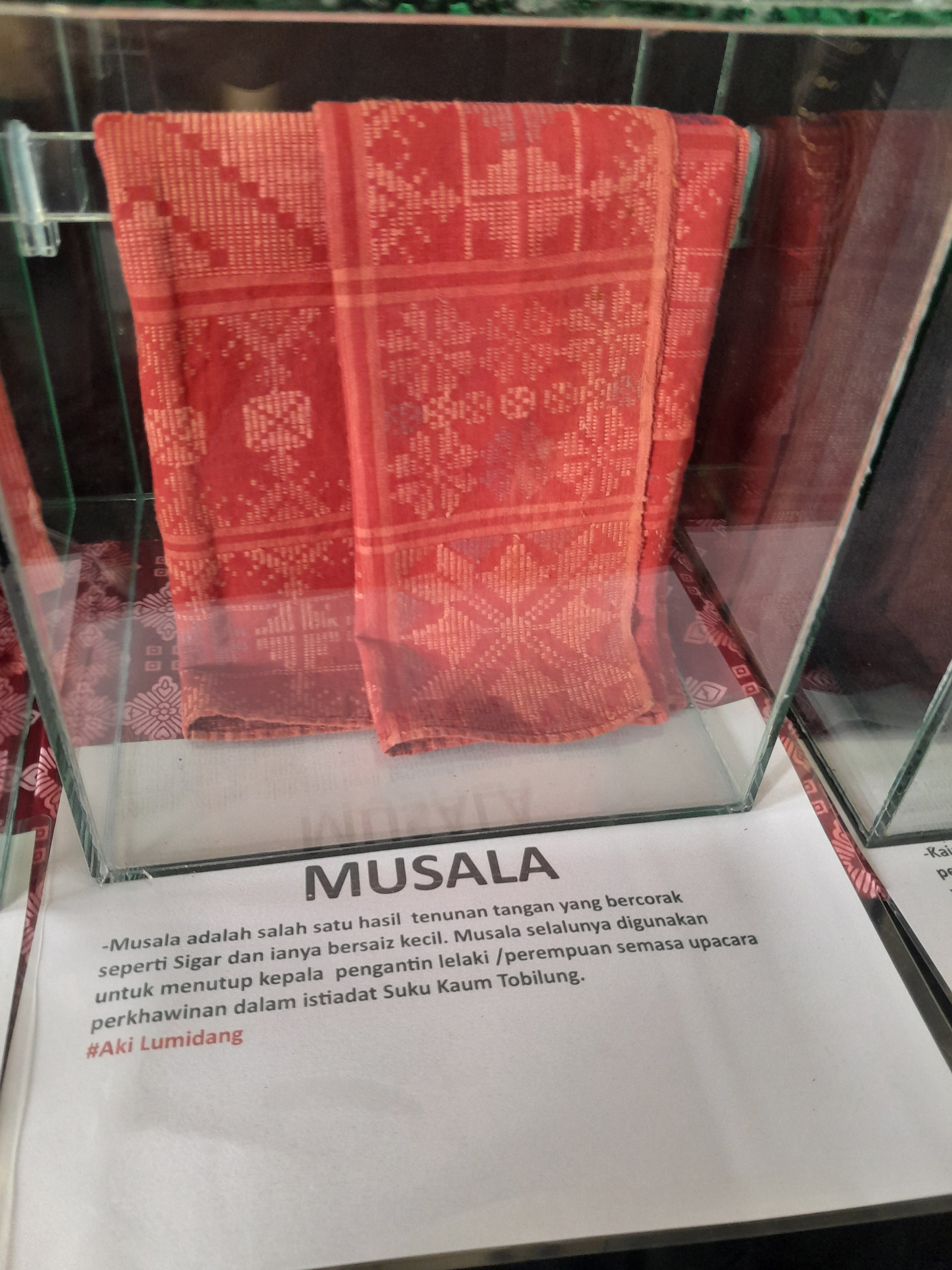
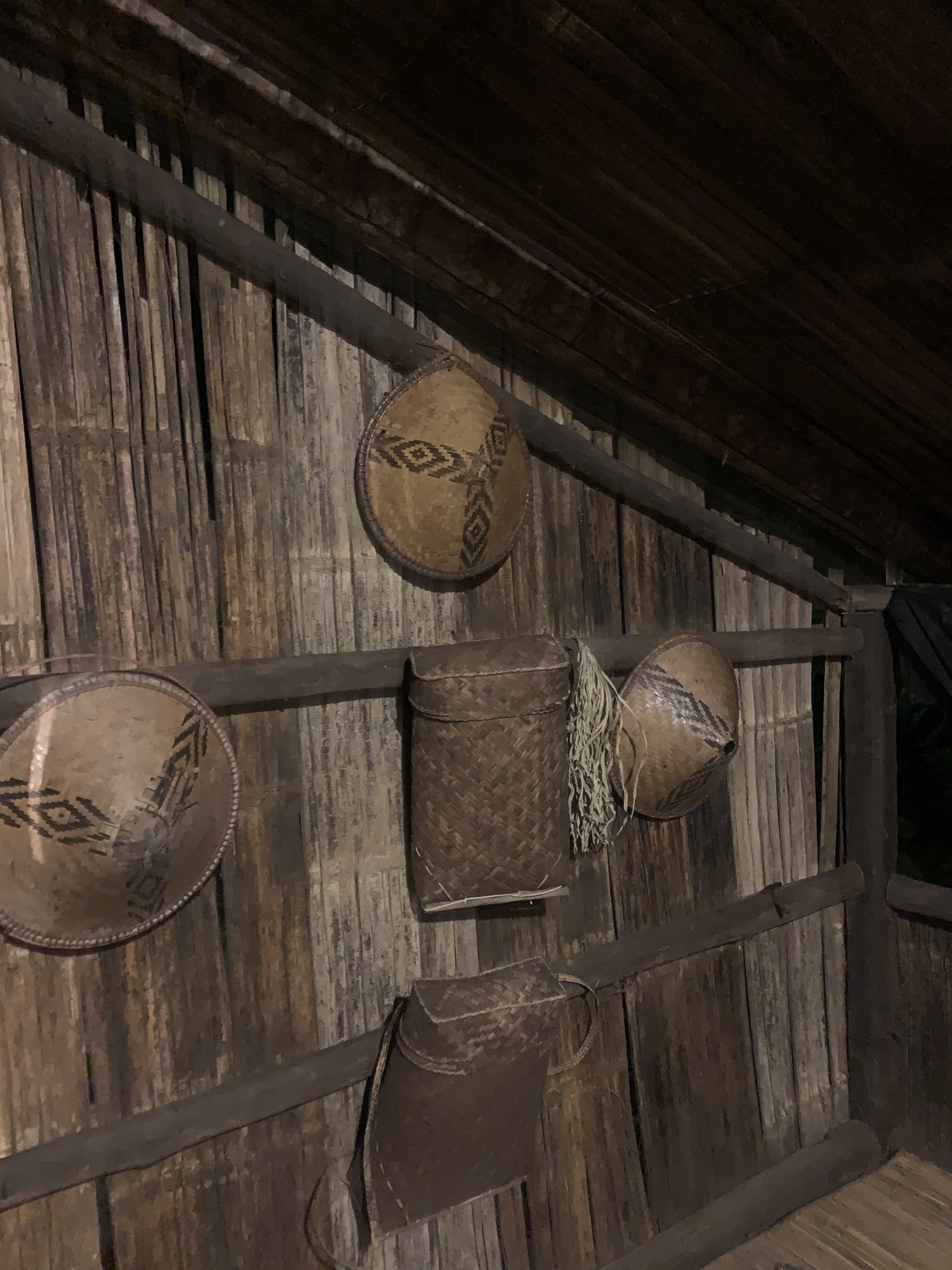
Clockwise from top right: Musala, handwoven of Tobilung Dusun, sirung which is the traditional hat of the Dusuns, and karo which is the traditional necklace of Lotud Dusun

The Labuk Dusun are known for gosing (floral embroidery) and mongorinda les Labuk (Labuk crocheted lace), both of which are part of the traditional attire that forms the Sabung Labuk (both male and female). Each embroidery detail and colour choice has its own meaning with the embroidery in the shape of the letter "V" from the waist to the shoulder level symbolises kopiiso ginavo (understanding and agreement that became the basis for the progress of the Labuk Dusun community). The colours of blue and green are different, which are called otomou. The Sabung Labuk is further equipped with traditional accessories such as kambot and simpagot (belts), simbong (earrings), kalung (necklace), and golong sulau (bracelet). The Minokok Dusun known for their 100 years "Morindon Naa'Vol'" dress, usually worn in important ceremonies such as magavau, magandavai, weddings, and thanksgiving ceremonies. The dress woven using white gapas (cotton thread), then dyed using natural dyes from plants called taum and decorated with giring (bell), tipai (button), and ramboi (bead). The Tatana Dusun are known by their traditional dress of Sira Lambung (female) and Sira Dambia (male). The colour is black, and the clothes are long sleeves for both genders.

=== Handicrafts ===
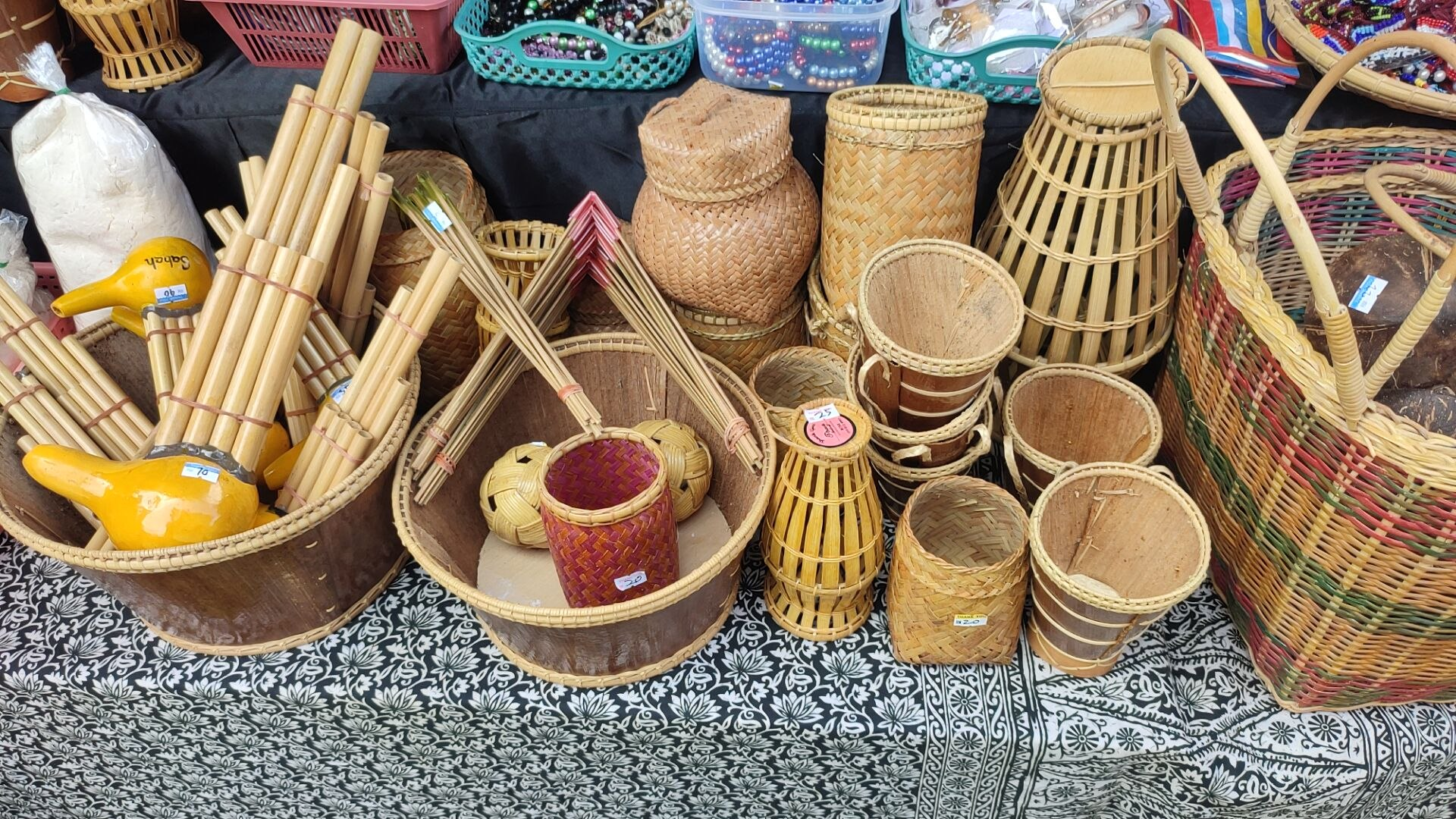
Various handicrafts produced by the Dusuns, including musical instrument

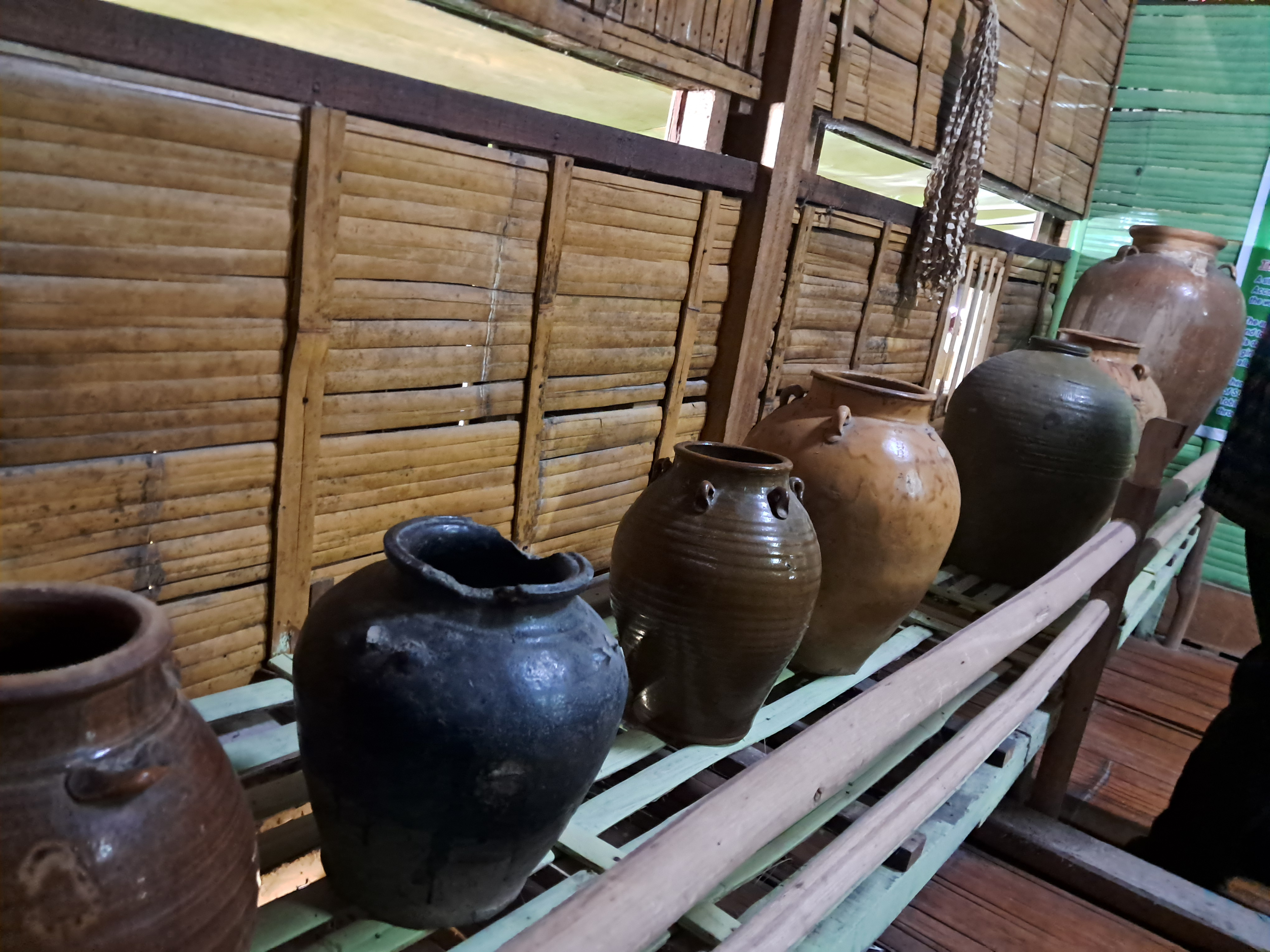
Various tajau (pottery) of the Dusuns

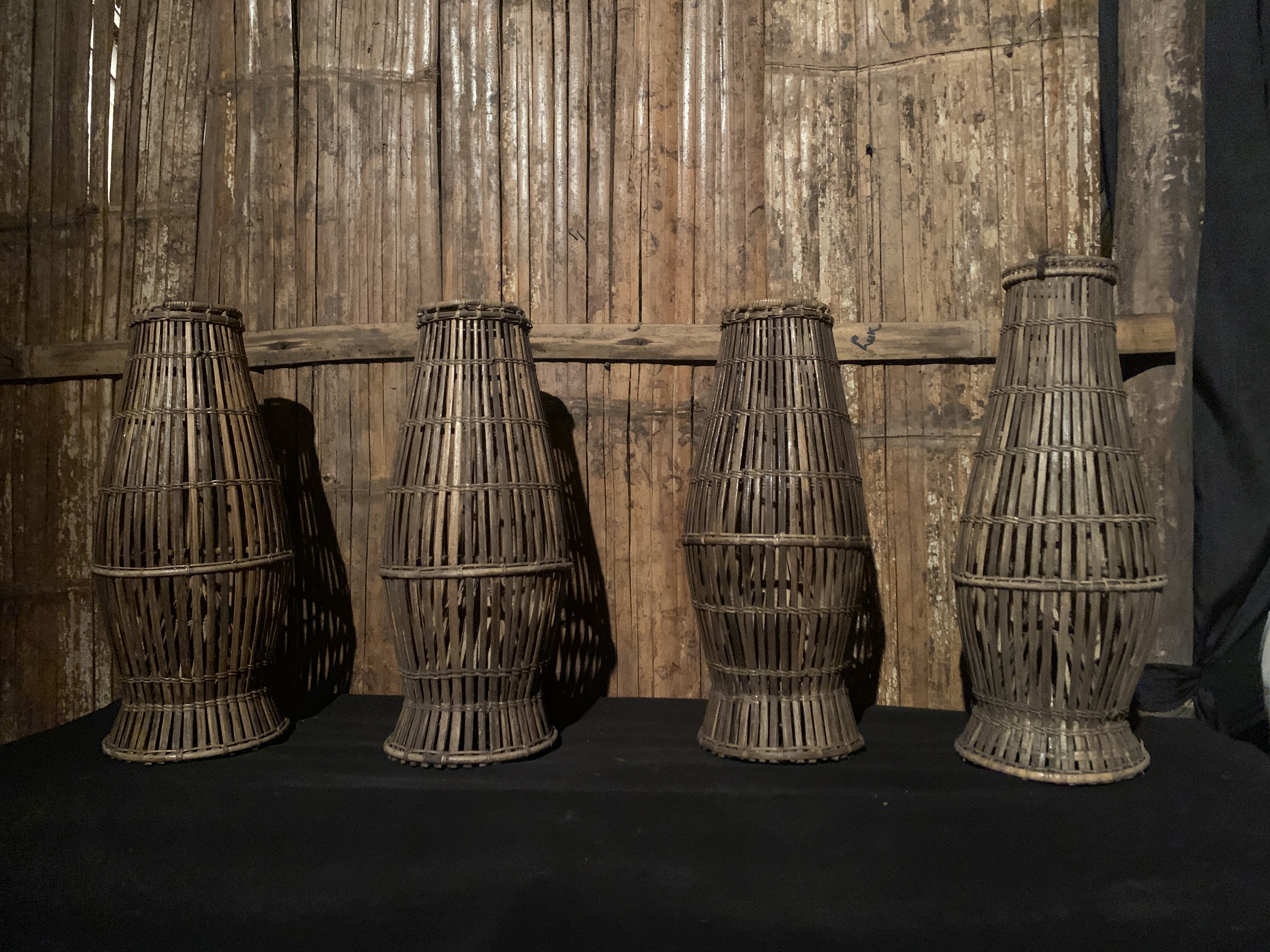
The Bubu is used by the Dusuns to catch fishes

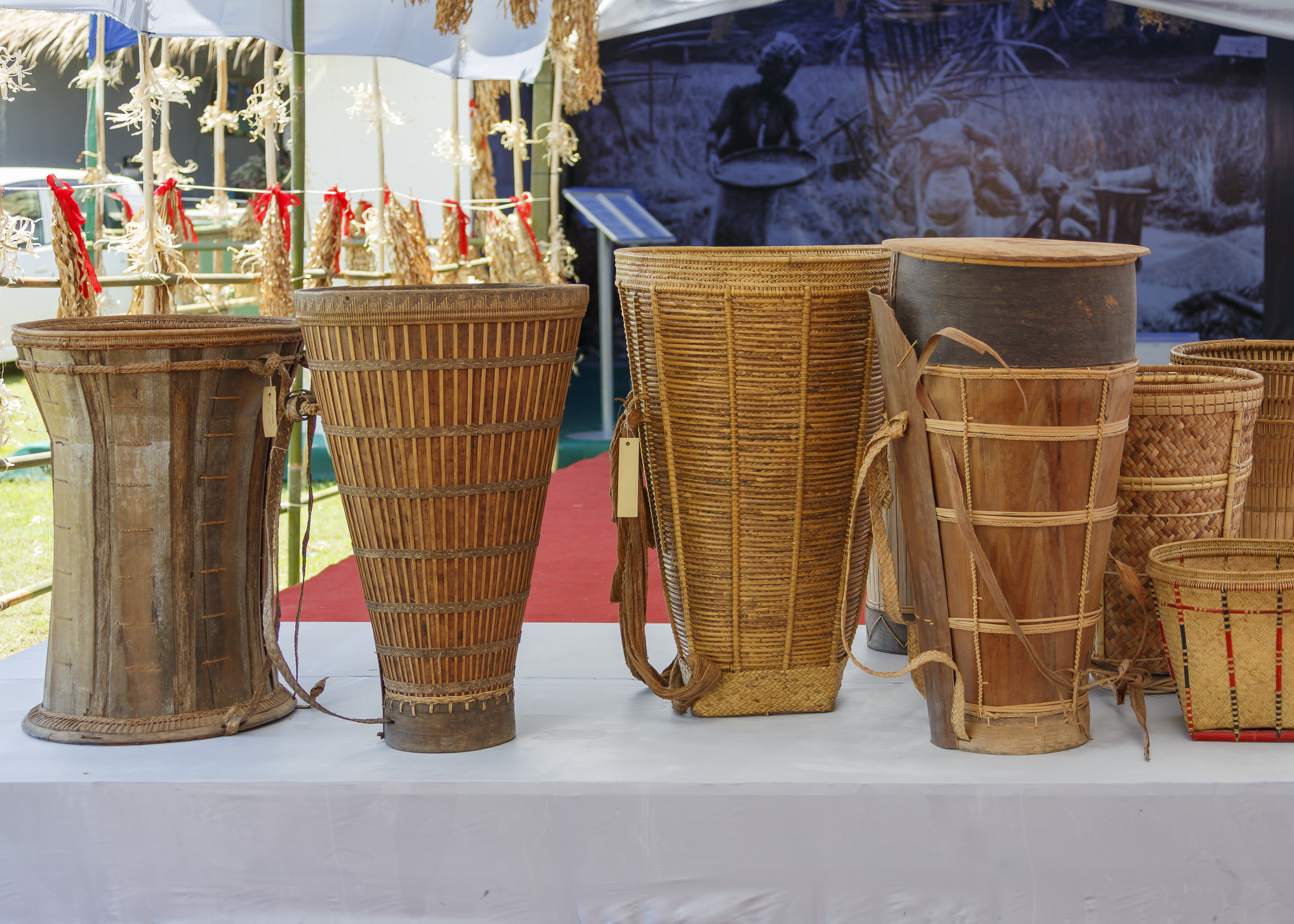
Various types of Dusun baskets based on different subgroups

Dusuns use natural materials as resources in the production of various tinunturu (handicrafts), including bamboo, rattan, donax canniformis (bemban or lias), calabash, and wood. Some of the many handicrafts that are identified within the Dusun community are barait/basung/wakid (traditional bag), sompoton (mouth organ), and gayang (parang machete). Before the advent of many of the present-day tools, many of the traditional tools were used in the daily lives of the indigenous Dusuns. The traditional basket bags are used to carry harvested crops from their farms, while the machetes are used as part of farming and hunting tools, as well as weapons in a series of civil wars among the Dusuns in the past, especially throughout the headhunting period. The traditional baskets were once used in the past by indigenous men to hold human heads that were being hunted, while the women carried very large baskets to fill with forest produce harvested in the fields. The indigenous Dusuns are also known for their tajau (pottery), which in the past was used mainly as coffins, apart from wedding and ritual ceremonies, such as by the Tindal Dusun of Kota Belud.

=== Traditional dances ===
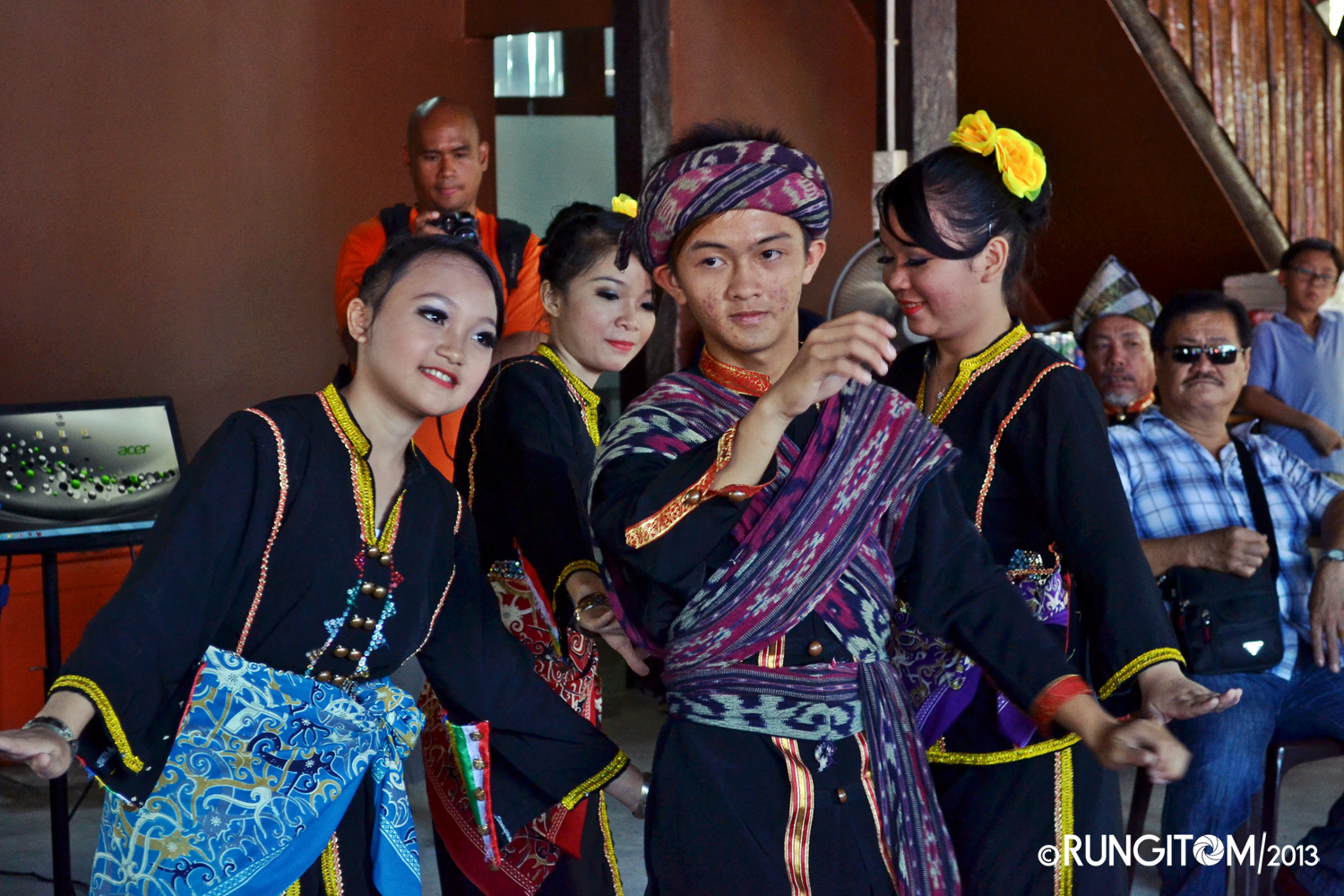
Sayau Moginum of Tatana Dusun from Kuala Penyu District

There are several traditional dances associated with the Dusuns based on different subgroups, such as magarang of the Liwan Dusun of Tambunan District, and modtomu sumirid (Kundasang Valley) and sumirid medtemu of the Liwan Dusun of Ranau District, sumirid lohobon of Gobukon Dusun of Kota Marudu District, botumban of Tagahas Dusun of Kiulu, Tuaran District, and pansok manamparai of Tagahas Dusun of Kota Marudu, Papar, and Penampang districts, the pinakang of Kimaragang Dusun of Kota Marudu and Pitas districts, sayau moginum and bakanjar of the Tatana Dusun of Kuala Penyu District, sumayau of the Lotud Dusun of Tuaran District, mongigol rinagang for the Tindal Dusun, and manaradan and mongigol tobilung for Tobilung Dusun of Kota Belud, Kota Marudu and Kota Kinabalu districts, and mongigol mangalai for the Tinagas Dusun of Ranau, Telupid, Beluran, and Kota Marudu districts, magunatip of Kujau (Kwijau) Dusun, mansayau of Nabaai Dusun, and sumayau of Gana Dusun of Keningau District. sirid-sirid, sumirid or sirid karamazan of Minokok Tompizos Dusun of Tongod and Keningau districts, and magalai labuk of Labuk Dusun of Beluran, Ranau, Sandakan and Telupid districts. The Kadazan sumazau dance are generally referred to as sumayau by the Dusuns. Among the Kimaragang Dusun, their traditional dance is called mongigol (men) and magandak (women) and the name of their music is pinakang with traditional instrument such as tagung (agung in Murut) and gabang kayu (xylophone). The Tinagas Dusun are known for their mongigol mangalai dance and various gong instrument sounds such as the borotinduk, gouting, sontuk toomod and solundoi.

=== Traditional music ===
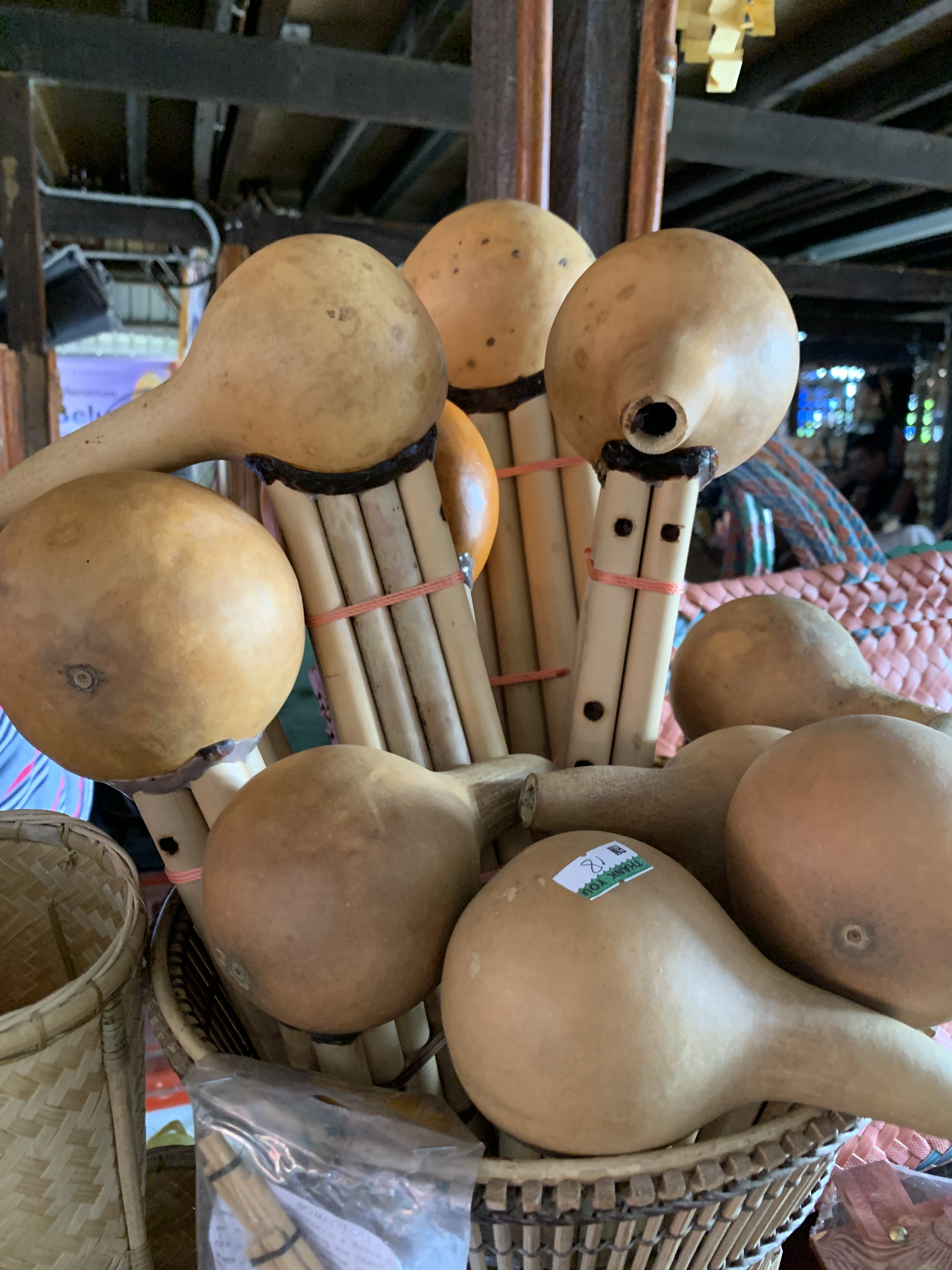
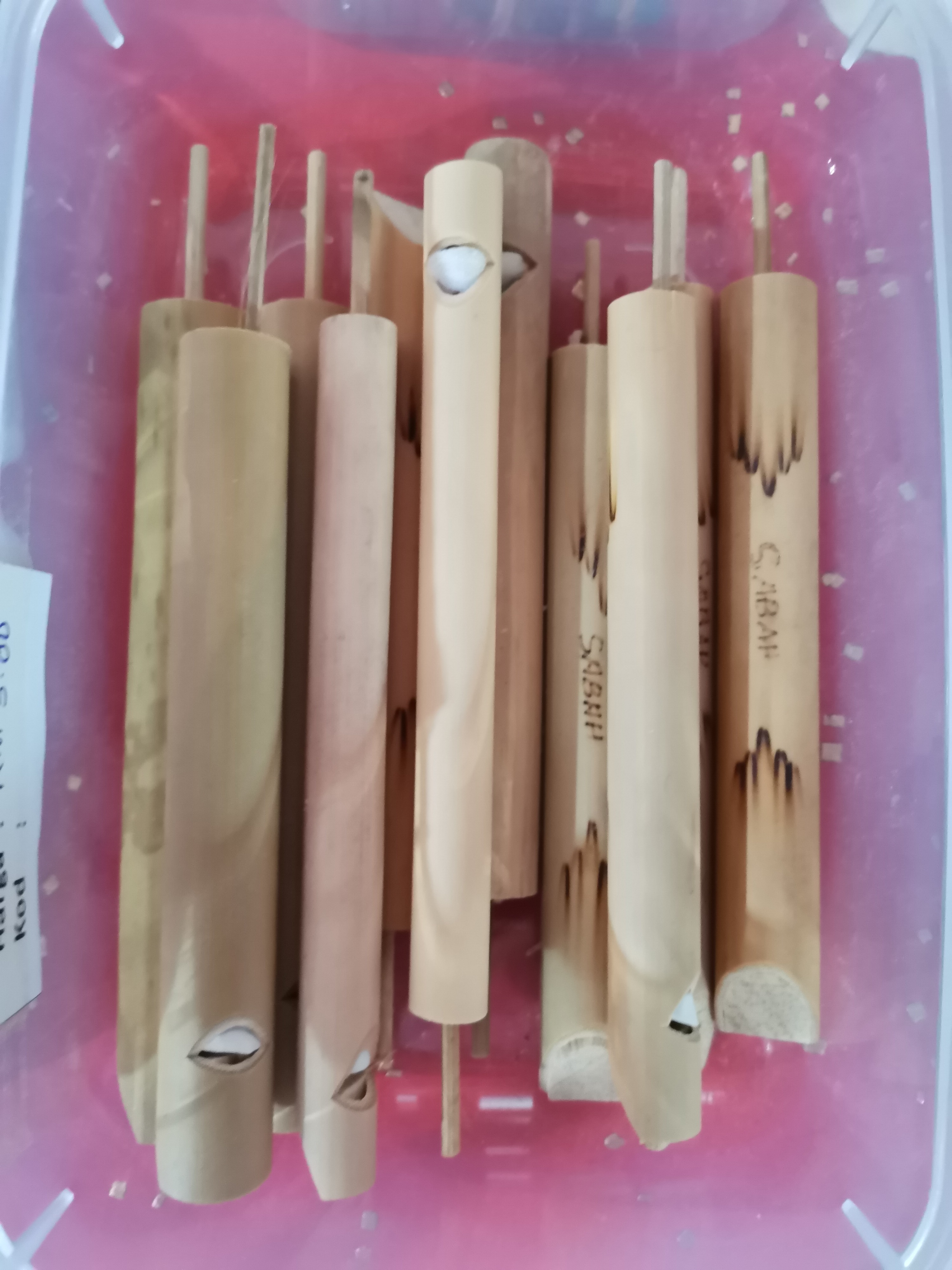
The sompoton and turali of the Dusuns are part of the main musical instruments of Sabah

The music of the Dusuns is usually orchestrated in the form of a band consisting of musicians using traditional musical instruments, such as the bamboo flute of sompoton, the togunggak, the gong, and the kulintangan. Musical instruments in Sabah are classified into chordophones (consisting of gagayan or sundatang, tongkungon, and the Arabian-influenced gambus), aerophones (consisting of bungkau, suling, turali or tuahi, and sompoton), idiophones (gong, kulintangan, togunggak, and turuding), and membranophones (consisting of gendang, kompang, or tontog). The most common musical instruments in Dusun ceremonies are the gong and kulintangan. The gong beat usually varies by region and district based on each of the Dusun subgroups. Art music and dance from Kimaragang Dusun is different from the other Dusun sub-tribes because of its softer, melodic and harmonic melody. There are also classic literary names of bo'or, rina'at and sunda'at with singing called tabai insi and todindot. The Tatana Dusun of Kuala Penyu District are known for their traditional ginda song, consisting of a total of 32 ginda, which is one of the main traditional songs of the Tatana Dusun, apart from badaup, bolibag, boluai, mibobogo, and nandong, that are used during ritual ceremonies to interact with supernatural beings. The Dusun ethnic music is currently being preserved and promoted through various methods, including the nurturing of younger generations with traditional instrument skills and the promotion of Dusun music on modern major music streaming platforms.

=== Religion ===
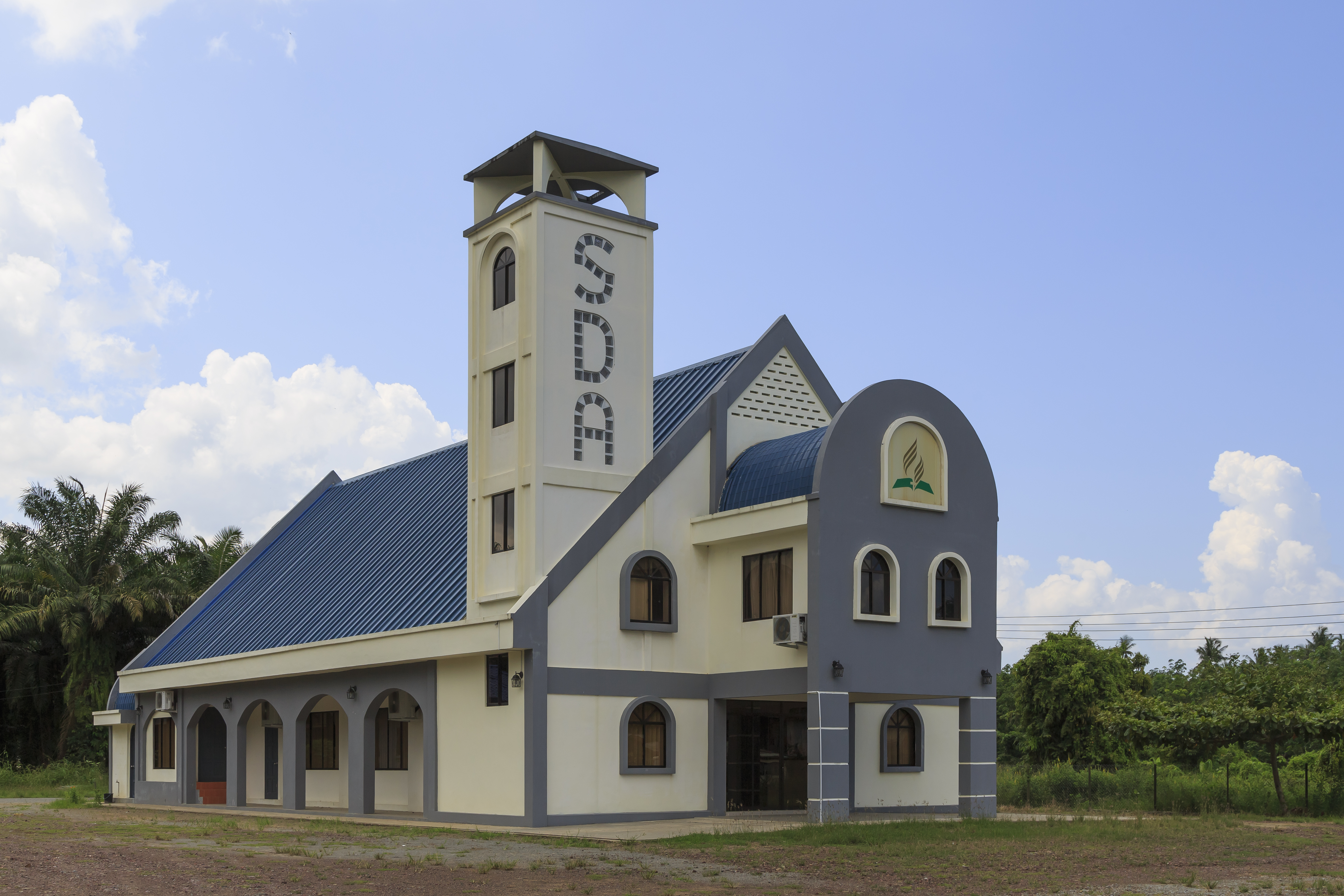
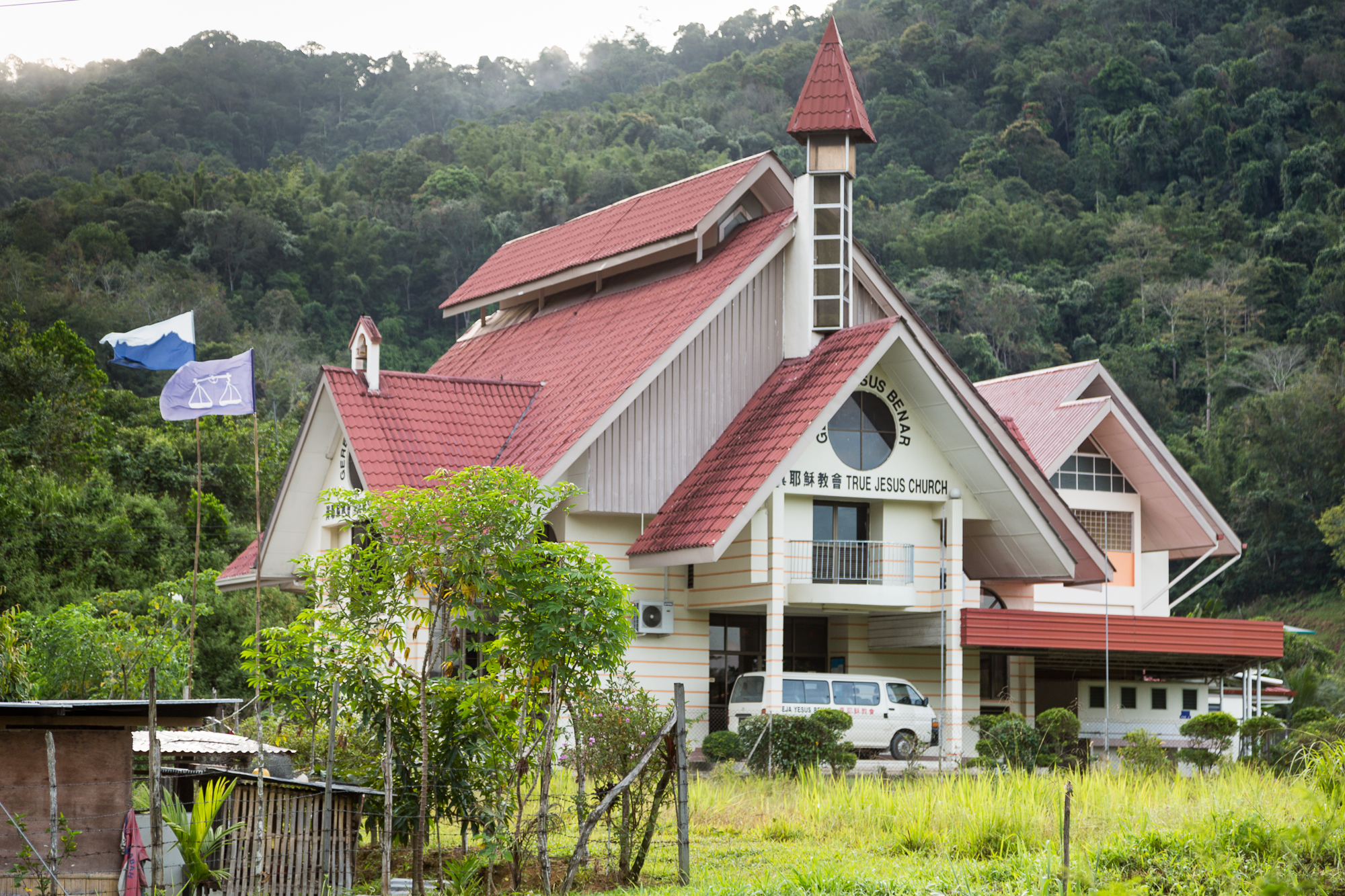
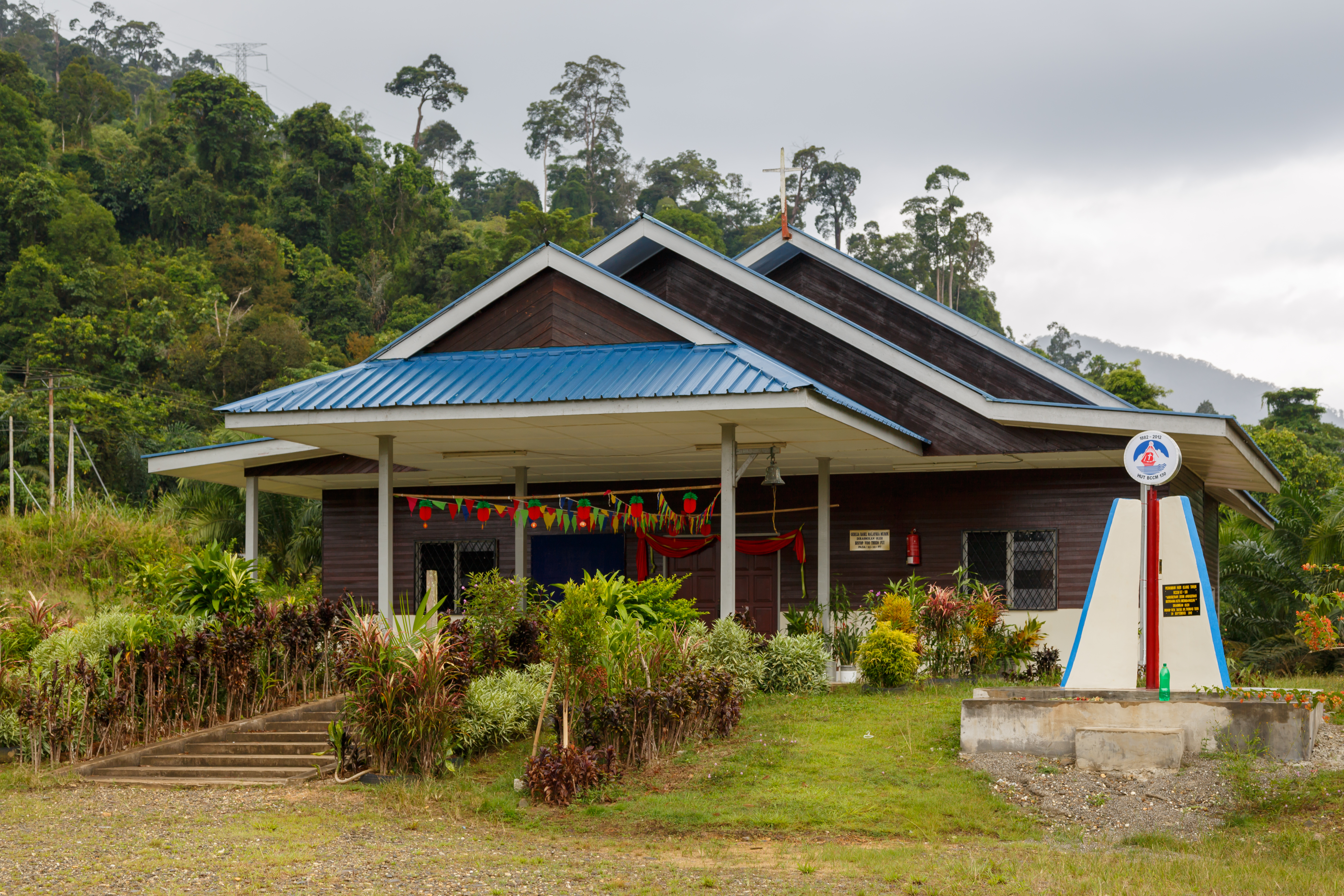
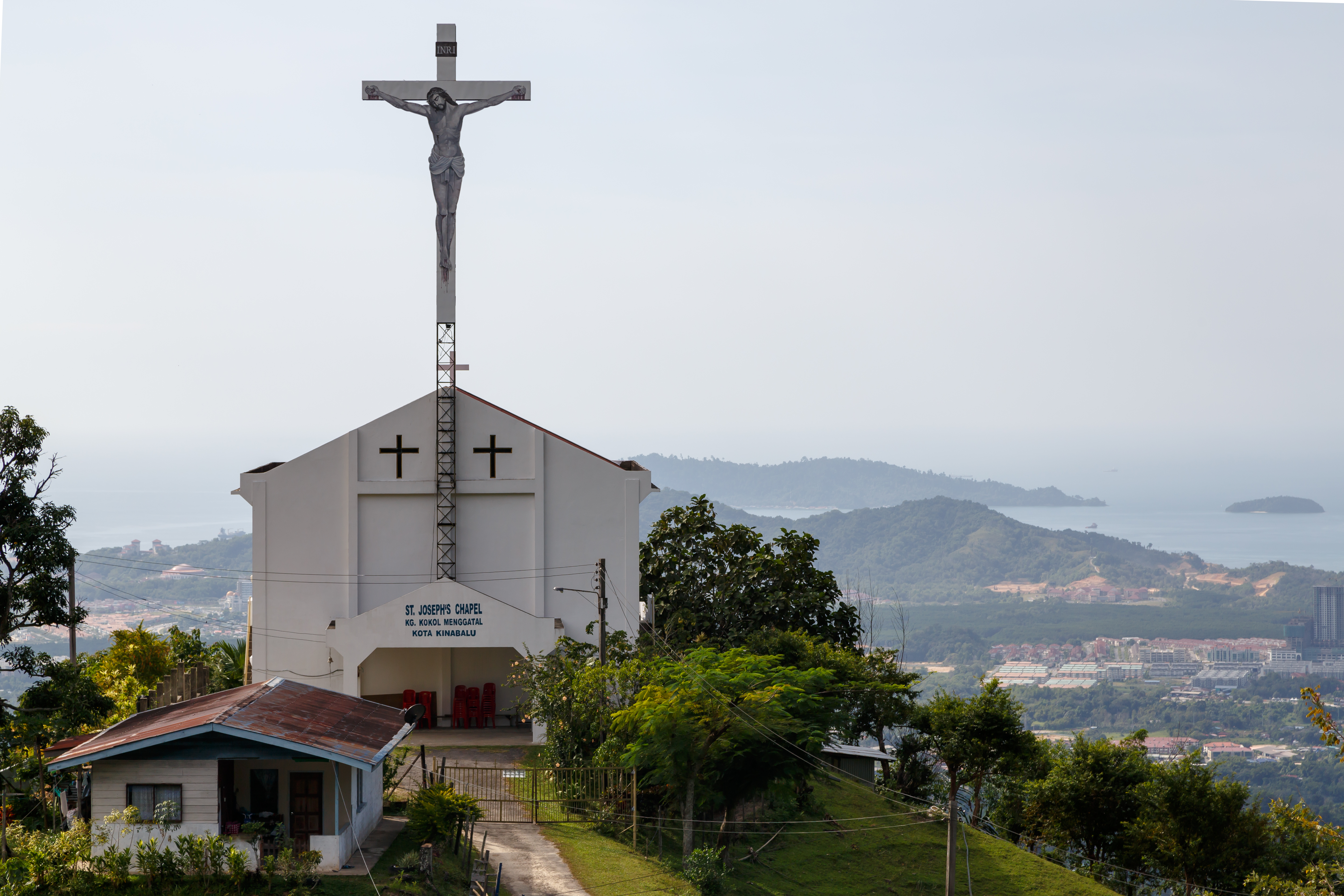
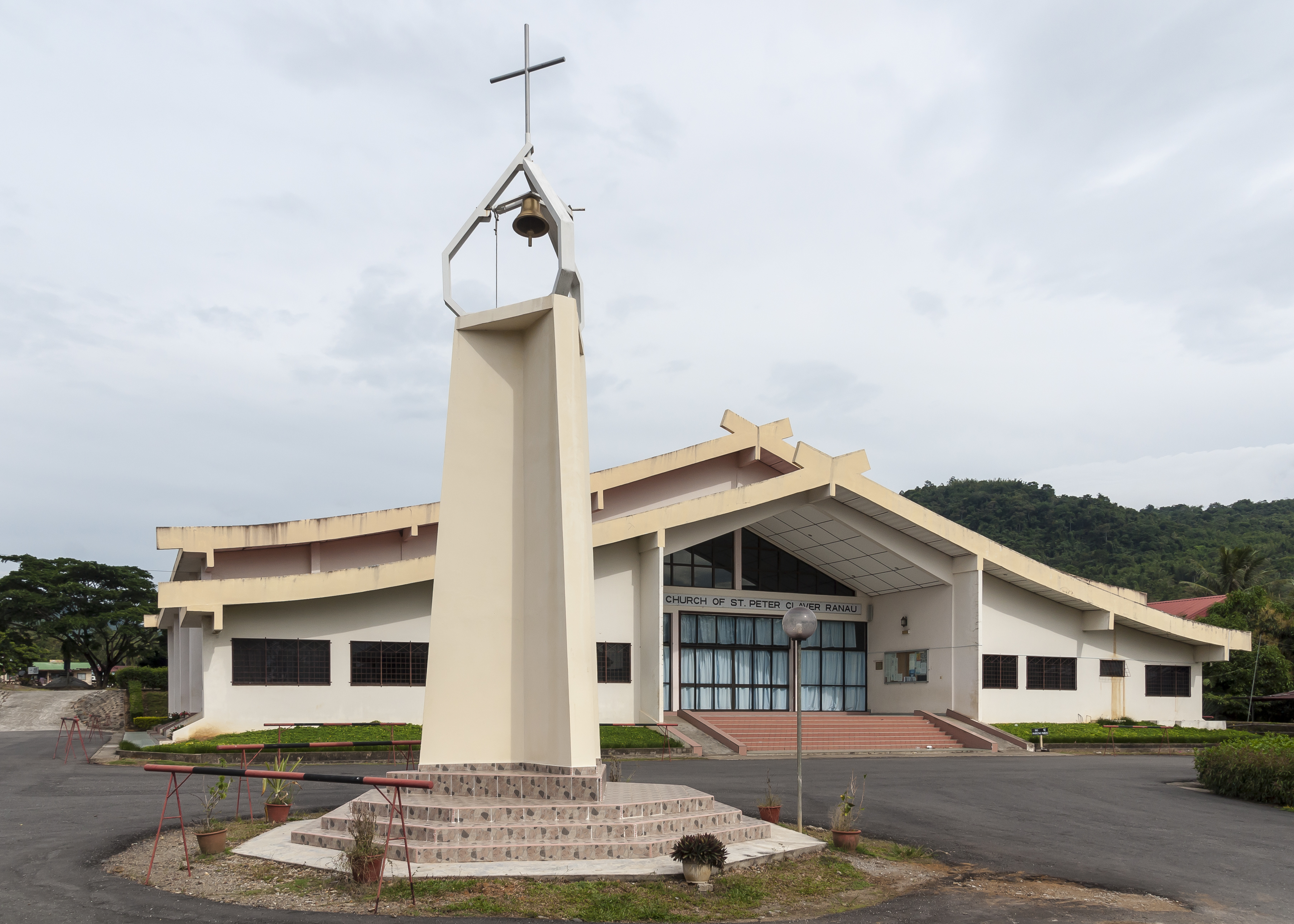
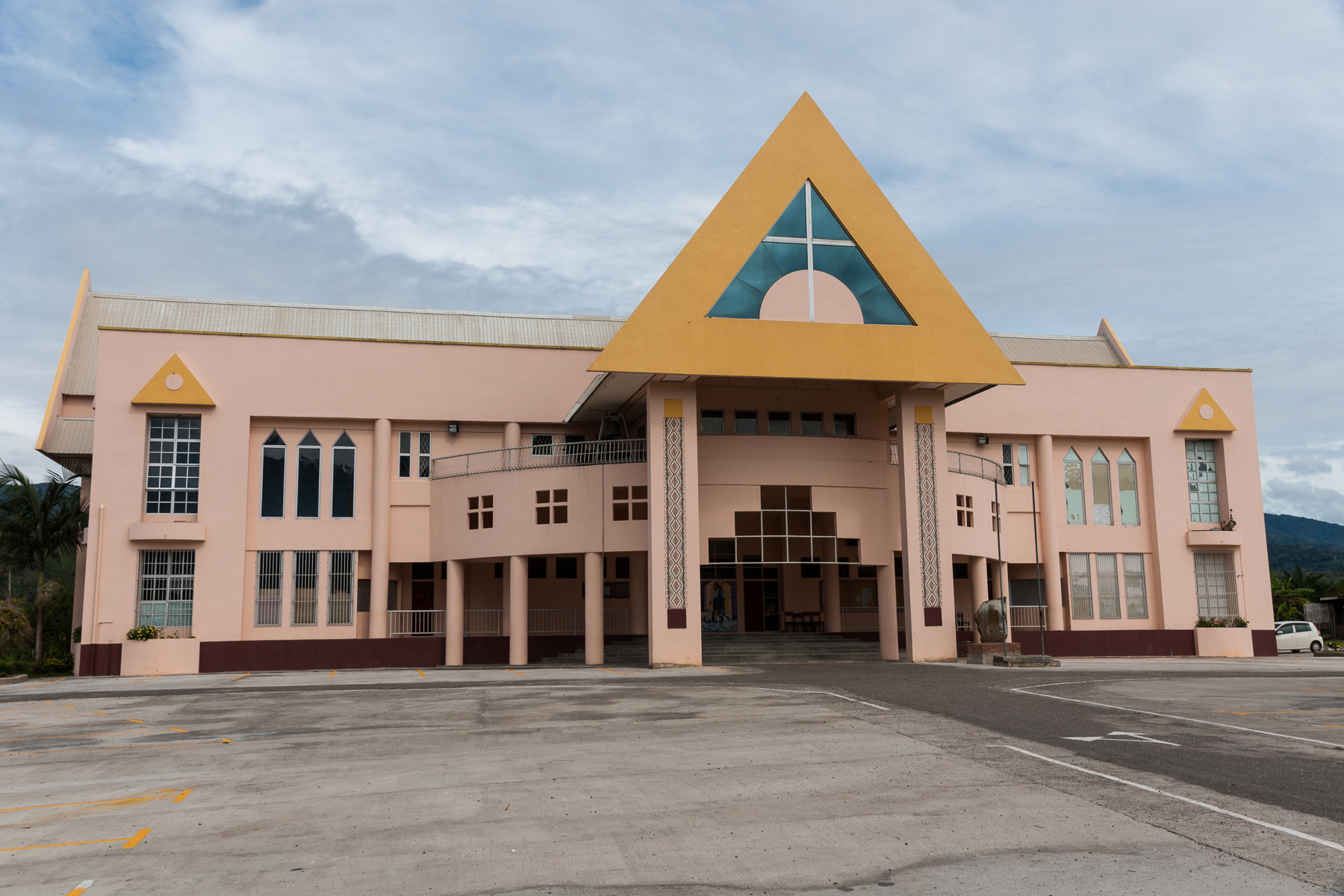
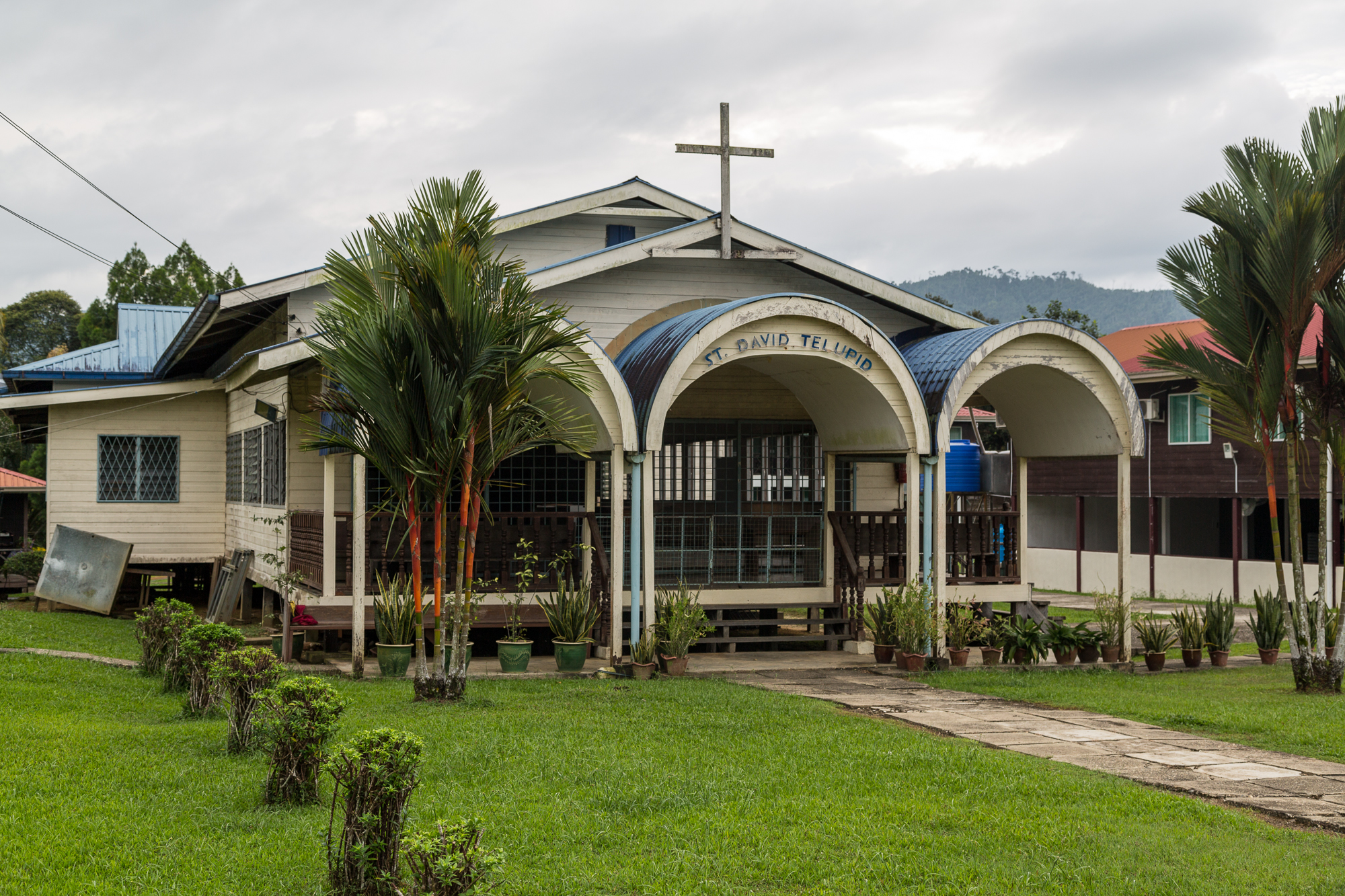
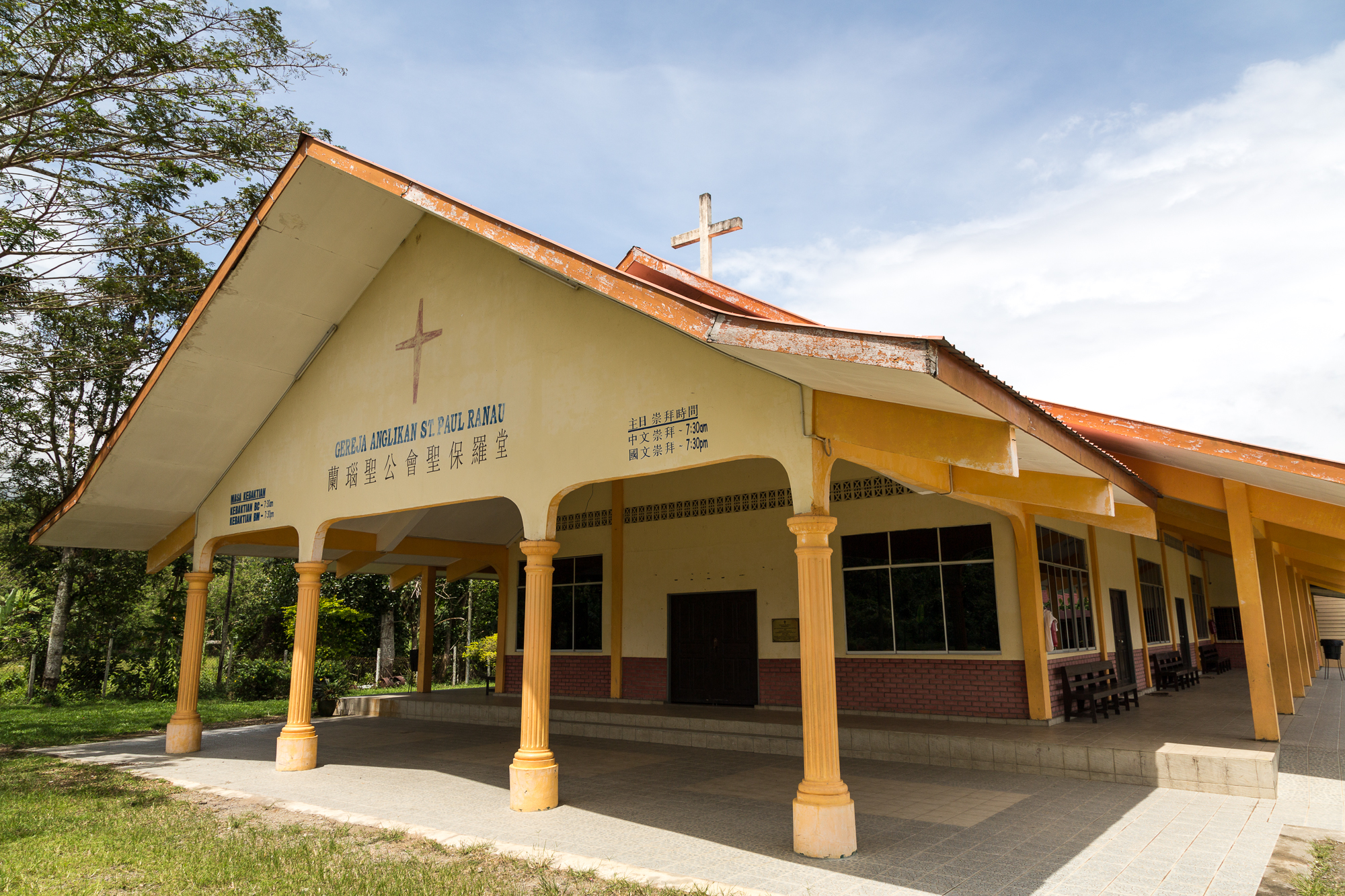
From clockwise: True Jesus Church in Tamparuli of Tuaran District, St Joseph Chapel Catholic Church, Menggatal of Kota Kinabalu District, St Peter Claver Catholic Church of Ranau District, Holy Cross Catholic Church of Tambunan District, St David Anglican Church of Telupid District, St Paul Anglican Church of Ranau District, Basel Church in Murok Village of Telupid District, and Seventh-day Adventist Church in Goshen Village of Kota Marudu District. Various denominations of different branches within the Dusun community's major religion of Christianity.

Before the introduction of Abrahamic religions among the Dusuns, they adhered to a form of Animist-Pagan religion of Momolianism (Traditional North Bornean religions). The God of the indigenous Dusuns are Minamangun (Bundu-Liwan Dusun: Kinorohingan; Tangaah Kadazan: Kinoingan), with the Mount Kinabalu (Gayo Ngaran) as their sacred mountain as part of their cultural identity. Although a majority of the Dusuns have converted to Christianity and some to Islam, many still practise traditional rituals from their traditional beliefs. The arrival of British missionaries in the 1880s to North Borneo, particularly the Catholic Mill Hill Missionaries, led to significant religious and social change among the Dusuns, with the efforts resulting in a large majority of Dusuns converting to Roman Catholicism and Protestantism, which subsequently stimulated interest in community development through education and improved literacy. Various accounts and studies made by Christian missionaries until the 20th century provide important information about the indigenous Dusuns. The records by British researcher such as Ivor Hugh Norman Evans and British North Borneo government officer such as George Cathcart Woolley through his diaries, and various monographs and photographs provide most unbiased descriptions of the Dusuns. The Christian Dusuns also have their own translations of the Bible named as Buuk Do Kinorohingan - Habar dot Osonong, produced by the ethnic Dusun itself and published by the Bible Society of Malaysia.

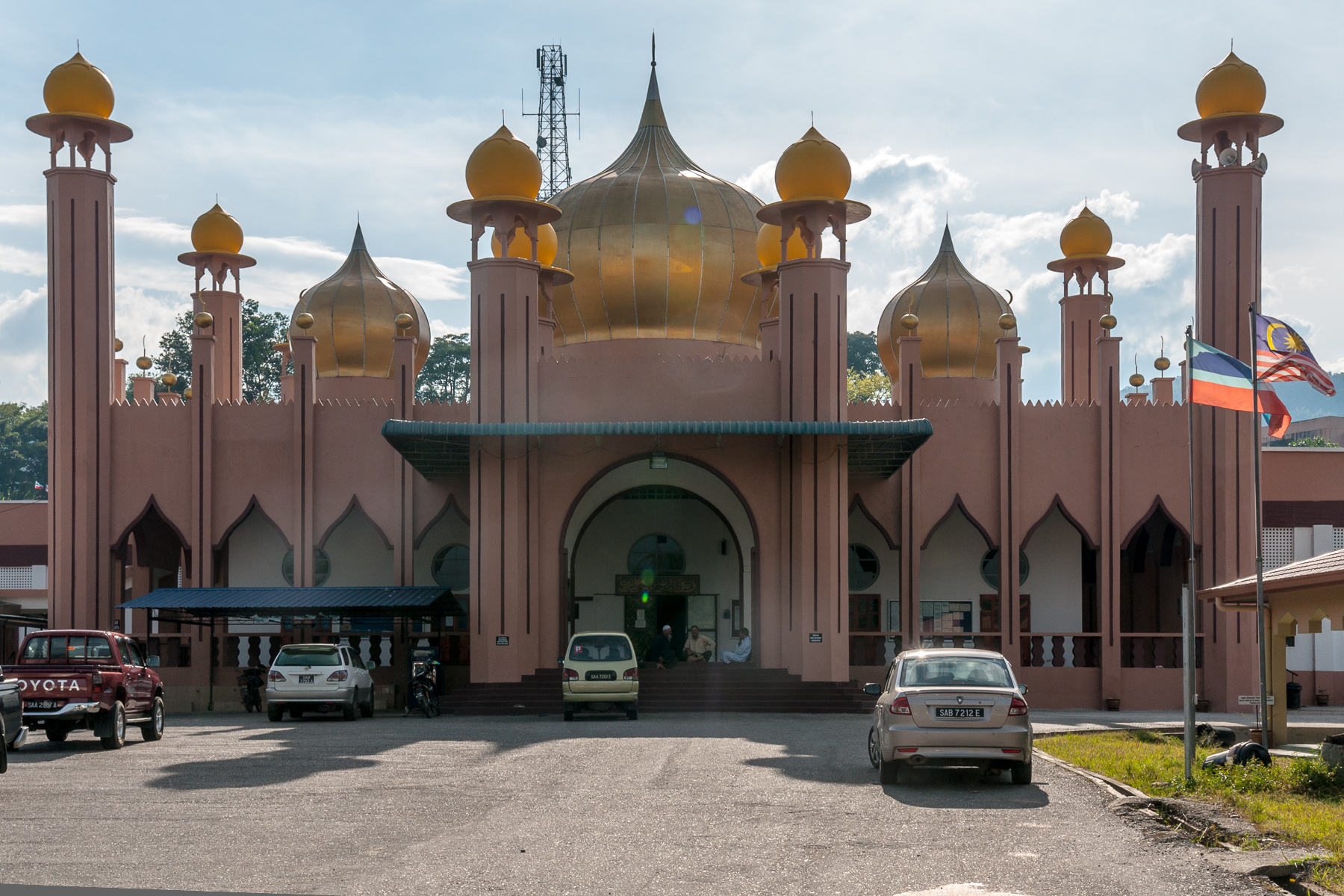
Ranau Town Mosque of Ranau District, a mosque in the inland Dusun town

A significant number of Dusuns in the Ranau District, especially in Ratau Village, learnt Islam through a Muslim traditional healer from Java, Indonesia, who was not a preacher by profession, resulting in the converted Dusuns having their own view of Islam, which evolved from a gentle Dusun culture that subsequently created a harmonious bond with their fellow non-Muslim Dusun counterparts. The presence of Muslim missionaries from the neighbouring country of Indonesia was massive throughout the USNO administrations, which resulted in the conversion of many Dusuns in the interior, apart from their interracial marriage with majority Muslim ethnic groups such as the Bajaus, Bisaya, and the Bruneian Malays. The Muslim Dusuns also have their own translations of the Quran produced by the Kadazan Dusun Murut Muslim Organisation (KDMRS Muslim). In the present day, the already harmonious religious relations among the Dusuns of Ranau District practised since the 1960s were, however, threatened by the more recent radical Islamic view from West Malaysia starting in the 2000s, under which the Ranau Dusuns' view of Islam is being labelled under the pretext of "distorted Islamic views", even though the teachings have become the key to harmonious relations between the local Christian-Muslim Dusuns community that has remained for a significant amount of time in the area. As a result, an official enactment law has been passed and gazetted by the Sabah government since 2017 to immediately ban various deviant Islamic teachings that attempt to influence the region's residents with intolerant ideologies, to protect its indigenous community by preventing religious radicalisation, as well as rising Islamophobia caused by the intolerant teachings of the deviant section.

The traditionalist Dusuns are also known for their Adat, a local indigenous law fitted with the religious value system that is part of social life that has been recognised by the Native Court of Sabah, with aims to maintain peace with the indigenous, resolve conflicts, ease tensions, and impose compensation for any customary violations in Sabah. One such law that is part of the sogit (local Adat law) is the tagal (conservation system) system that is used by the indigenous Dusuns on their territory to conserve rivers and aquatic life by imposing fines on intruders, including to those outside of Dusun ethnics.

=== Language ===
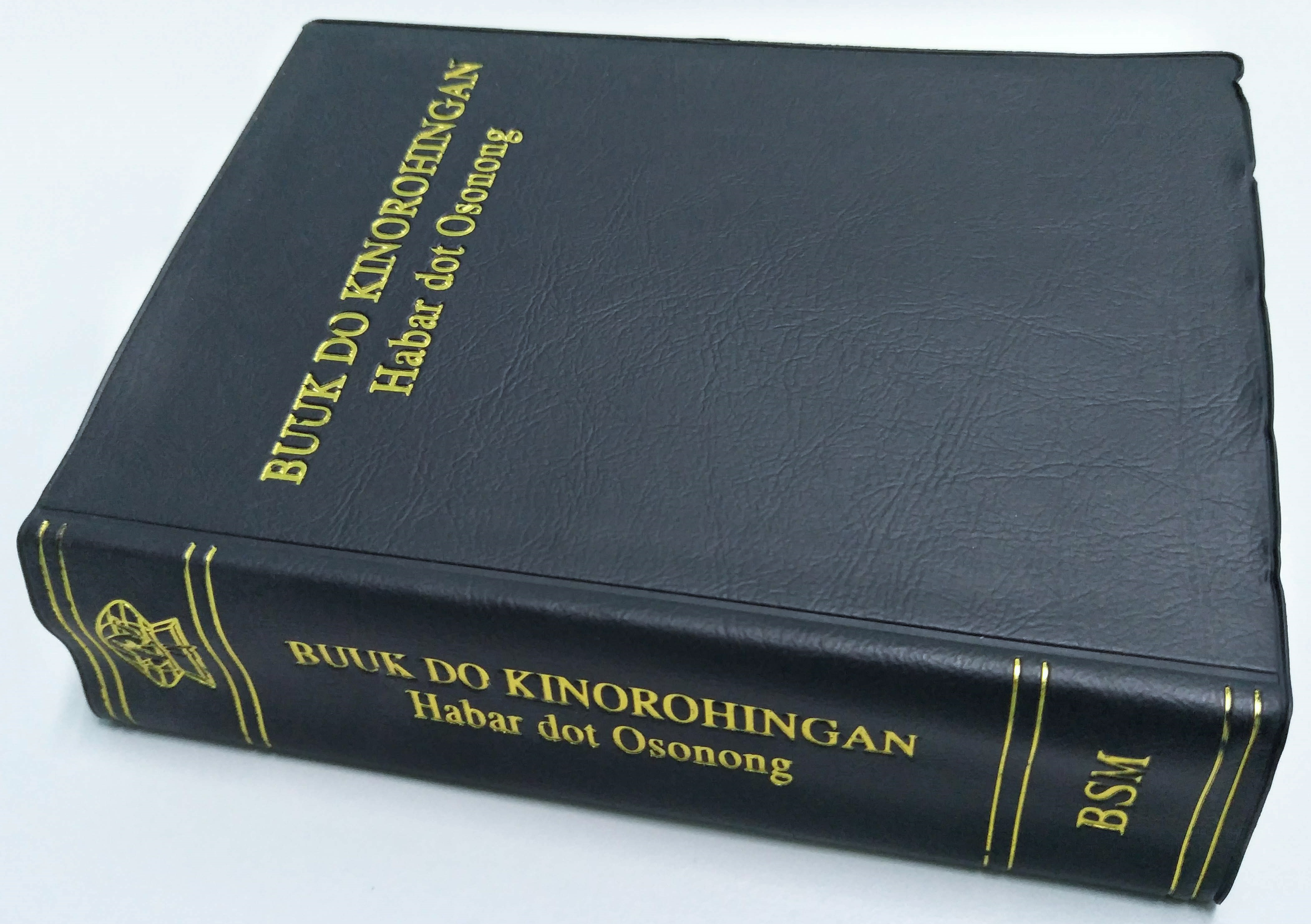
A Bible translation in Dusun-Kadazan, the Buuk do Kinorohingan

The Dusun dialect is the main language between the different Dusunic sub-ethnic which consisting further classification between different Dusun subgroups. The Dusuns are distinguished from the Kadazans, especially through their "r", "w", and "y" dialect, whereas the Kadazans commonly use the "v", and "z" dialect. It consists of the main dialect of Central Dusun languages with other Dusunic dialects of Kimaragang, Garo, Kuala Monsok, Minokok and Tempasuk, where the language, together with the Kadazan language, is the mother tongue of the majority of indigenous people in Sabah. Some Dusun languages, such as the Kimaragang Dusun of northeastern Sabah, also share some close vowel harmony with the Timugon Murut of Tenom District, which is one of the dialects within the large grouping of Murut languages, with both Dusunic and Murutic languages being closely related in vocabulary, phonological and grammatical similarities. The Dusun, Kadazan, and Rungus languages, together with the Muruts, also share some similarities with the languages of the Philippines, such as Tagalog.

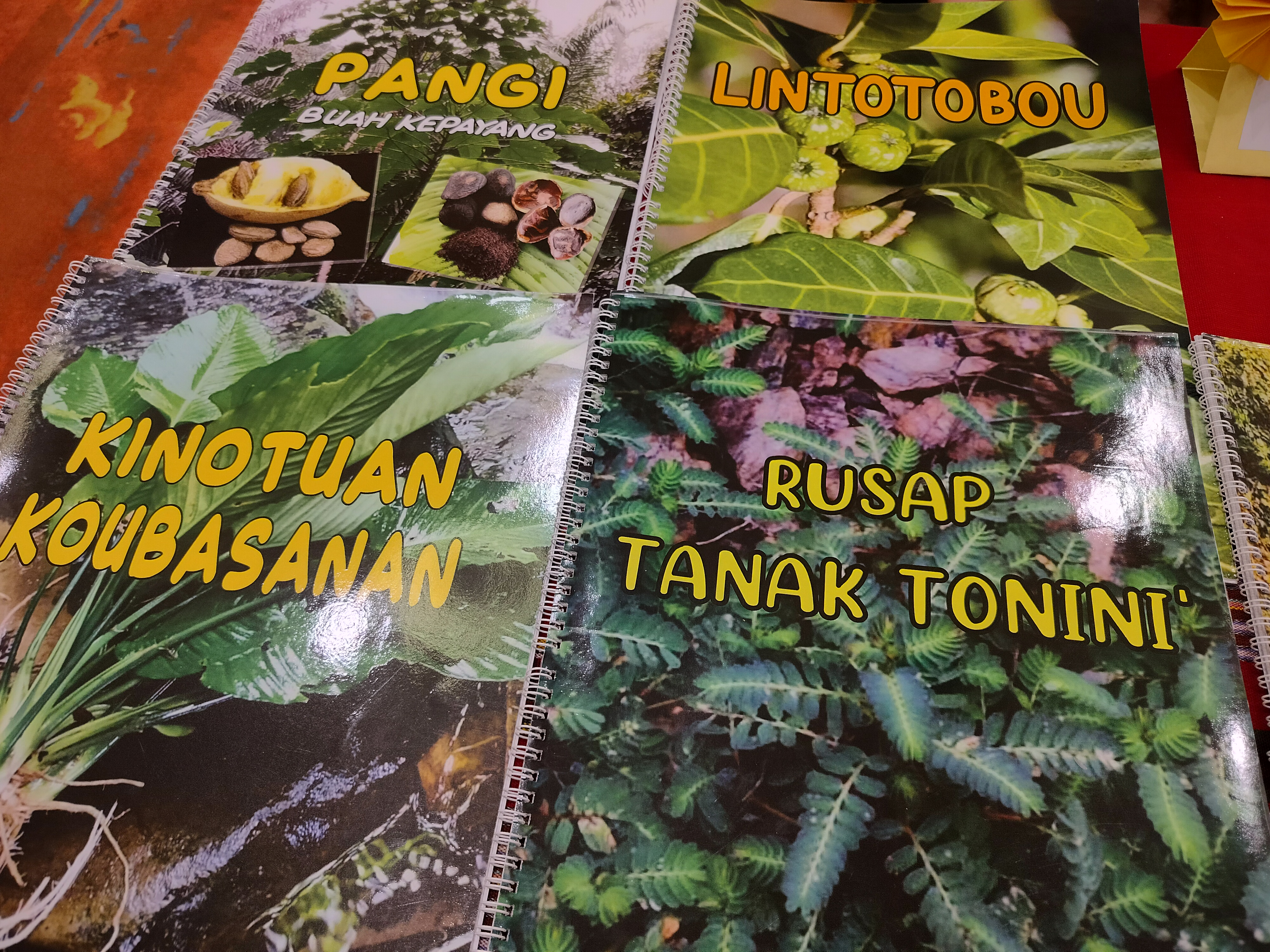
Books of Kadazan (left) and Dusun (right) herbal plants in the native languages

The use of the language has been declining due to the use of Malay by the Malaysian federal government and the use of English by missionaries, which was done through the method of language shift enforced by the work of both the colonial and federal governments. Several language preservation policies have been initiated by the government of Sabah to prevent the continuous decline, which is also happening to other groups of indigenous languages of Sabah. By the 2020s, the Dusun language, together with the Kadazan language, has become part of the national education curriculum and is taught in both primary and secondary schools in Sabah. In 2025, a proposal to expand the teaching of the Kadazan-Dusun languages subject in schools to include four other ethnic languages comprising the Tatana Dusun language of Kuala Penyu, Tangaa Kadazan of Penampang, Timugon Murut of Tenom and Lotud Dusun of Tuaran was submitted to the federal government of Malaysia. Some initiatives have also been taken by the Sabah Dusunic Language Preservation Association (KBDS) to teach the younger generations from an early age and revitalise the Dusunic language.

== Indigenous status ==
Being indigenous to Sabah and within the federation of Malaysia, the Dusun are conferred the same political, educational and economic rights as the predominant Malay population of Malaysia. The term ascribed to this is "Bumiputera" (from Sanskrit "bhumiputra"), a Malay word which translates to "sons of the land". Presently, the Dusun are associated with another similar indigenous tribe - the Kadazan, and various other indigenous peoples, under the blanket term Kadazan-Dusun. This is officially recognised as the result of political machinations, specifically a resolution of the 5th KCA (Kadazan Cultural Association, which was then renamed to Kadazan-Dusun Cultural Association (KDCA)) Delegates Conference held between 4 and 5 November 1989. It was decided as the best alternative approach to resolve the two identity crisis that had crippled and impeded the growth and development of the Kadazan-Dusun multi-ethnic community socio-culturally, economically and politically – ever since "Kadazan versus Dusun" sentiments were politicised in the early 1960s. Many consider their traditional geographical influences as the major difference between the two ethnic groups since the Kadazans are mainly inhabitants of the flat valley deltas, conducive to paddy field farming, while Dusuns are traditionally inhabitants of the hilly and mountainous regions common to the interior of Sabah with terrace farming and known for their hill rice.

== See also ==
- Bornean traditional tattooing
- Dayak people, another unifying term for Bornean indigenous people used in neighbouring Sarawak and Kalimantan
- Paitan people, another classification term for Bornean indigenous people used in northeastern Sabah for Paitanic-speaking peoples
- Kadazan Dusun Cultural Association (KDCA)
