= Paitan people =

Indigenous ethnic group of Borneo

Paitan people Paitans
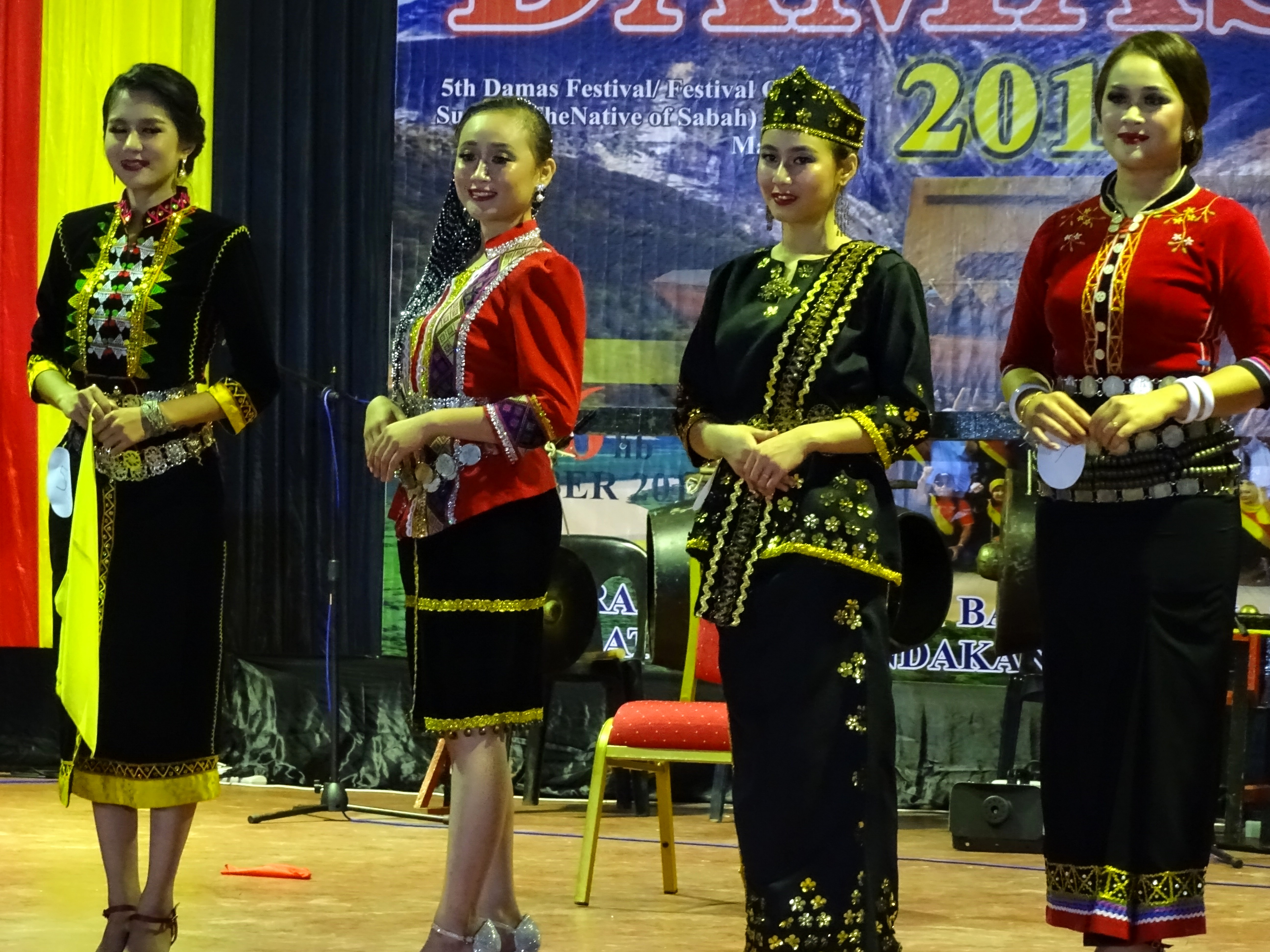
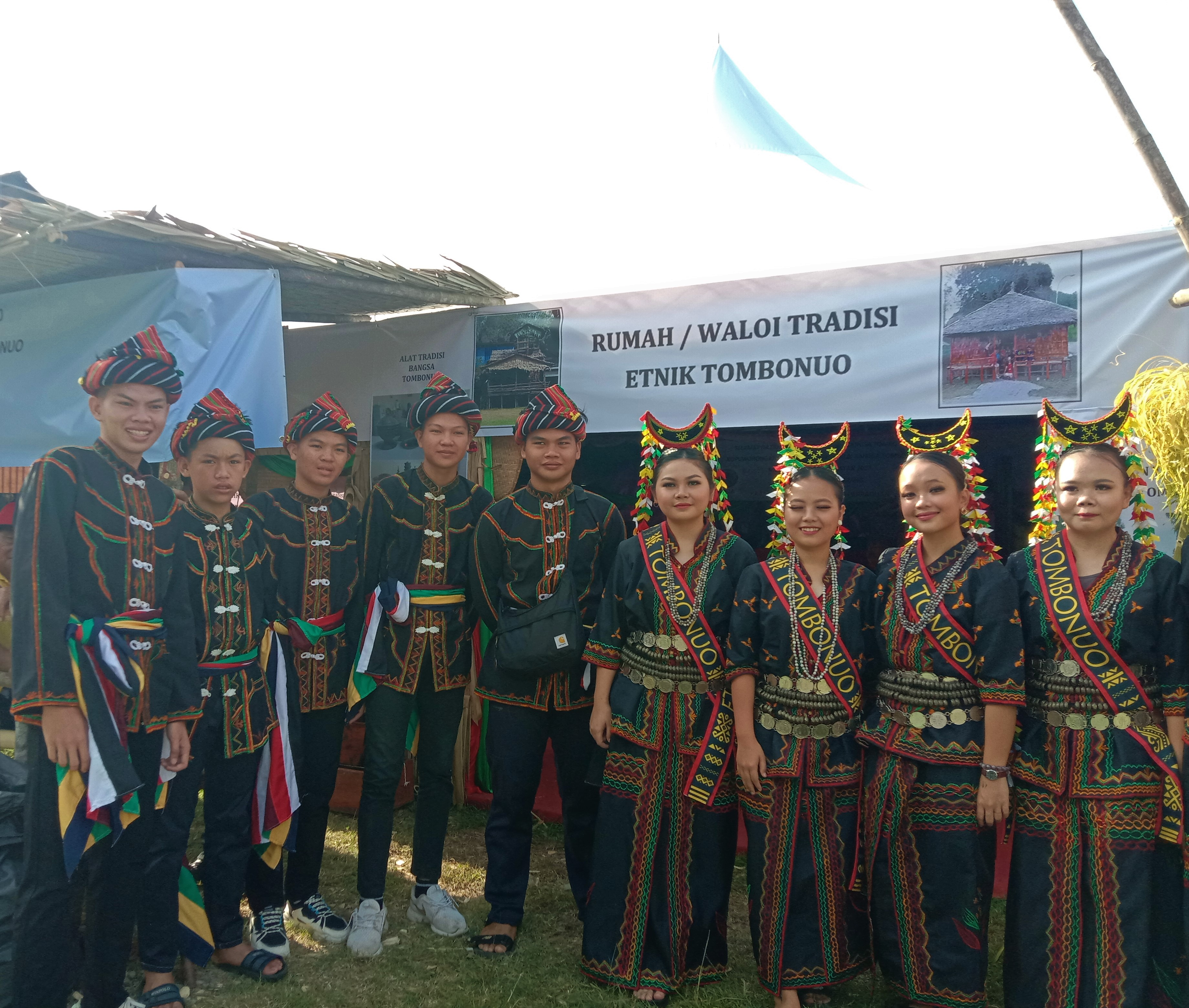
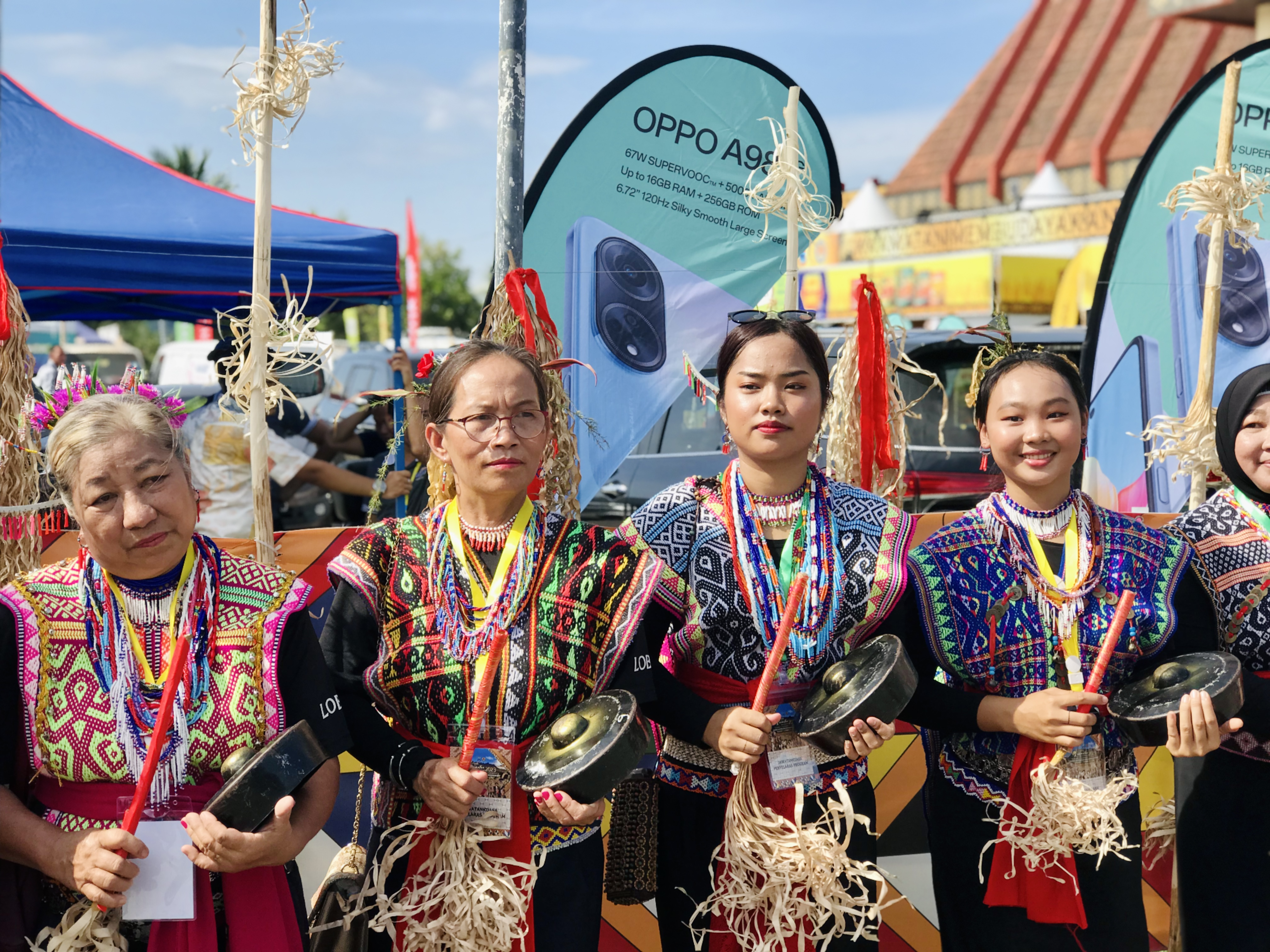
- From top: Orang Sungei of Paitan sub-district, Beluran as well as Kota Marudu districts, Tombonuo Dusun of Pitas District, and Lobu Dusun of Keningau and Ranau districts

Regions with significant populations
- Malaysia (Sabah)

Languages
- Native; Paitanic; Also; Sabah Malay • Standard Malay • English

Religion
- Islam (Sunni) (60%); Christianity (Catholic, Protestants) (30%), Animism (Traditional religion) (5%)

Related ethnic groups
- Paitanic related peoples; (Tombunuo; Orang Sungei; Rumanau); Kadazan-Dusun • Rungus • Ida'an • Bisaya • Dayak • Iban • Melanau • Lun Bawang/Dayeh • Murut • Kedayan • other Austronesian peoples

Paitan people or simply Paitans is the collective name of a number of ethnic groups indigenous to Sabah, Malaysia who speak Paitanic languages. They primarily live in Pitas, Lahad Datu, Beluran (Labuk-Sugut), Telupid, Kinabatangan, Kota Marudu, Sandakan as well as Tongod, and, to some extent, Keningau and Ranau districts. The group comprises the Orang Sungei (including the Buludupis), Tombonuo and several eastern Sabah Dusuns such as the Begak, Lobu (Rumanau), and Subpan. Within Malaysia, Paitans are considered Sabahan Bumiputera.

== Ethnic groups classified under the Paitan group ==
=== Orang Sungei/Sungai ===
The Orang Sungei (literally "river people"; also spelled Sungei) are one of the major indigenous groups of Sabah, located in the Beluran and Pitas districts in the northeast. While they have historically practised animism, most currently adhere to Sunni Islam. A majority of the Orang Sungei speak Paitanic languages. This group possess rich customs and a culture influenced by intermarriage with other indigenous ethnic groups that has contributed to the merging and evolution of their cultural elements. Some of their traditional customs are still maintained as a legacy and guide for future generations, especially in the context of marriage customs. The Orang Sungei of Pitas coexist with the Rungus and Tombonuo peoples, where their cultural identity is shaped by acculturation and assimilation, particularly with regards to animistic rituals related to death.

=== Tombonuo ===
Tombonuo people (also spelled Tambanuo) are another major Paitanic-speaking indigenous ethnicity from the Labuk-Sugut area of Beluran District, Kota Marudu District as well as Pitas District. They are known for various traditional cultural artefacts, such as the orata (physical inherited objects), which are passed down from one generation to another. They once adhered strongly to animism and the headhunting ritual known as muinsamung before mass conversion to major religions such as Christianity and Islam, with some also to Baháʼí.

=== Paitanic-speaking Dusuns ===
==== Lobu Dusuns ====
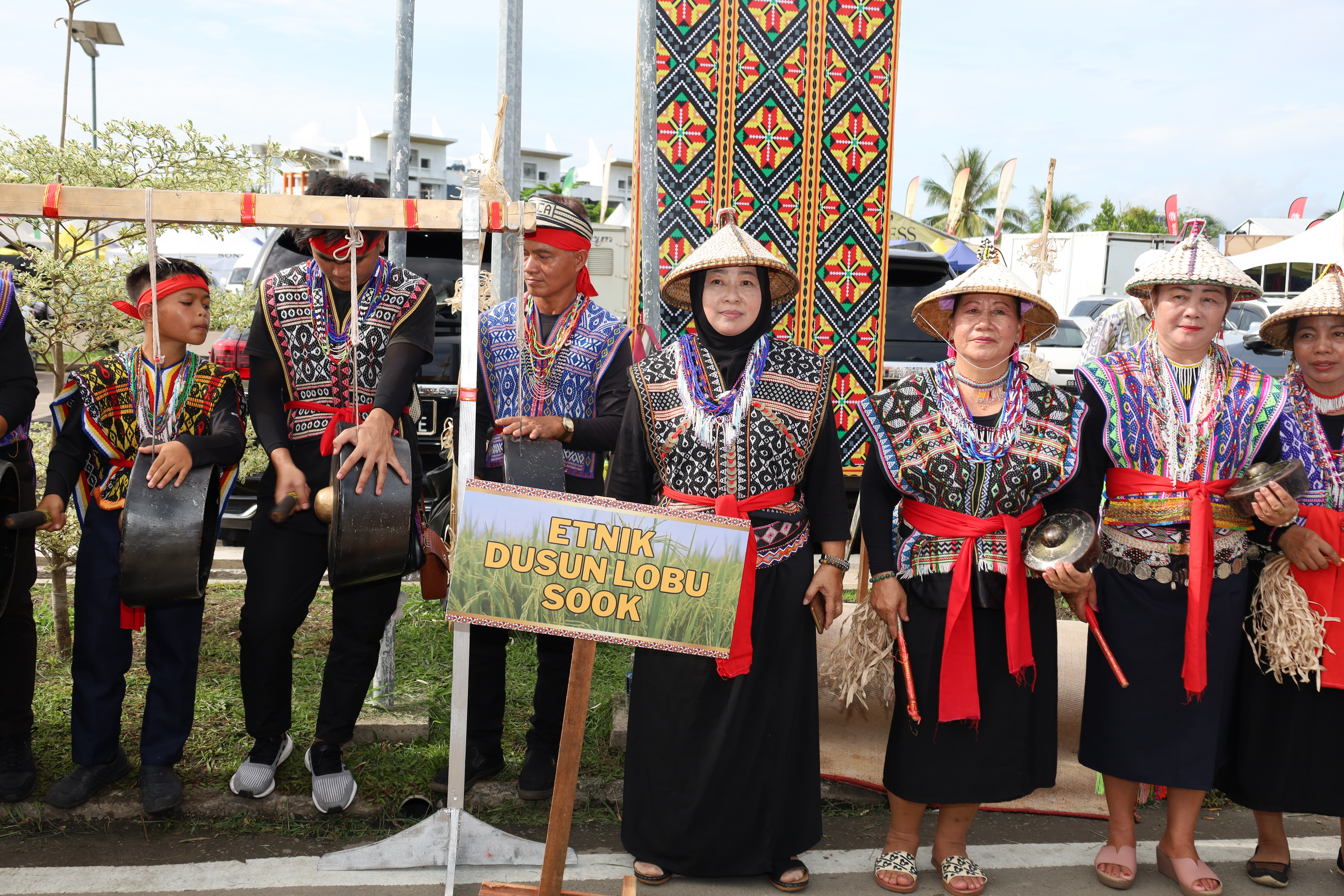
Lobu Dusun (Rumanau) of Sook, Keningau District

The Lobu people (also known as the Rumanau) self-identify as Dusun. They reside in the Lanas village of the Sook sub-district of Keningau. As of 2003, 2,800 people speak Lanas Lobu. Lobus also have a presence in Tompios Village, Ranau District. Tompios Lobu speakers number around 1,800 as of 2003. Additionally, the Lobu Dusuns of Telupid are known for their traditional boat culture and musical culture such as the mongindong and tangon instruments. As a Paitanic-speaking group, their topolects differs from neighboring Dusun groups in the Interior Division. The Lobu are known for their past as skilled hunters. Lanas and Tompios Lobus both originate from Inner Kinabatangan. They were separated due to migration as well as geographical and political boundaries. Lobu traditional woven sarongs are called binaduan, worn by women, and bayangkis is the traditional weaving craft with traditional beliefs that has its own mantra reading, motifs and taboos, such as for males it is used to provide protection or immunity to the individual before going to war, while for females it is often associated with physical appearance or beauty, especially on important events such as weddings. There is a specific traditional taboo that prohibits married individuals from weaving, but since many of the modern Lobu Dusun follow major religious beliefs such as Christianity and Islam, they are allowed to weave. Among the woven fabrics produced from Bayangkis weaving, including bakul, kapas, lilipo, raya, tikar and sirong.

==== Lahad Datu ====
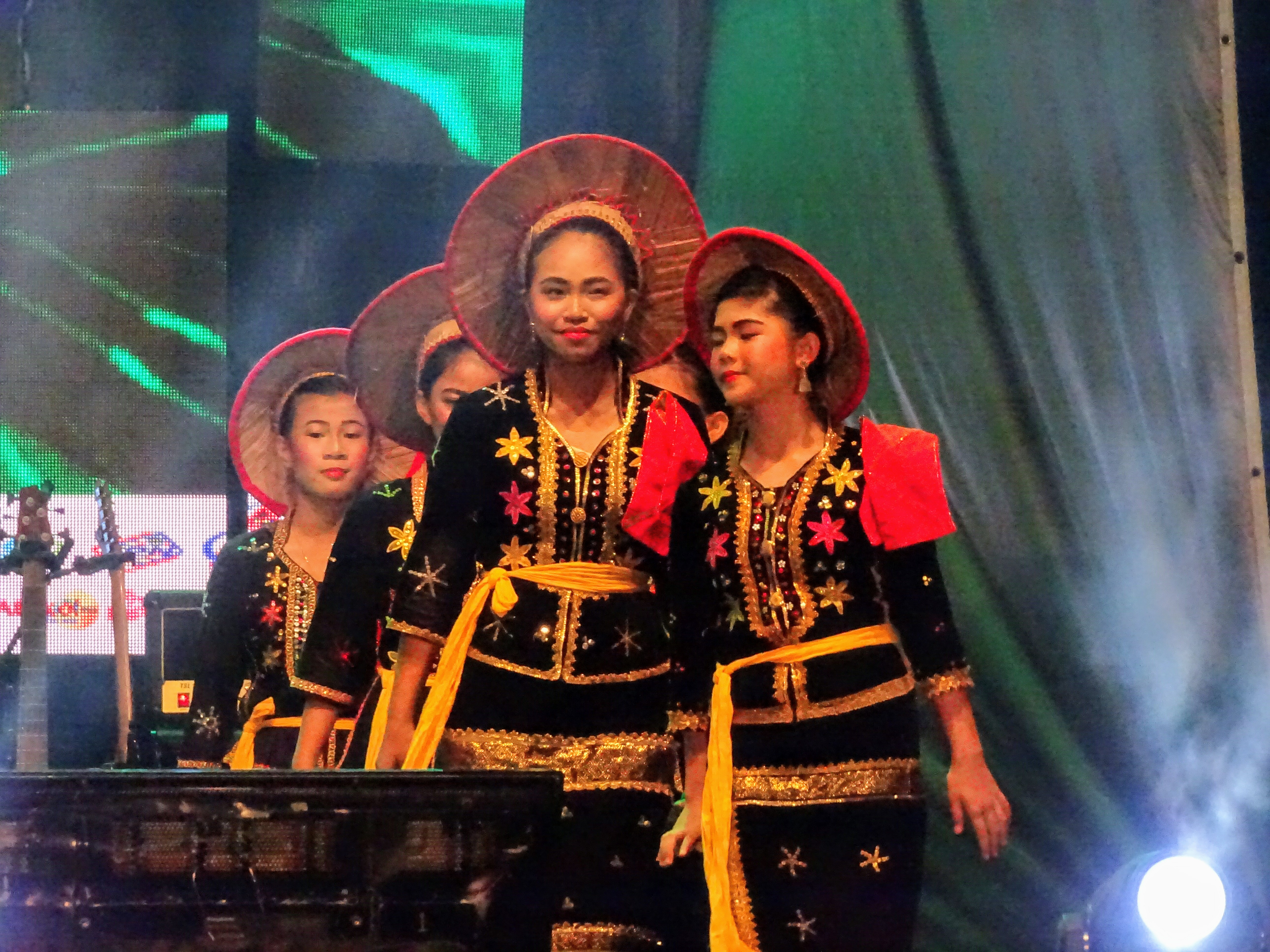
The Subpan people, one of the main ethnicities of Lahad Datu District

The Subpans (also called Saga'i, Segama Dusun, and Sopan) are a significant Paitanic-speaking people that mostly inhabit the Lahad Datu District. They formerly spoke an Idaanic language identified as Subpan but have since intermarried with people living along the Segama River, and today speak a Dusun Segama language that is intelligible with Upper Kinabatangan. This group is closely related to both the eastern Dusuns and Orang Sungei ethnic groups and are known for their cave burial traditions. The community is also well-known for its agrarian culture, with hill paddy cultivation, as well as the planting of cassava and bananas, and hunting and fishing activities within the Segama River area. The wedding traditions for this community include merisik (preliminary inquiry), proposal, berian (dowry), mangadaa-adaa, as well as the manandoh and manukab batol (traditional customs) ceremonies. This community lives along the Segama River in the villages of Balasu, Bakat Burut, Bukit Belacon, Litok Pulau, Litok Tabpoh, Masuli, Opak, Tawaiyari, Teliwas, and several more villages up to Danum Ulu Segama.

A related group is the Begak (Bagahak) of Tungku Village in Lahad Datu, whose Idaanic language is spoken by about 3,000 people. Some Begak also live within the districts of Kinabatangan and Sandakan.

== See also ==
- Dayak people, another unifying term for Bornean indigenous people used in neighbouring Sarawak and Kalimantan
- Dusun people, another classification term for Bornean indigenous people used in northwestern Sabah for Dusunic-speaking peoples
