= Paitan District =

Paitan District Daerah Paitan
- District
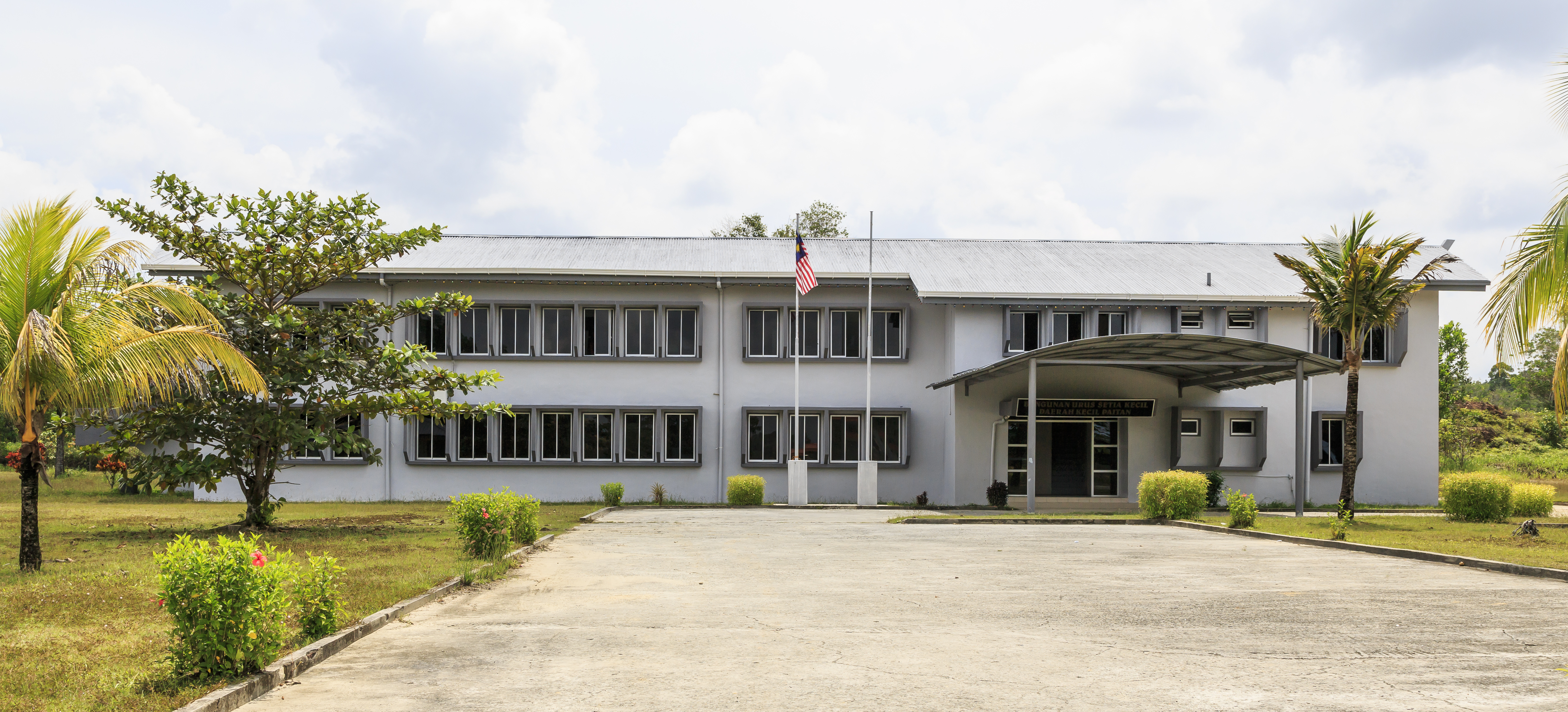
- Paitan District Secretariat Building

- Location of Paitan District in Sabah
- Coordinates: 6°20′N 117°23′E
- Country: Malaysia
- State: Sabah
- Division: Sandakan Division
- Sub-district established: 4 January 1999
- Upgraded to District: 3 July 2024
- Capital: Paitan

Area
  - Total: 2,466 km^{2} (952 sq mi)

Population (2010)
  - Total: 29,100
- Time zone: UTC+8 (Malaysian Standard Time)
- Postcode: 90100

The Paitan District (Malay: Daerah Paitan) is an administrative district in the Malaysian state of Sabah, part of the Sandakan Division. Its capital is the town of Paitan.

== History and administration ==
Paitan originally began operations as a sub-district (daerah kecil) under the administration of the Beluran District on 4 January 1999. It covers an area of 2,466 square kilometres (952 sq mi).

Recognising its growth and administrative needs, the Yang di-Pertua Negeri of Sabah officially declared the upgrade of Paitan from a sub-district to a full district. This declaration took effect on 3 July 2024 and was officially published in the Sabah State Gazette on 4 October 2024. Therefore, all related administrative matters previously handled by Beluran are now transacted directly at the Paitan administrative district.

== Geography ==
Paitan is located in the northeastern region of Sabah. The district serves as an important hub connecting several other major towns in the area. It shares border with the Pitas to the north, Kota Marudu to the northwest, Beluran to the south, Ranau to the west, and Telupid to the southwest. It also meets the Sulu Sea on its coastline.

The town of Paitan is located within inland area along the Sapi–Nangoh Highway. It was located approximately 42 kilometres (26 mi) from Kanibongan, 69 kilometres (43 mi) from Pitas, 113 kilometres (70 mi) from Kota Marudu, 198 kilometres (123 mi) from Beluran, and 230 kilometres (140 mi) from the city of Sandakan. The Paitan River is a major geographical feature flowing through the district, supporting the livelihood and agricultural activities of the local communities.

== Demographics ==
Based on estimates from the 2010s, the district has a population of approximately 29,100 people. The demographic makeup of Paitan is highly diverse and is predominantly composed of indigenous ethnic groups. The main ethnic communities residing in the district include the Dusun Tombonuo, Dusun Gobukon, Rungus, Orang Sungai (Sungai Paitan), Dusun Sandayo and Bajau Ubian.

== Gallery ==
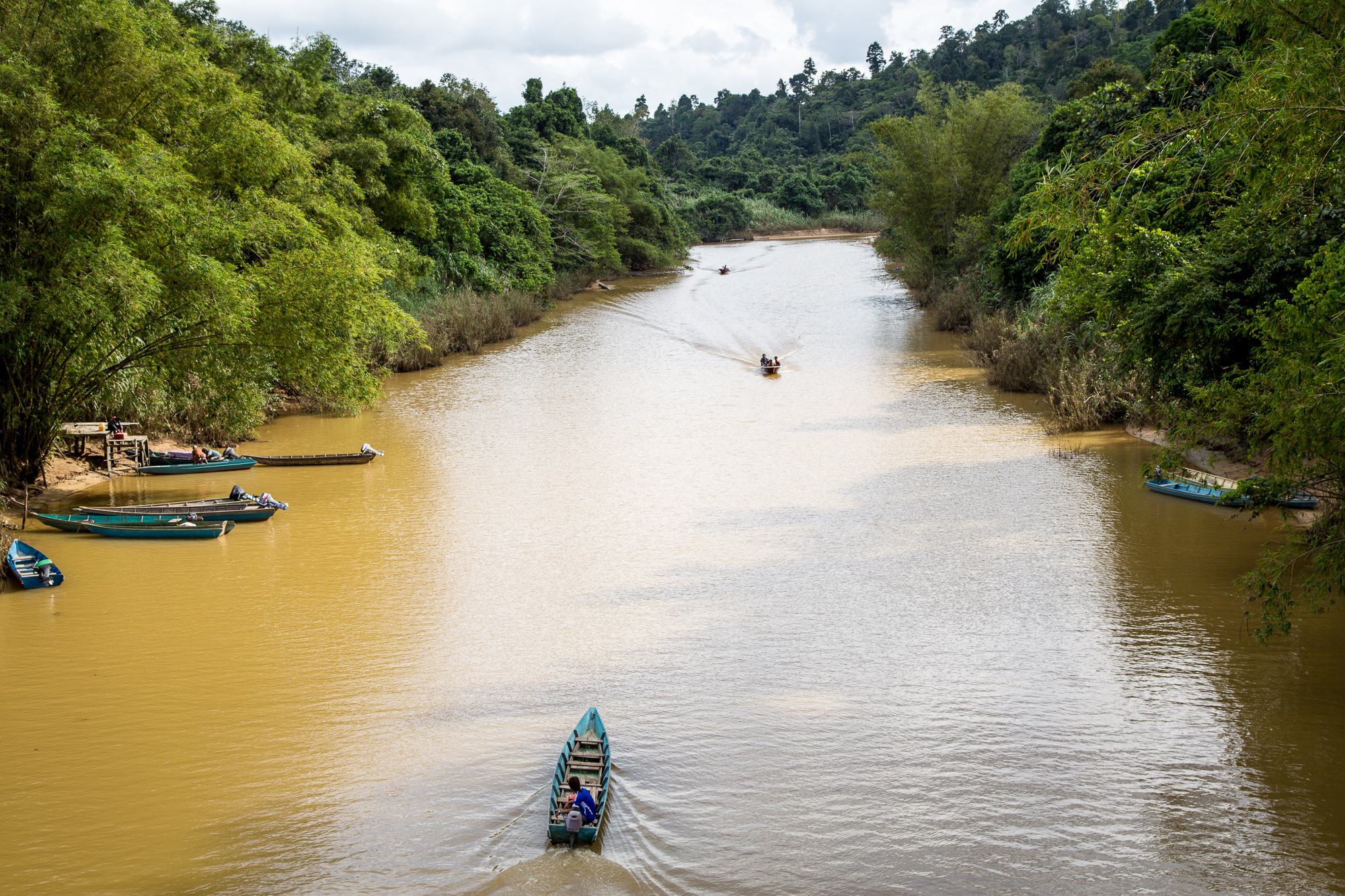
Paitan River.

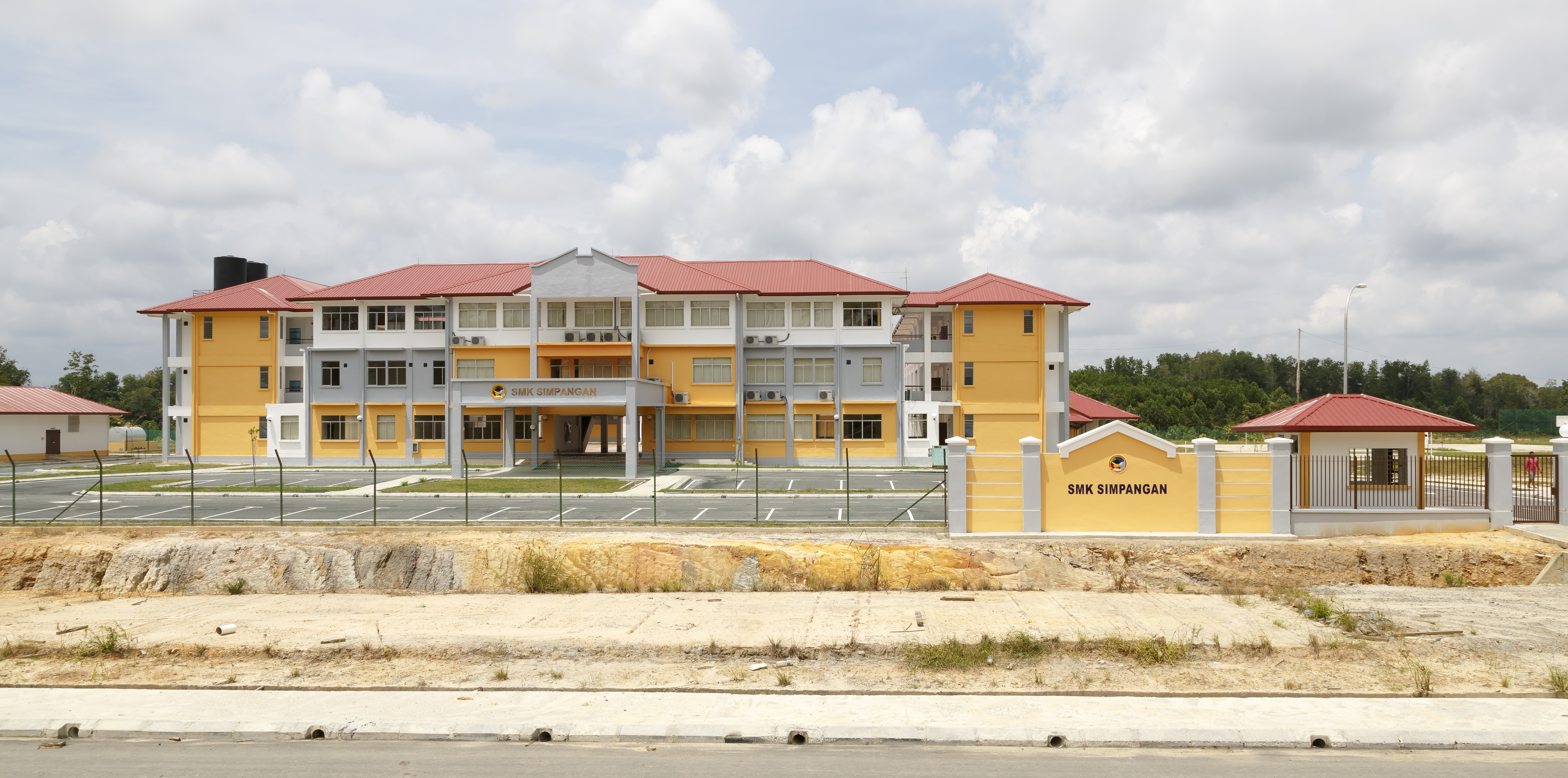
SMK Simpangan Paitan.

== See also ==
- Districts of Malaysia
