= Tombonuo people =

Indigenous ethnic group of Borneo

Tambanuo Tambanua
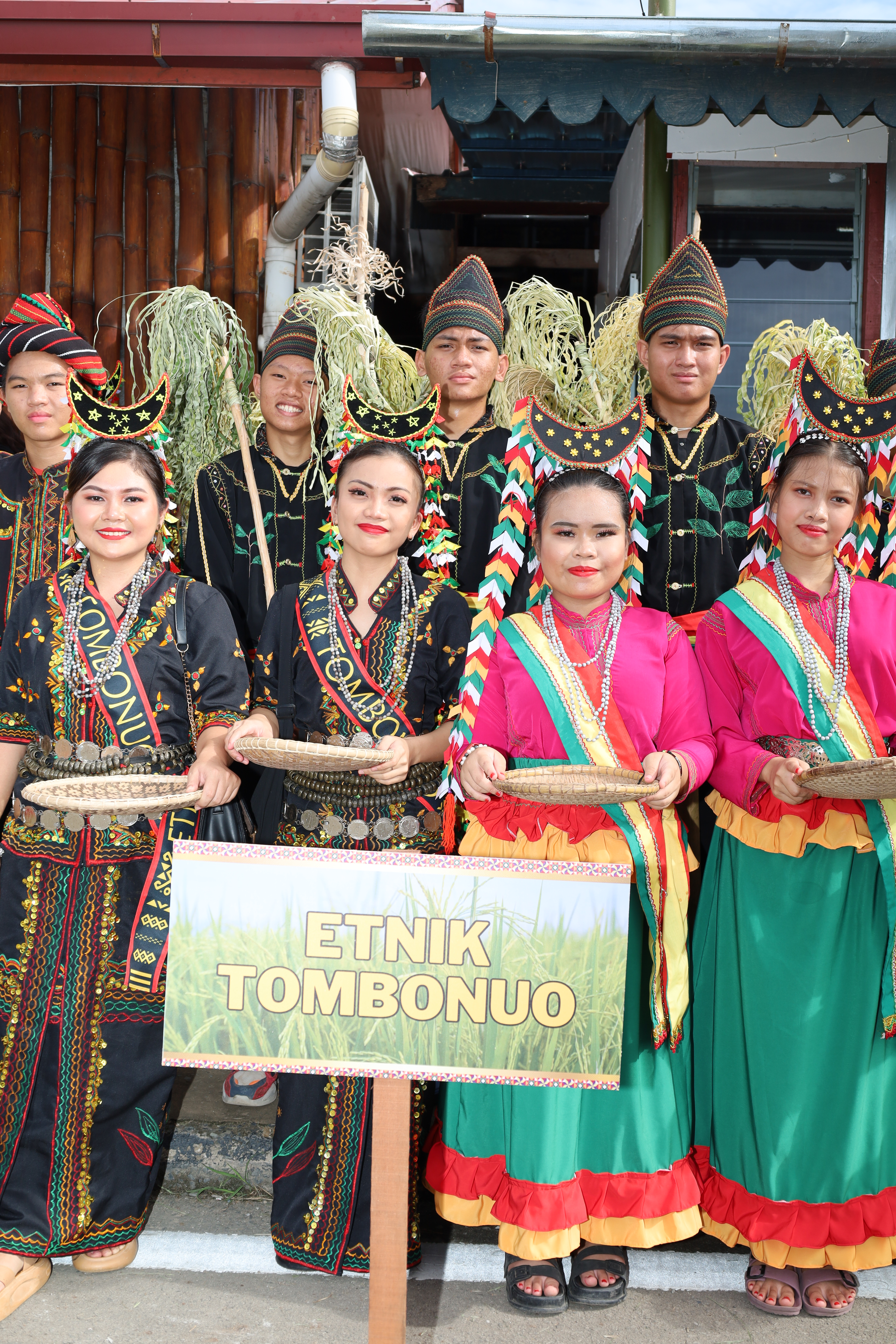
- The Tombonuo in their traditional dress

Total population
- c. 16,000 (2026)

Regions with significant populations
- Malaysia (Sabah) (Beluran, Kinabatangan, Kota Marudu, Paitan, Pitas, Ranau and Telupid districts)

Languages
- Native; Tombonuwo; Also; Sabah Malay • Standard Malay • English

Religion
- Christianity (Protestant and Roman Catholic) (majority); Animism; Islam (Sunni) (minority)

Related ethnic groups
- Paitanic related peoples; (Paitan; Orang Sungei; Rumanau); Kadazan-Dusun • Rungus • Ida'an • Bisaya • Dayak • Iban • Melanau • Lun Bawang/Dayeh • Murut • Kedayan • other Austronesian peoples

The Tombonuo people, or Tambanuo, are an Austronesian ethnic group indigenous to Sabah, Malaysia. Their populations are concentrated within Sabah's Sandakan Division, specifically in the Beluran, Kinabatangan and Paitan districts, as well as in the Kudat Division of both the Kota Marudu and Pitas districts, including the West Coast Division in the Ranau district. With an estimated population of 16,000 in the year 2026, they are closely related to the Orang Sungei where the latter had converted to the religion of Islam while many of Tombonuo follows Christianity and some remain with their animist beliefs. Their language (ISO 639-3 txa) belongs to the Paitanic branch of the Austronesian language family.

Formerly animist-pagan with strong spiritualist beliefs, most of the present-day Tombonuo adhered to Christianity, while other to either Baháʼí or Islam although the latter are more identified to as Orang Sungei. Traditionally centred around subsistence farming, hill and wet-rice cultivation, fishing, and foraging, the Tombonuo agrarian lifestyle is deeply connected to local riverine and coastal ecosystems in districts like Paitan, Pitas, and Kinabatangan. Due to its closer dialects with the Dusunic group languages, the Tombonuo is listed among the Kadazan-Dusun ethnicities under Article 6 (1) of the Kadazan Dusun Cultural Association's (KDCA) constitution.

== Etymology ==
The ethnic group are known by their various spellings, such as Tambanua, Tambannuwa, Tambanwa, Tambanwas, Tombunao and Tambunuha. Since their massive conversion to Christianity in the late 19th century, they have been known as Tombonuo. The name Tombonuo originated from the combination of two words in the Tombonuo language which are "Tombo" and "Nuo". The word Tombo in the ethnic language carries the meaning of "place", where Nuo is shortened from the word of Vonou, which carries the meaning of either "world" or "continent" and also referring to the island of Borneo.

== Background history and origin ==
The Tombonuo ethnic group is among the indigenous tribes of Sabah, classified within the Paitanic group, which also includes the Lobu, Lingkabau, Sugpan, and Upper Kinabatangan. The majority of historical analyses concerning the ethnicity frequently depend on folklore, legends, and myths transmitted via oral tradition. Historical accounts indicate that the Tombonuo once resided in Kanibongan Village (Kampung Kanibongan). During the conventional ethnic conflict era, the Tombonuo, together with other ethnic groups from the Momogun, Sukang, and Makiang, opted to relocate from coastal regions to interior locales like Paitan and Sugut. Individuals who have embraced Islam are referred to as the Orang Sungei, yet they continue to maintain their Tombonuo language and cultural heritage. The Tombonuo is listed among the 48 Kadazan-Dusun ethnicities.

== Culture and society ==
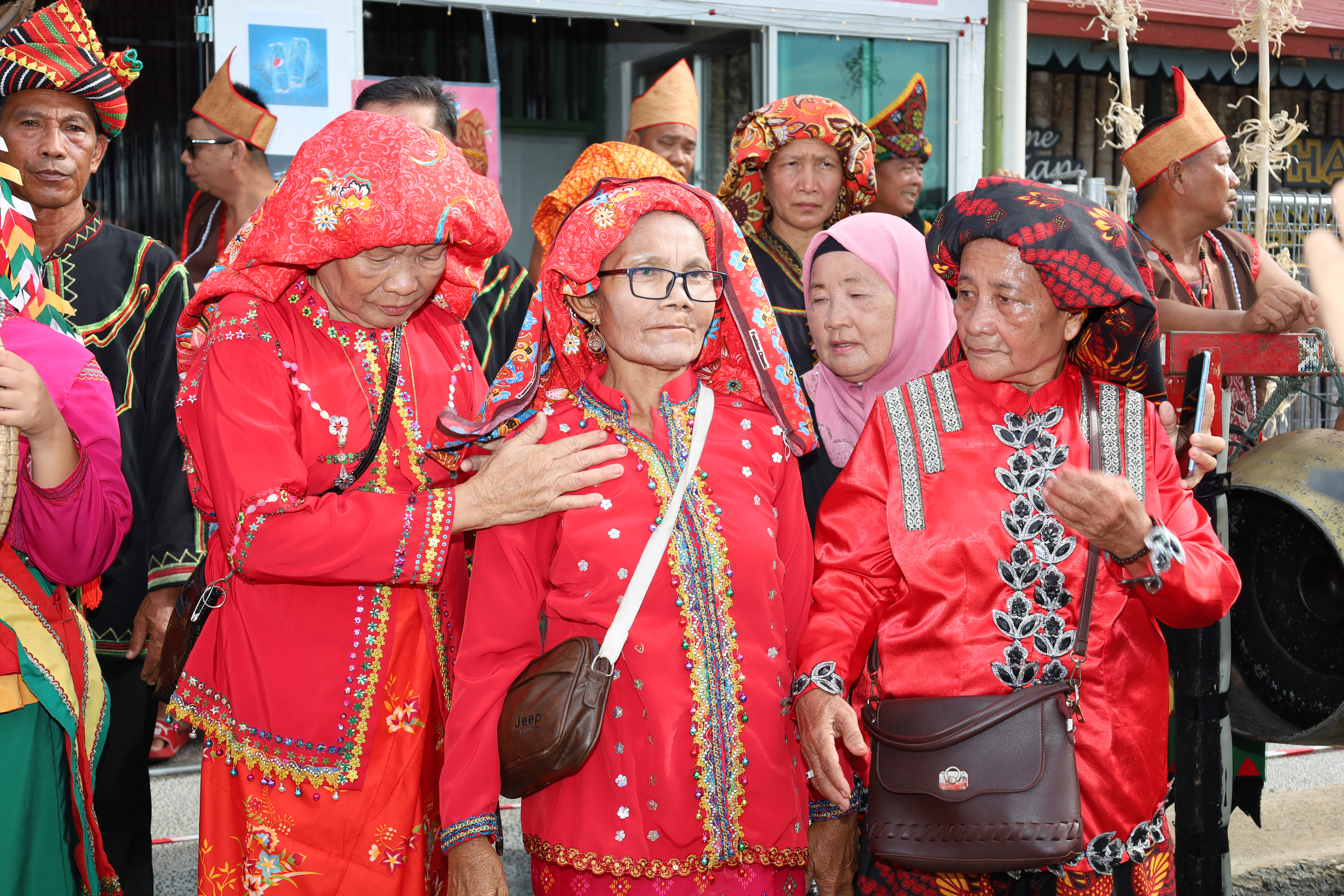
Tombonuo elderly in traditional dress

The Tombonuo traditionally grow hill rice, root crops, and local vegetables; catch fish; and gather forest and mangrove resources for their local medicine and food, although in modern days their ancestral lands were subjected to frequent encroachment by unscrupulous companies. Tombonuo ethnic cultural heritage is overseen and preserved by the Sabah Tombonuo Association (Standard Malay: Persatuan Bangsa Tombonuo Sabah), which is also responsible for the management of Tombonuo Cultural House in Paitan. The Tombonuo annually observed the Rami-Rami Poriamo festival, which refers to a large gathering or celebration that unites the entire Tombonuo community in the spirit of family, unity, customs and culture.

=== Music and dance ===
The ethnic are known for their traditional Sumanggak dance, which originated from the muinamung ceremony performed during the mengayau (headhunting) group on their way back to their village. The concept of dance performances underwent a transformation during the British administration period in the late 19th century with the previous ceremony was replaced with the monginsamung ceremony, which welcomed the return of their ethnic warriors. The change subsequently altered the dance movement patterns, costumes, and musical instruments, including the props, in terms of function and processing with each movement pattern is closely associated with the traditional rituals of the Tombonuo ethnic group.

=== Attire ===
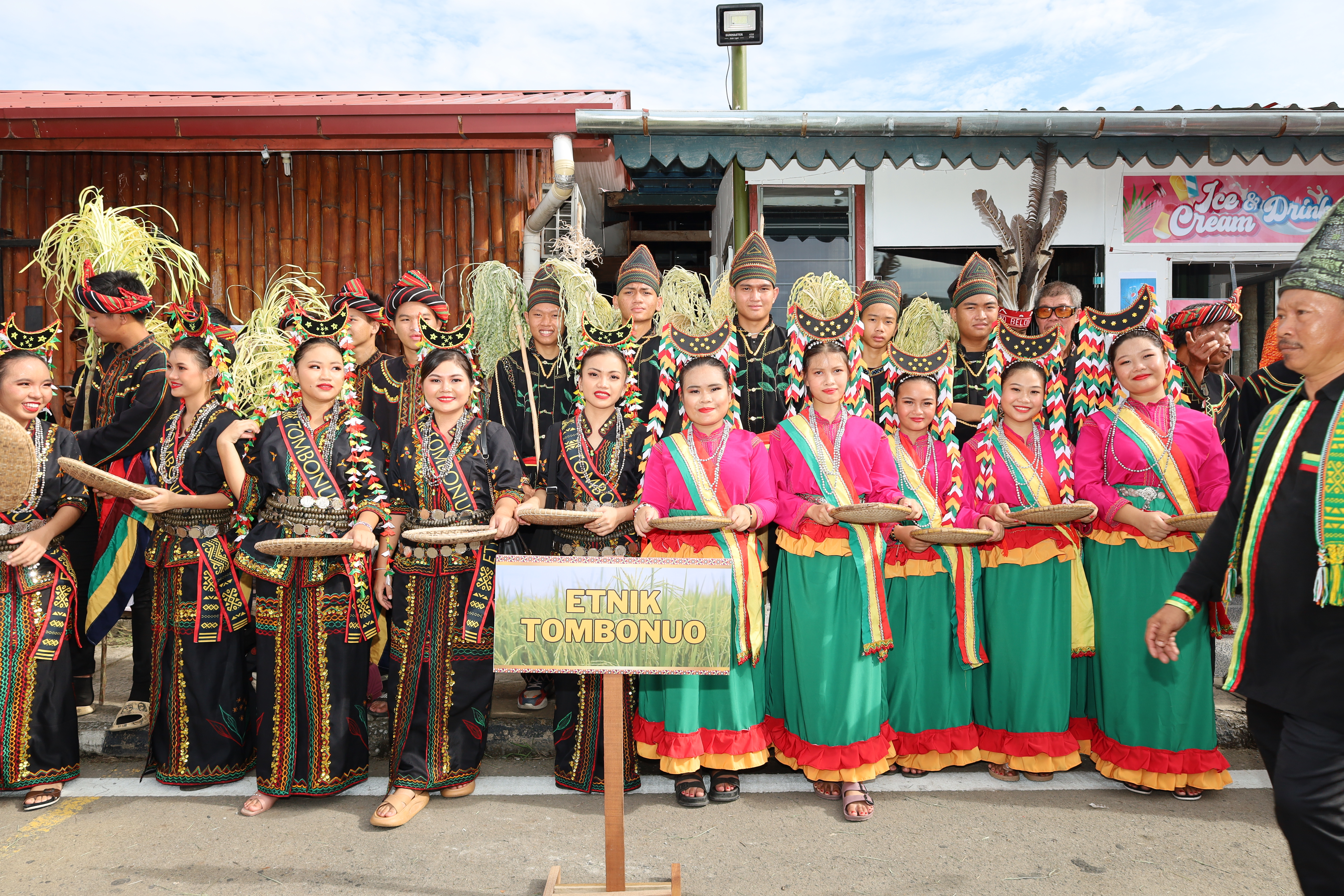
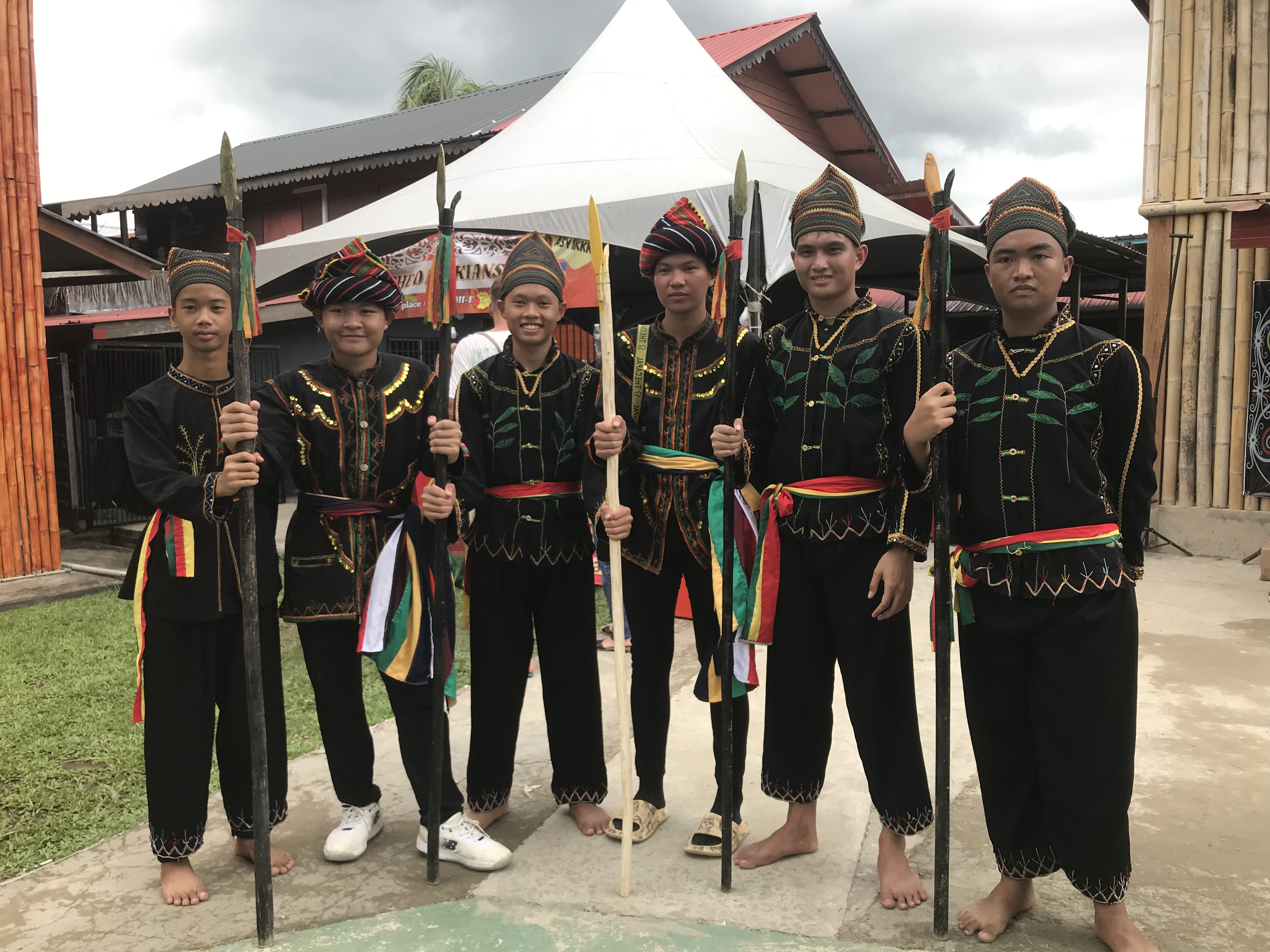
(L–R) Tombonuo female ethnic attire • Tombonuo male ethnic attire

Traditional Tombonuo attire for both males and females is the Sabung Impit, where Sabung means either "blouse or shirt", while Impit means "fit". The female dress accessories consist of aboi, atalambu, banglu, golong lungkaki, golong onsungoi, janji, liningkong, lungkaki, pantis, ramboi, tapi, tinombuku, and tinggol onsungoi/aki, while the male accessories consist of kambot, kontiu, golong lungkaki, pangkos, sopilang, soput, tolungas tapi/singal, and tongap. The banglu is the most common female headdress among the Tombonuos, with a moon-shaped crescent made of coconut shell which is often paired with another moon-shaped cloth in three colours of green, white, and yellow called ramboi together with tinombuku (female hair bun). The design of the female's Sabung Impit is based on the Tombonuo proverb, "Osiow pugikolan nu tinaih no" (a female who is slim and possesses a good body shape). Among the Paitan Tombonuo males, the main symbol is the personal adornment of a handkerchief on the head, which is made with the saying "Tombonuo okon po ko toranan nopomintangan ku yoh" (to appreciate the future spouse). In the past, the Tombonuos of Paitan held the belief that a Tombonuo male adorned with pangkos on his arms is a powerful and esteemed person, while those who own a soput are strong and brave, defined as hunters and capable of protecting females since they have skills in monyoput/menyumpit (blowgun). The male waist has a tongap for ramok, a traditional bamboo gun among the Tombonuo which is produced from roots combined to form toxic substances.

=== Cuisine ===
The Tombonuo traditional dish is the tambah (pickle condiment/relish), landam (dessert), and sinolui (corn snacks/kuih). The tambah usually consists of fish with cassava and fruit such as papaya.

=== Religion ===
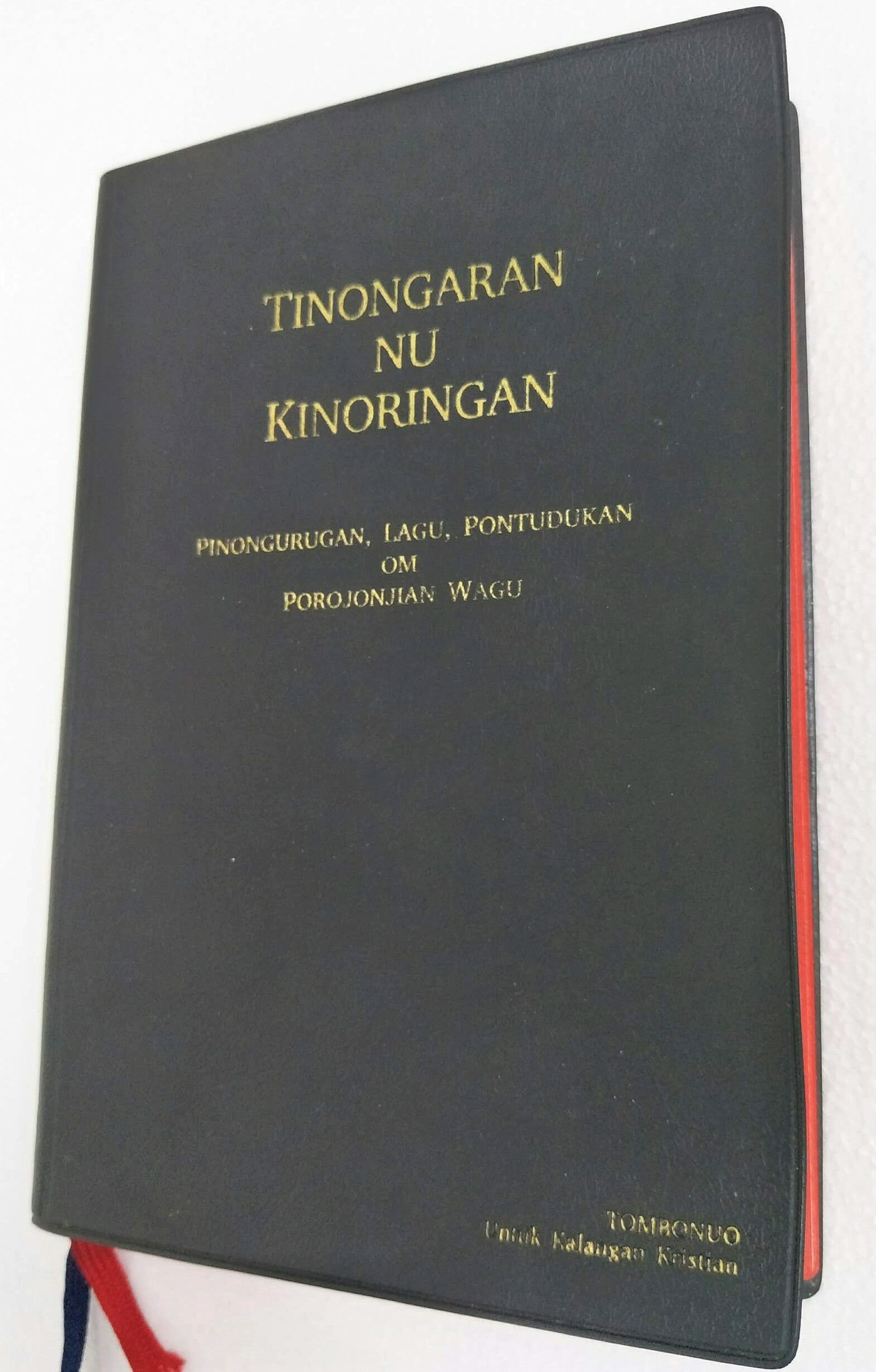
The New Testament in Tombonuwo language

The majority of Tambonuo in Sabah are Christian, followed by Baháʼí and some Muslims. Traditionally, their belief was animist-pagan, believing in various types of spirits and supernatural beings, especially guardians; jadi-jadian (shapeshifting); sogit (ritual fines); the village heat custom and komburongo (a kind of good spirit); and gonding (ritual tools made of metal pieces). Many Tombonuos are adherents of the Protestant Church in Sabah. In addition to Islam and Christianity, the Tombonuo ethnic group has also embraced a new religion, namely the Baháʼí religion, since the early 1990s, where the religion jointly co-exists with their customs, which are not being influenced by the latter religion.

=== Language ===
The Tombonuwo language (northern Paitanic) is closely related to Mangka'ak, one of the Dusun dialects, with which it shares 59.11% intelligibility. There also exist some differences with the Kalabuan (southern Paitanic of the upper Kinabatangan River). Below are some examples of Tombonuo and Mangka'ak words with translations in English:

English	Tombonuo	Mangka'ak
Me	Aku	Oku
Them	Nosiro	Yolo
Where?	Sombo'?	Sombo?
When?	Ombia?	Songia?
Male	Kusoi	Kusai
Female	Wianoi	Tongondu
Drink	Inum	Ngiup
Rain	Uran	Darun
Water	Sungoi	Vaig
Moon	Ulan	Tulun
Sun	Mato runat	Tadau
Night	Awi	Otuvong
