= TXA =

TXA or txa may refer to:

- Tranexamic acid, a medication used to treat or prevent excessive blood loss from major trauma and postpartum bleeding
- TXA, the Amtrak station code for Texarkana Union Station, Arkansas, United States
- txa, the ISO 639-3 code for Tombonuwo language, Sabah, Malaysia
- TXA_{2}, short for Thromboxane A_{2}
- TX-A, code on number plates for taxis in Belgium
