= Kota Marudu District =

Kota Marudu District Daerah Kota Marudu
- District
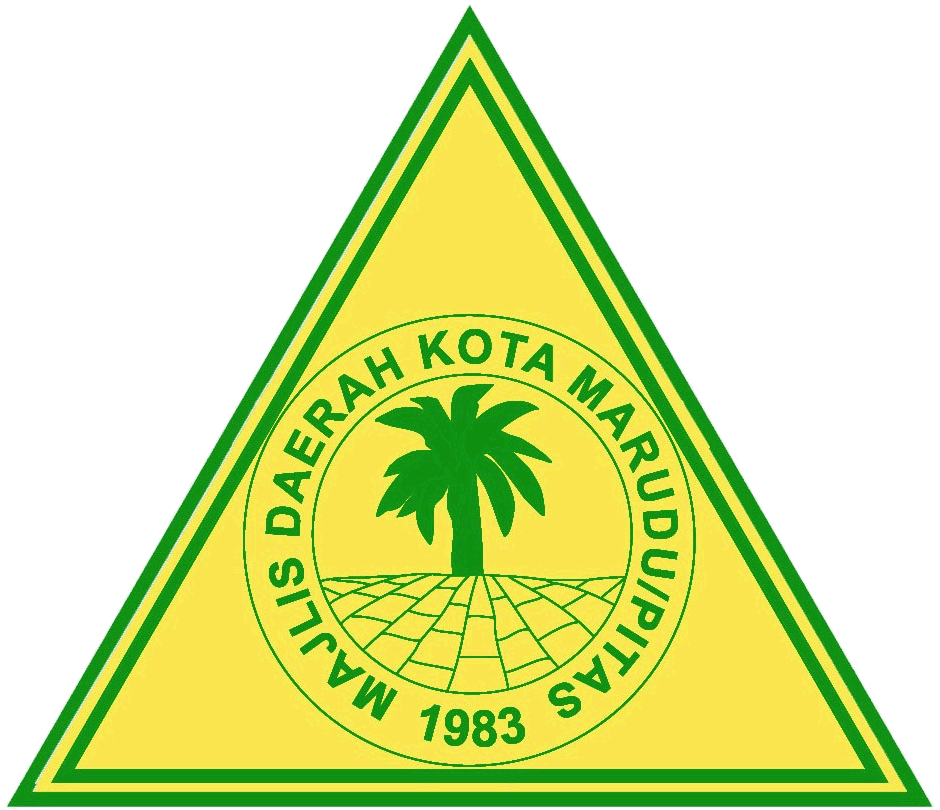
- Seal

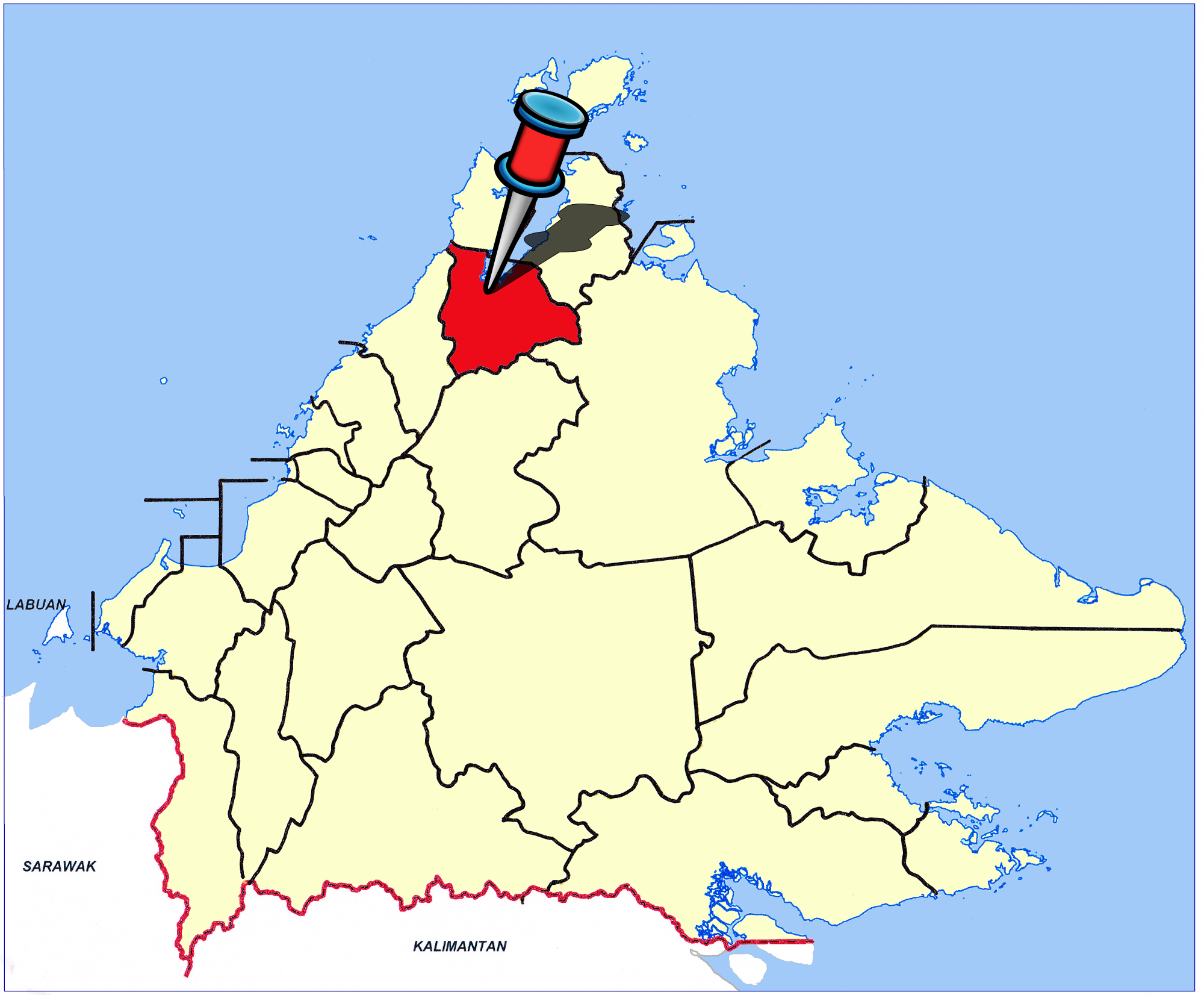
- Coordinates: 6°29′23″N 116°44′10″E
- Country: Malaysia
- State: Sabah
- Division: Kudat
- Capital: Kota Marudu

Government
  - District Officer: Meirin Sugara

Area
  - Total: 1,917 km^{2} (740 sq mi)
- Elevation: 11 m (36 ft)
- Highest elevation: 2,579 m (8,461 ft)

Population (2010)
  - Total: 66,374
- Website: mdkotamarudu.sbh.gov.my pdkotamarudu.sbh.gov.my

Map of Kota Marudu District

The Kota Marudu District (Malay: Daerah Kota Marudu) is an administrative district in the Malaysian state of Sabah, part of the Kudat Division which includes the districts of Kota Marudu, Kudat and Pitas. The capital of the district is in Kota Marudu Town.

== Etymology ==
Kota means Fort. The name Marudu originated from the language of Balangigi people from the words of "Mairudu" or "Maiuludu" which means "a position located in the same place", referring to the geographical position of Marudu Bay which forms a large bay. Since then, the term Mairudu turns to Marudu and Mailudu becomes Maludu. Hence, Western writers often refer to Marudu as Marudu, Marudo or Maludu. The name Marudu was first mapped by a Dutch sailor in 1595 who sailed from Brunei and reached Marudu, Palawan and the Sulu Archipelago. While in the waters of Marudu, he found the Balangigi people or also called by the Spaniards as the "Camucones" (Note: Description about the Camucones (See ref).) became the sea troops of the Sultanates of Brunei and Sulu at the time.

== History ==
The district is once known as the stronghold of a local leader named Sharif Usman. The Sharif administer the area under the consent of the Sultanate of Sulu although he administer the place under his own as an independent chiefdom. He later involved in a dispute with the colonial authorities of British North Borneo after being accused as a pirate and involved in a slave trade, where he was killed during a battle with the latter and his entire fort in the area was destroyed. The district were once designated as a sub-district of Kudat District in 1952, known as Bandau, before upgraded to a full elevated district and renamed as "Kota Marudu".

== Demographics ==
The population of Kota Marudu district according to the last census in 2010 is 66,374. It consists mainly of Dusun (from the Gobukon, Tobilung, Tagahas, Bunduliwan-Tinagas, Kimaragang-Sonsogon, Garo, Luba and Talantang tribes), Rungus, Bajau, Orang Sungai (Tambanuo) and Chinese (mainly Hakkas). As in other districts of Sabah, there are a significant number of illegal immigrants from the nearby southern Philippines, notably from the Sulu Archipelago and Mindanao which are not included in the population statistics.

== Infrastructure ==
Kota Marudu features a dual carriageway within its township area, Kota Marudu town. It was planned in 2021 before it was eventually built in 2025, transition from a single to dual carriageway to ease traffic congestion.

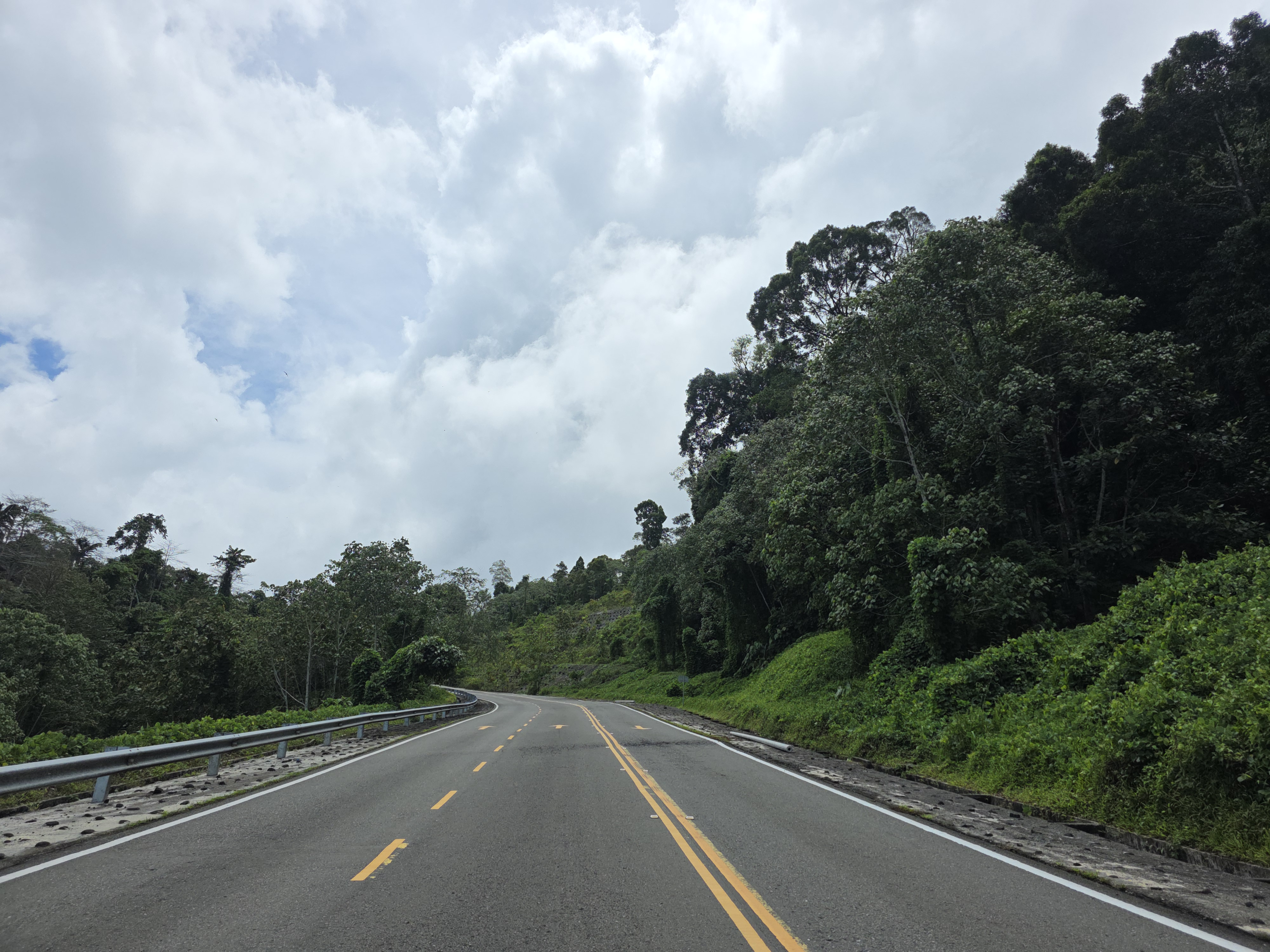
Marak Parak Highway, a high-altitude mountainous road as it crosses the Crocker Range just the eastern parallel to Kinabalu National Park. It features twisties along steeper road gradient from 10% to 16%. It was also considered as one of the high-altitude road in Sabah, which reaching the summit of 770 m (2,530 ft).

Major highway in the district includes Federal Route 1 of Sabah which was part of the broader Pan Borneo Highway, the Sapi–Nangoh Highway which connects to Pitas, Paitan and Sandakan, and the Marak Parak Highway which connects the town of Kota Marudu to Ranau along village from the Interior Division, which also serves as an alternative to the Sapi–Nangoh Highway from Kudat to Sandakan for better road conditions, and short distance. A proposed industrial parks along the stretch between Kota Belud and Kota Marudu will also be built. Facility upgrades by tourism, as a project, comprised a mix of rolling plan initiatives and works under the preservation, conservation, alteration and upgrading programme, covering jetties, visitor facilities, heritage assets and tourism infrastructure across multiple district, which is part of 13th Malaysian Plan.

== Gallery ==
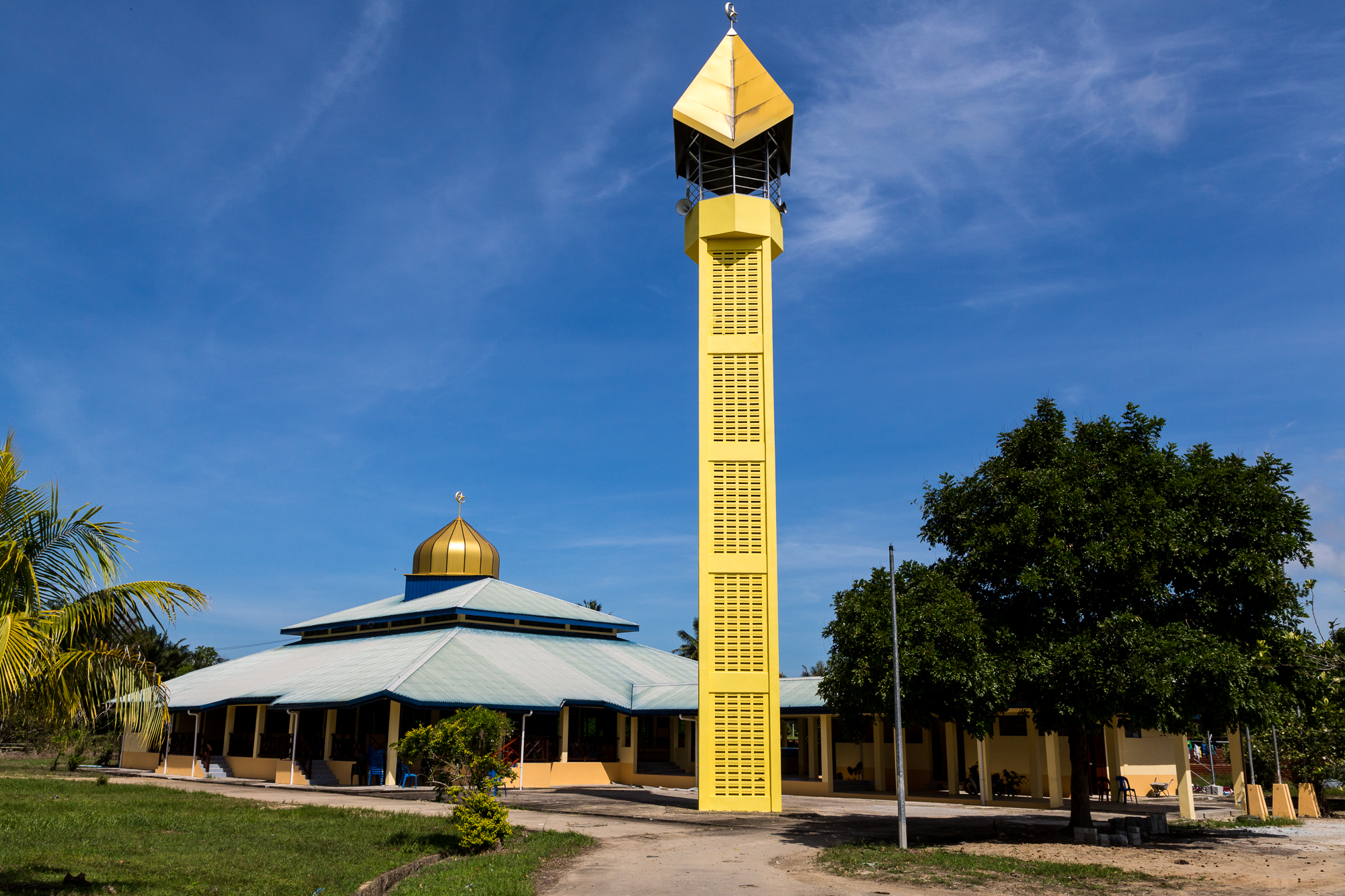
Tandek Mosque.

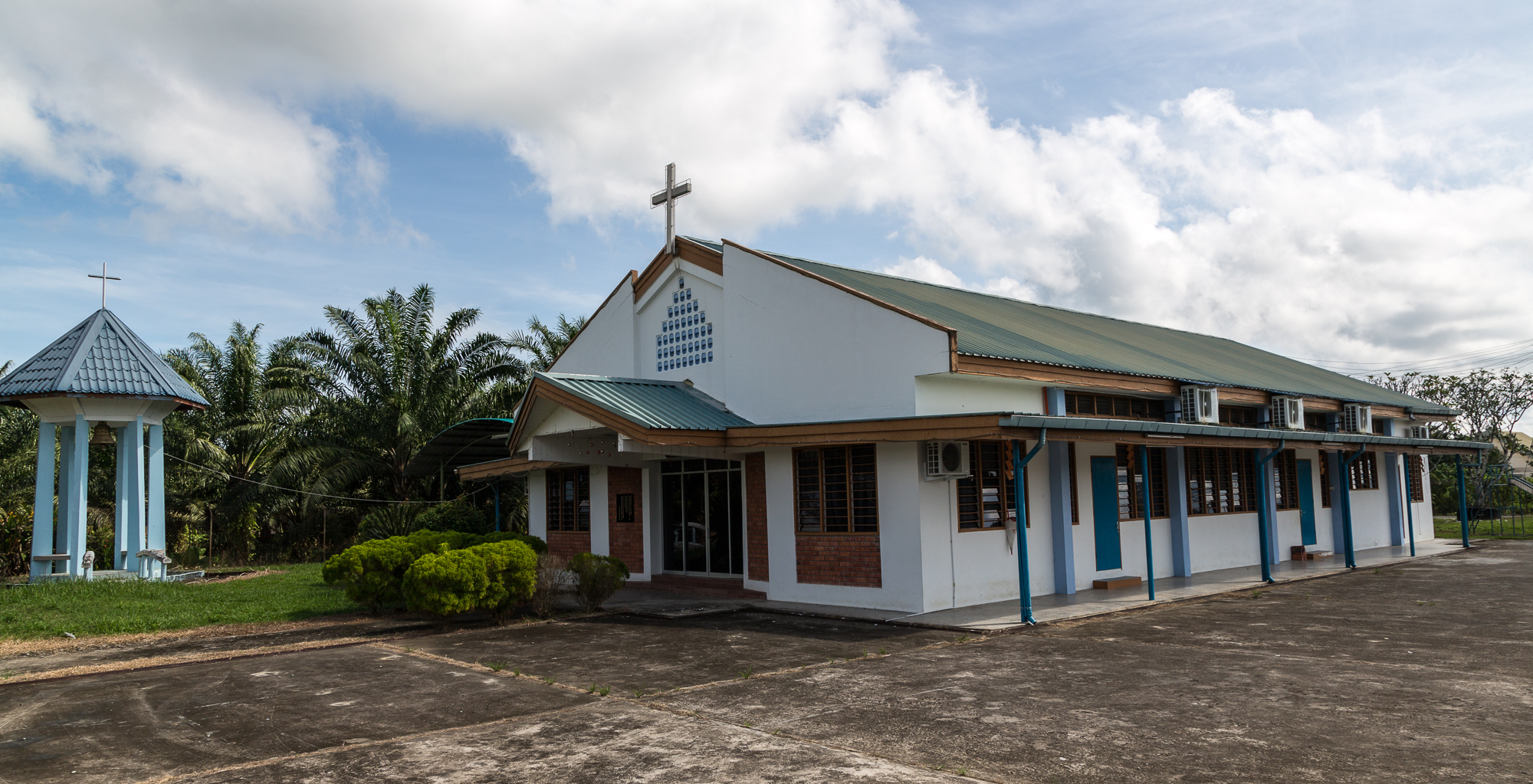
Kota Marudu Basel Church.

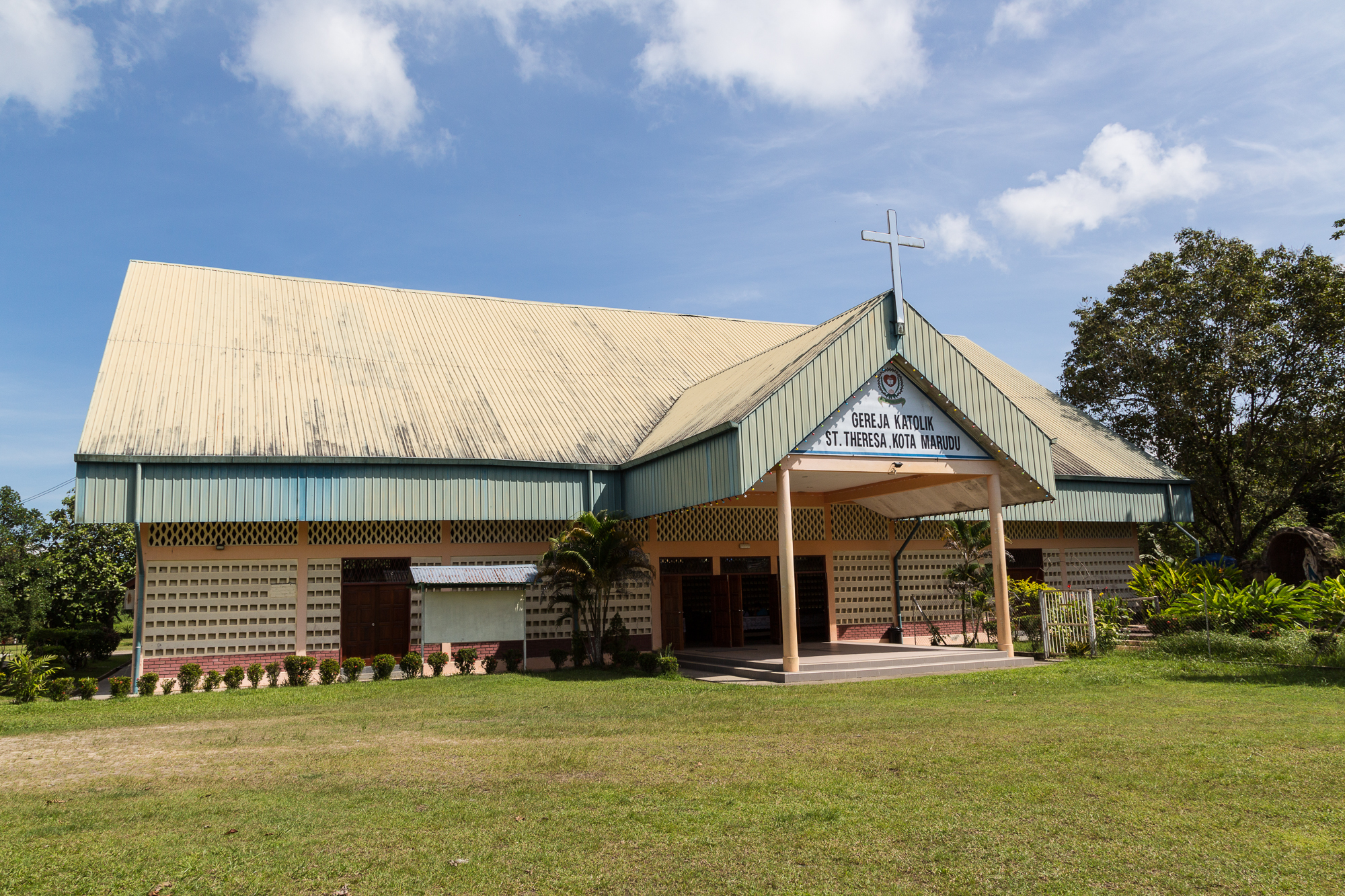
St. Theresa Catholic Church.

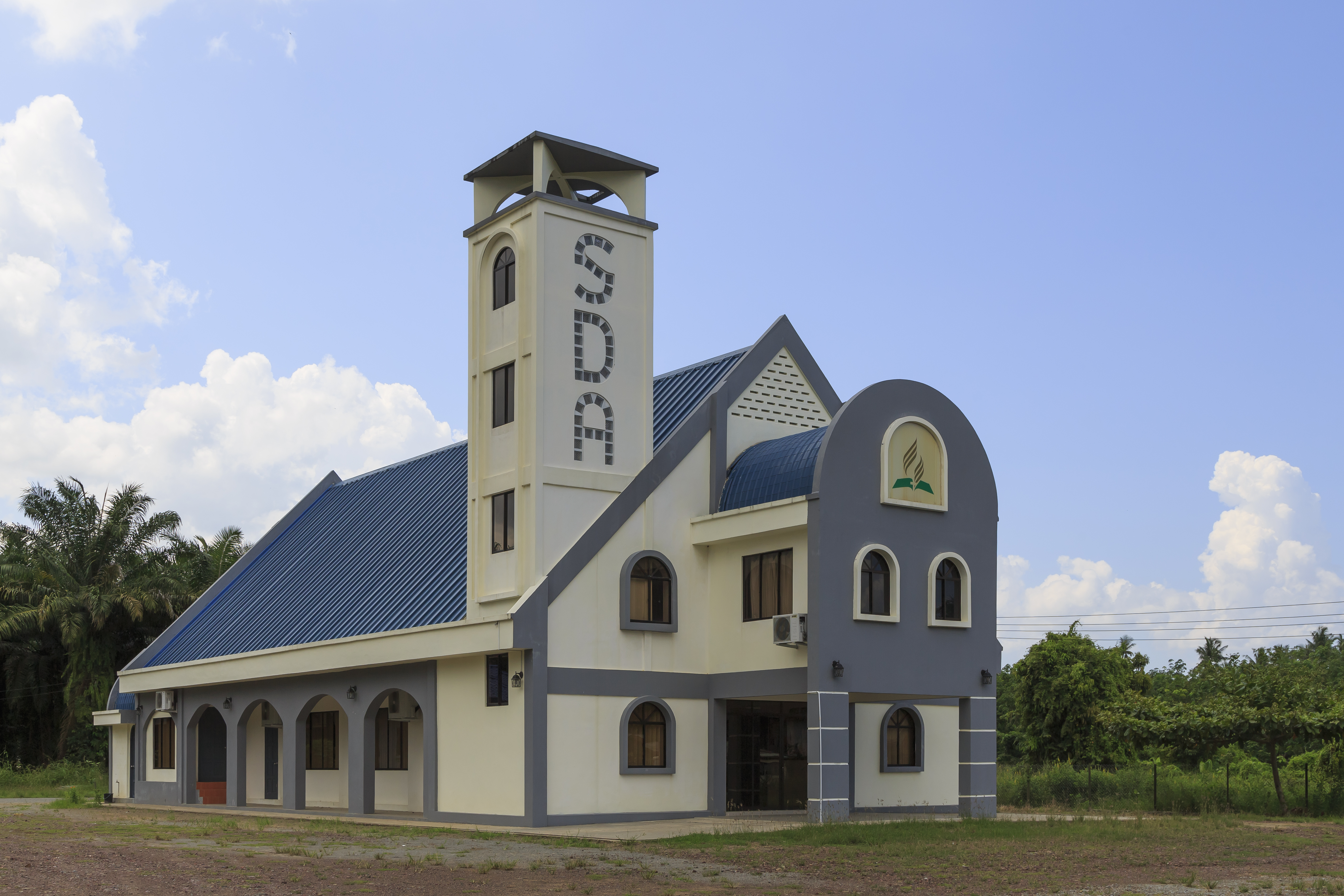
Goshen Seventh Day Adventist Church.

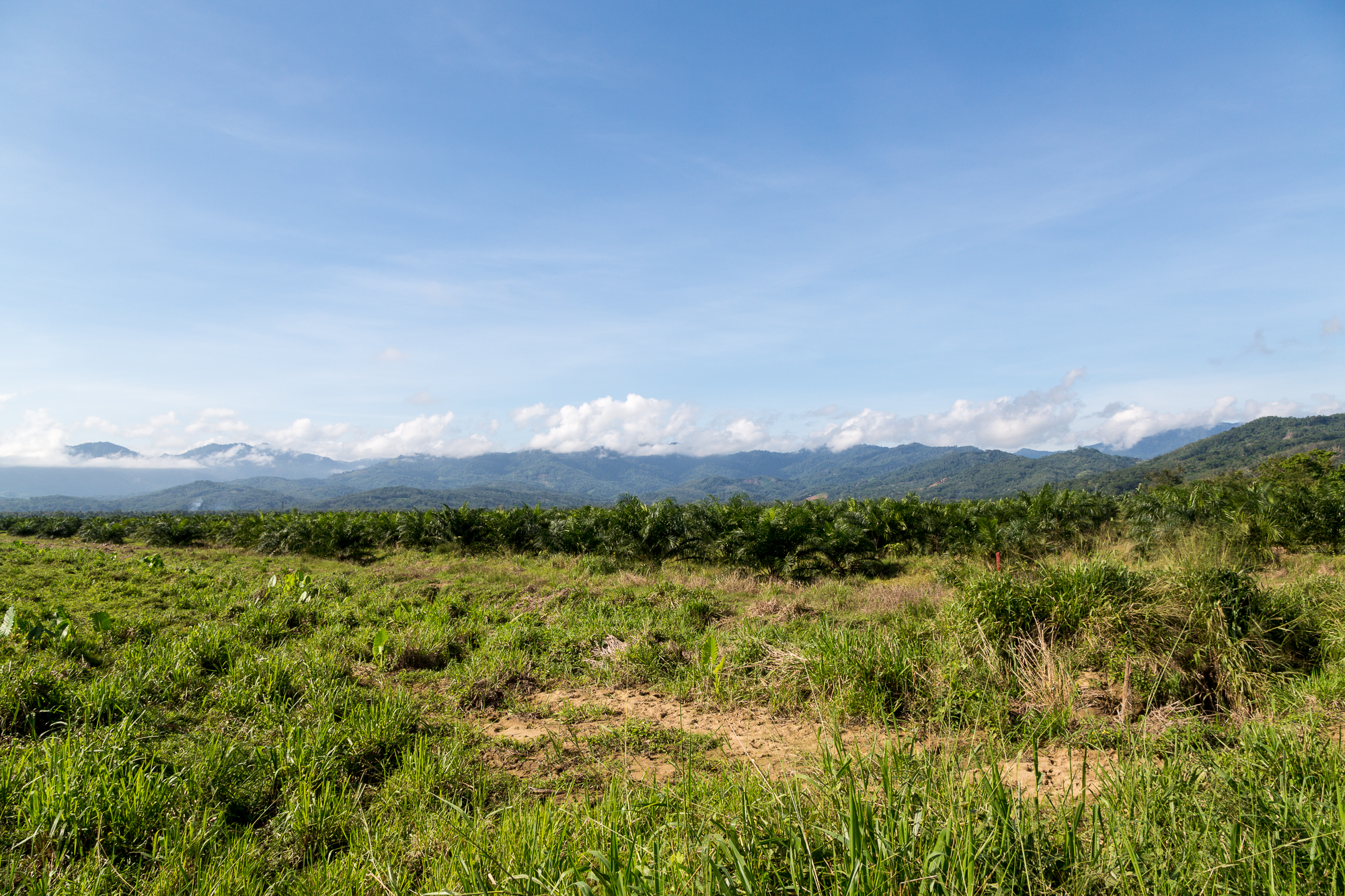
Crocker Range.

== See also ==
- Districts of Malaysia
