= Pitas, Malaysia =

Pitas Pekan Pitas
- Town and district capital
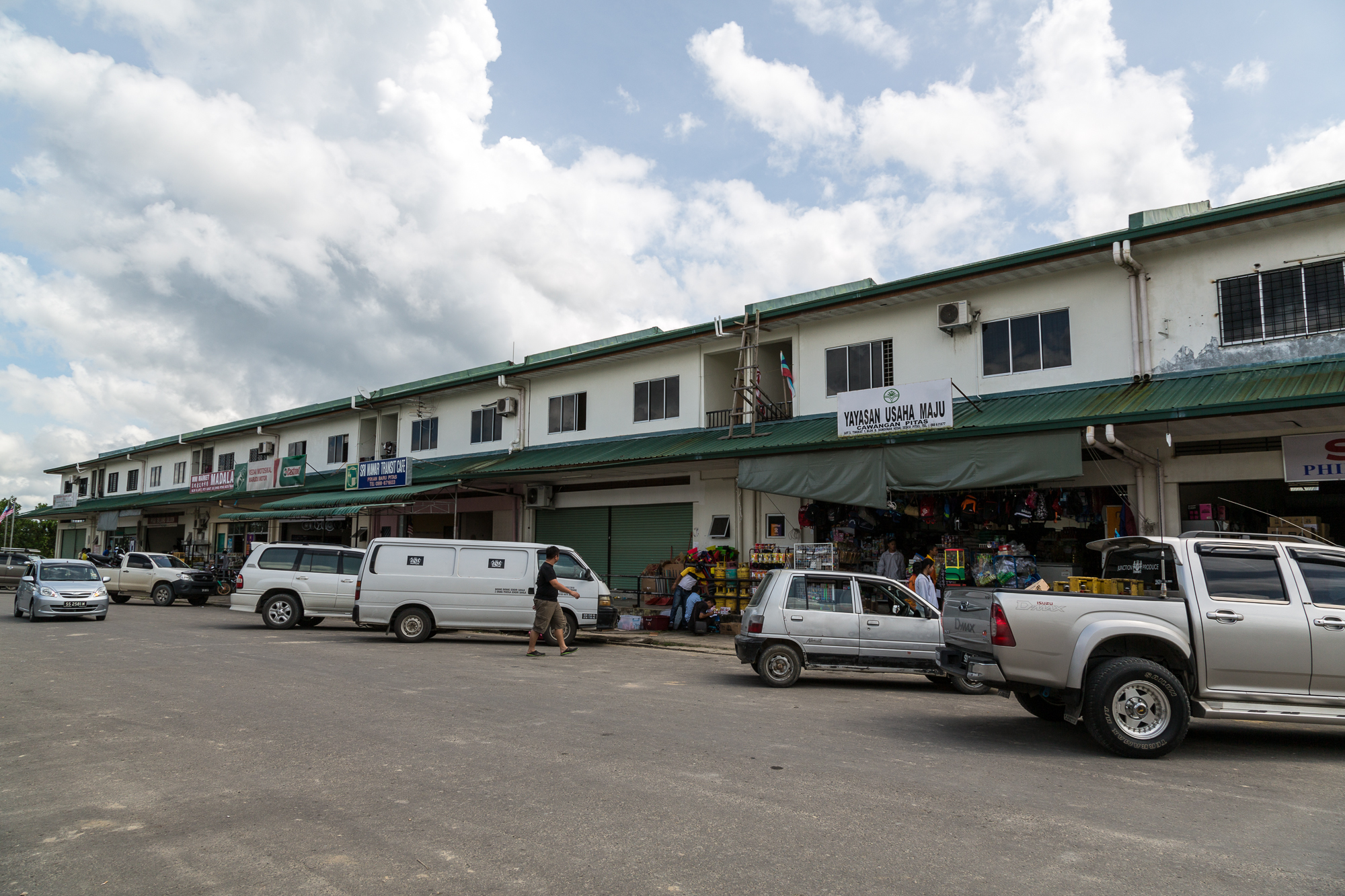
- Shoplots in Pitas.

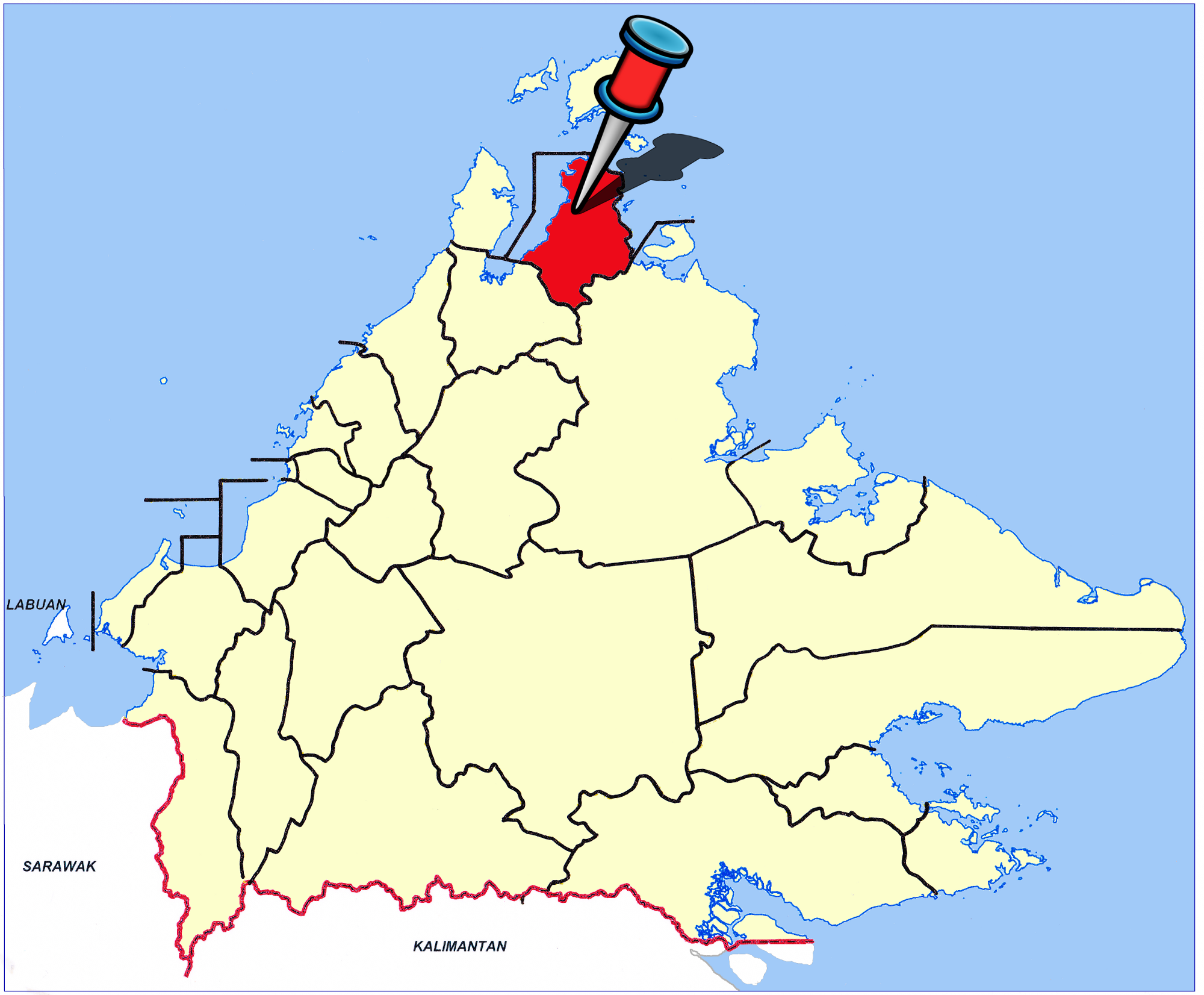
- Coordinates: 6°43′00″N 117°04′00″E
- Country: Malaysia
- State: Sabah
- Division: Kudat
- District: Pitas

Area
  - Total: 1,419.35 km^{2} (548.01 sq mi)

Population (2010)
  - Total: 895
- Postcode: 89100
- Website: mdpitas.sabah.gov.my

Pitas (Malay: Pekan Pitas) is the capital of the Pitas District in the Kudat Division of Sabah, Malaysia. Its population was estimated to be around 895 in 2010. The local populace is made up predominantly of ethnic Rungus (majority), Orang Sungai, Tombonuo and Kimaragang descent, with a small number of Malaysian Chinese and other ethnic minorities. Due to its geographical isolation and the general unsuitability of the land for agriculture, Pitas has one of the highest rates of poverty in Sabah.

== Climate ==
Pitas has a tropical rainforest climate (Af) with heavy to very heavy rainfall year-round.

Climate data for Pitas
Month	Jan	Feb	Mar	Apr	May	Jun	Jul	Aug	Sep	Oct	Nov	Dec	Year
Mean daily maximum °C (°F)	29.6 (85.3)	29.9 (85.8)	30.6 (87.1)	31.6 (88.9)	32.0 (89.6)	31.6 (88.9)	31.4 (88.5)	31.4 (88.5)	30.9 (87.6)	30.8 (87.4)	30.4 (86.7)	29.9 (85.8)	30.8 (87.5)
Daily mean °C (°F)	26.2 (79.2)	26.3 (79.3)	26.8 (80.2)	27.6 (81.7)	27.9 (82.2)	27.5 (81.5)	27.2 (81.0)	27.2 (81.0)	26.8 (80.2)	27.0 (80.6)	26.8 (80.2)	26.4 (79.5)	27.0 (80.6)
Mean daily minimum °C (°F)	22.8 (73.0)	22.8 (73.0)	23.1 (73.6)	23.6 (74.5)	23.8 (74.8)	23.5 (74.3)	23.1 (73.6)	23.1 (73.6)	22.8 (73.0)	23.2 (73.8)	23.2 (73.8)	23.0 (73.4)	23.2 (73.7)
Average rainfall mm (inches)	456 (18.0)	261 (10.3)	188 (7.4)	93 (3.7)	156 (6.1)	149 (5.9)	135 (5.3)	121 (4.8)	136 (5.4)	190 (7.5)	269 (10.6)	467 (18.4)	2,621 (103.4)
Source: Climate-Data.org
