= Tombonuwo language =

Austronesian language spoken in Sabah, Malaysia

Tombonuo
- Lobu · Mutangar Tombonuo
- Native to: Malaysia
- Region: Sabah
- Ethnicity: Tombonuo
- Native speakers: (10,000 cited 2000); 3,000 Lingkabau (2003)
- Language family: Austronesian: Malayo-Polynesian; North Bornean; Southwest Sabahan; Paitanic; Tombonuo
- Dialects: Lingkabau

Language codes
- ISO 639-3: txa
- Glottolog: tomb1244

Tombonuwo (Tambonuo) is a Paitanic language spoken in the Pitas and Labuk-Sugut Districts of northwest Sabah, Malaysia.

== Phonology ==
=== Consonants ===
	Labial	Dental	Alveolar	Palatal	Velar	Glottal
Plosive	p b	t̪	d		k g	ʔ
Fricative			s			
Affricate				dʒ		
Nasal	m		n		ŋ	
Lateral			l			
Tap			ɾ			
Semi-vowel	w			j		

The phonemes /p, t, k, s, ʔ/ are voiceless. All other expressions are voiced.

=== Vowels ===
	Front	Back
High	i	u
Non-high	a	o

/o/ is often pronounced as unrounded [ʌ].

/a/ is neutralized to [ʌ] in a pre-stressed syllable.

== Morphology ==
=== Focus ===
Sabahan languages are characterized by "focus" morphology, which marks a syntactic relationship between the predicate of a clause and the "focused" noun phrase of the clause (see Austronesian alignment).

Tombonuwo has four focus categories, conventionally labelled "actor", "patient", "referent" and "theme". Focus is marked by affixation on the verb.

- Actor: -um- / m(u)-
- Patient: -on (Present tense) / -∅ (Past tense)
- Referent: -an
- Theme: i-

=== Tense and aspect ===
The only marked tense in Tombonuwo is past tense.

- Past tense: n- (-in-)
- Stative: o-
- Perfective: ko-
- Non-volitional past tense: n-o-
- Accomplishment: n-o-ko-

=== Demonstratives ===
- Near the speaker: itu
- Far from the speaker: iri
- Medium distance from the speaker: ono
