= Pitas District =

Pitas District Daerah Pitas
- District
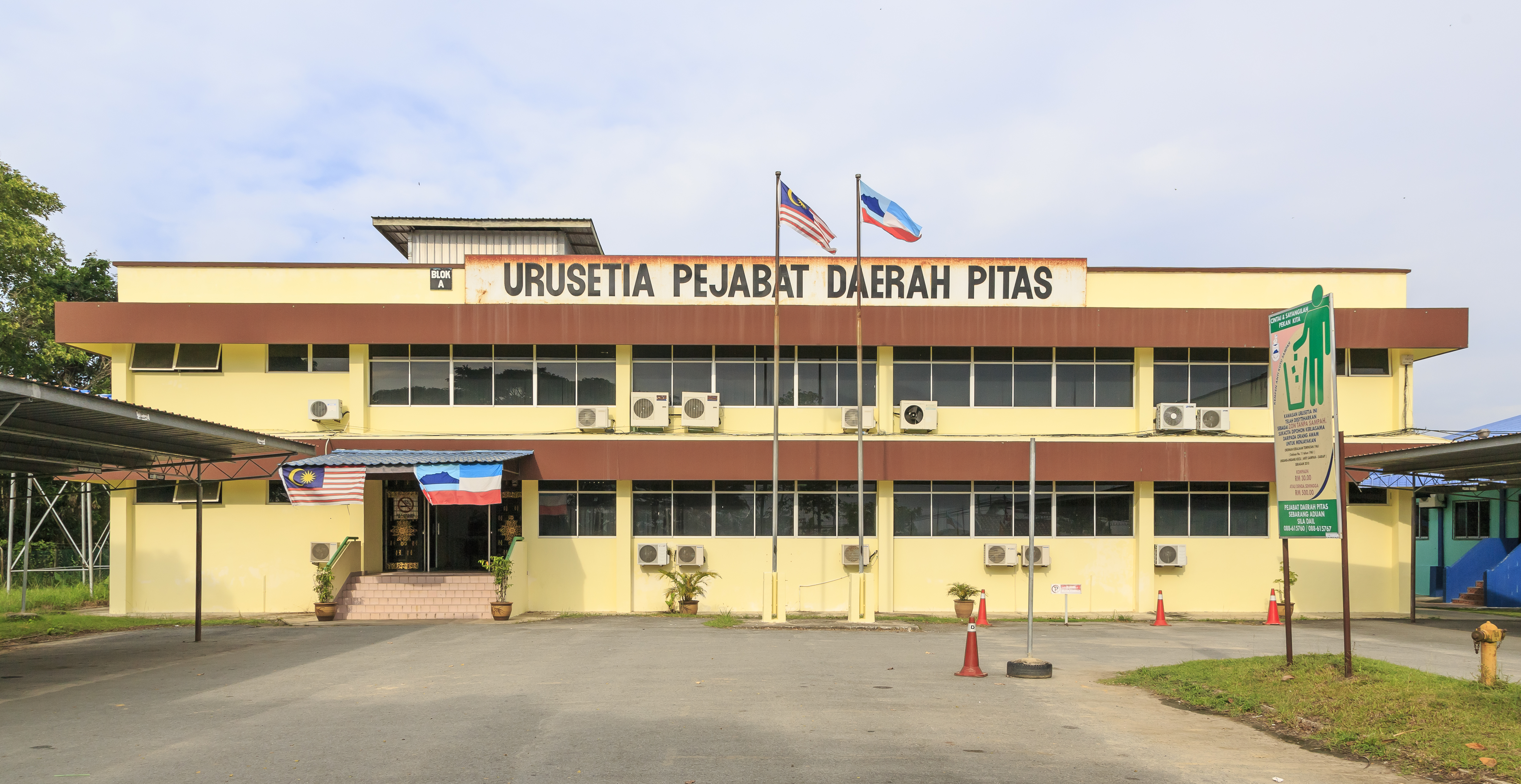
- Pitas District office.

- Seal

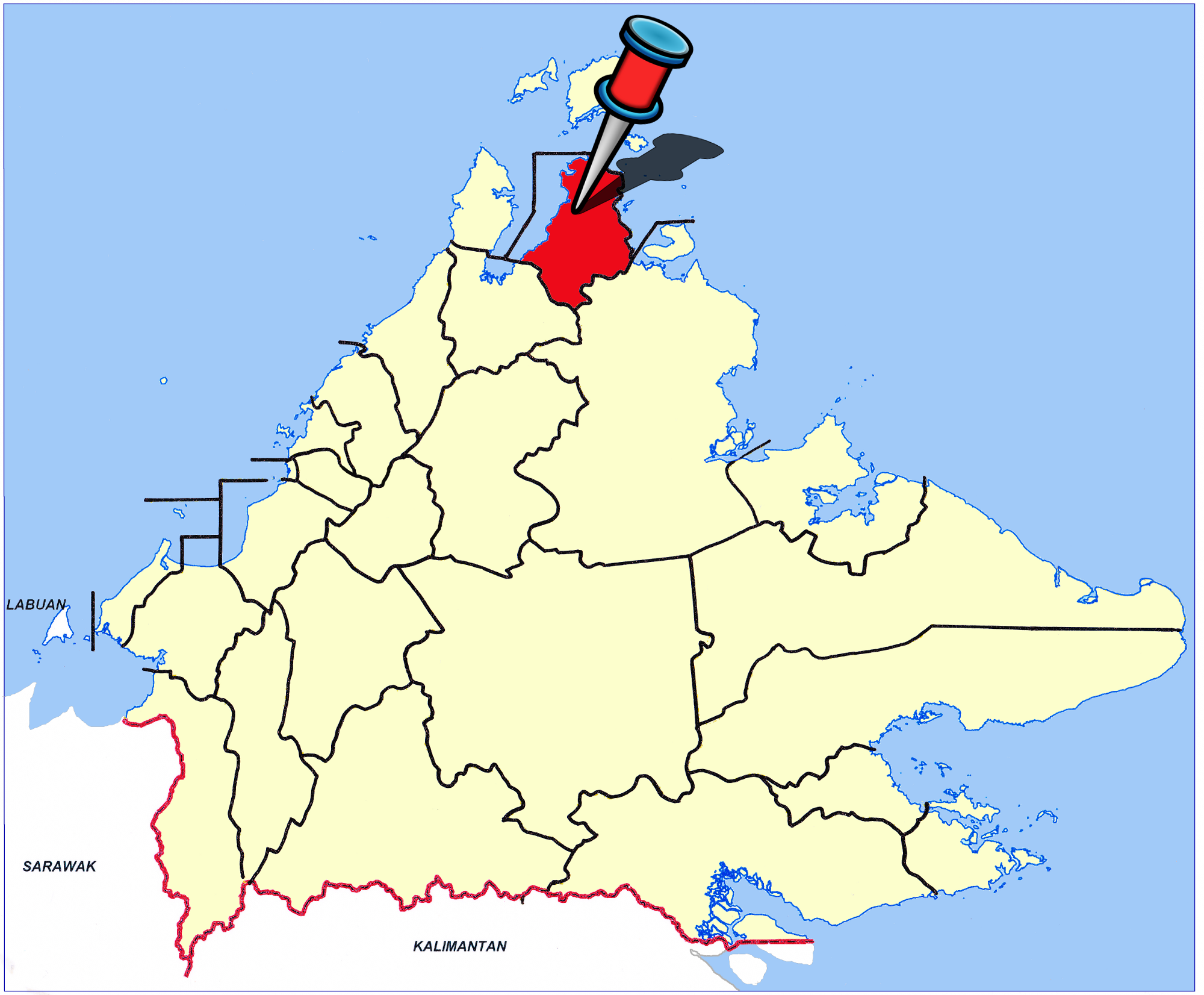
- Coordinates: 6°43′00″N 117°4′00″E
- Country: Malaysia
- State: Sabah
- Division: Kudat
- Capital: Pitas

Government
  - District Officer: Nahalan Mehdunah

Area
  - Total: 1,419 km^{2} (548 sq mi)

Population (2010)
  - Total: 37,808
- Website: mdpitas.sbh.gov.my pdpitas.sbh.gov.my

Map of Pitas District

The Pitas District (Malay: Daerah Pitas) is an administrative district in the Malaysian state of Sabah, part of the Kudat Division which includes the districts of Kota Marudu, Kudat and Pitas. The capital of the district is in Pitas Town.

== Etymology ==
Pitas is derived from the word "Nopitas" of Sungai language which means "lost". The Bengkoka River was once flooded and as a result of the heavy floods the river was cut off. The name subsequently enshrined by the people at the time which became Pitas.

== History ==
The Pitas District was once under the Kudat District Administration where Pitas was only known as a small district until 1974. It was then recognised as a full district the following year. The district office moved several times to a different location before a tragedy struck in 1999 where the district office was totally burned out and most important documents about the district are destroyed.

== Demographics ==
According to the last census in 2010, the population of the district is 37,808 which consists of a majority of Rungus, a sub-group of the Kadazan-Dusun people and Orang Sungai (to which also the Tambanuo is included). As in other districts of Sabah, there are also a significant number of illegal immigrants from the nearby southern Philippines, mainly from the Sulu Archipelago and Mindanao which are not included in the population statistics.

== Gallery ==
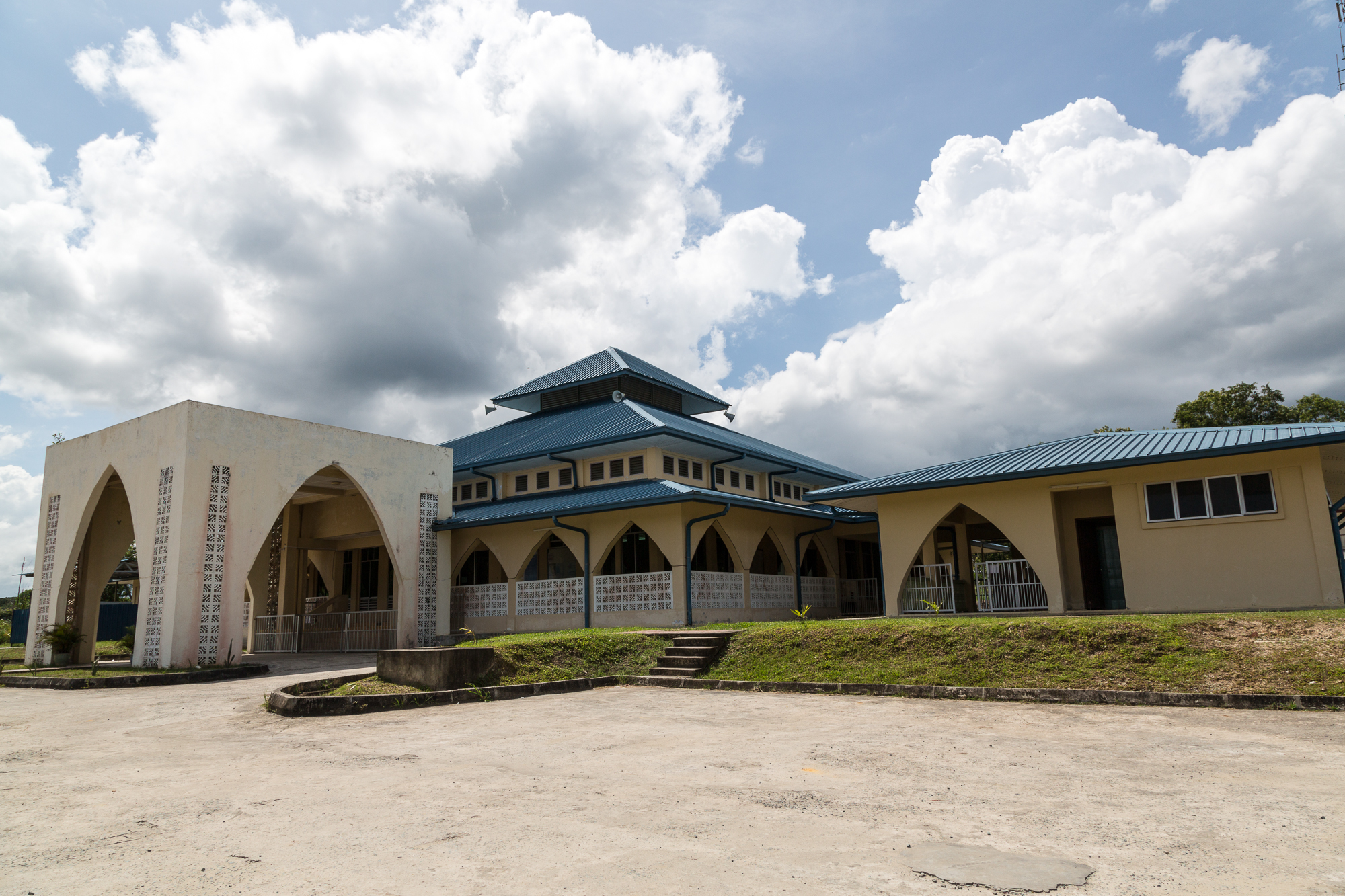
Al Amin Mosque.

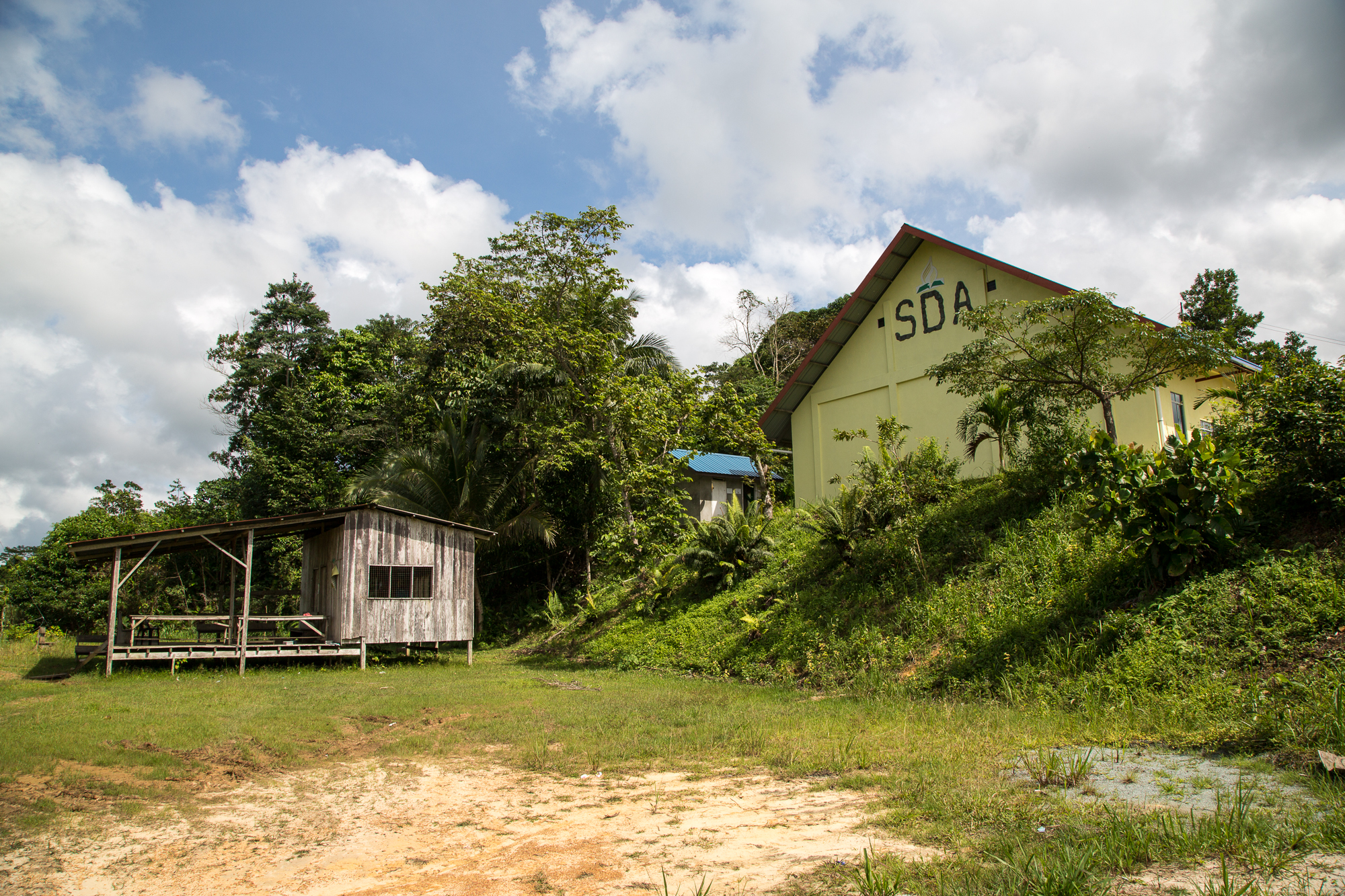
Pitas Seventh Day Adventist Church.

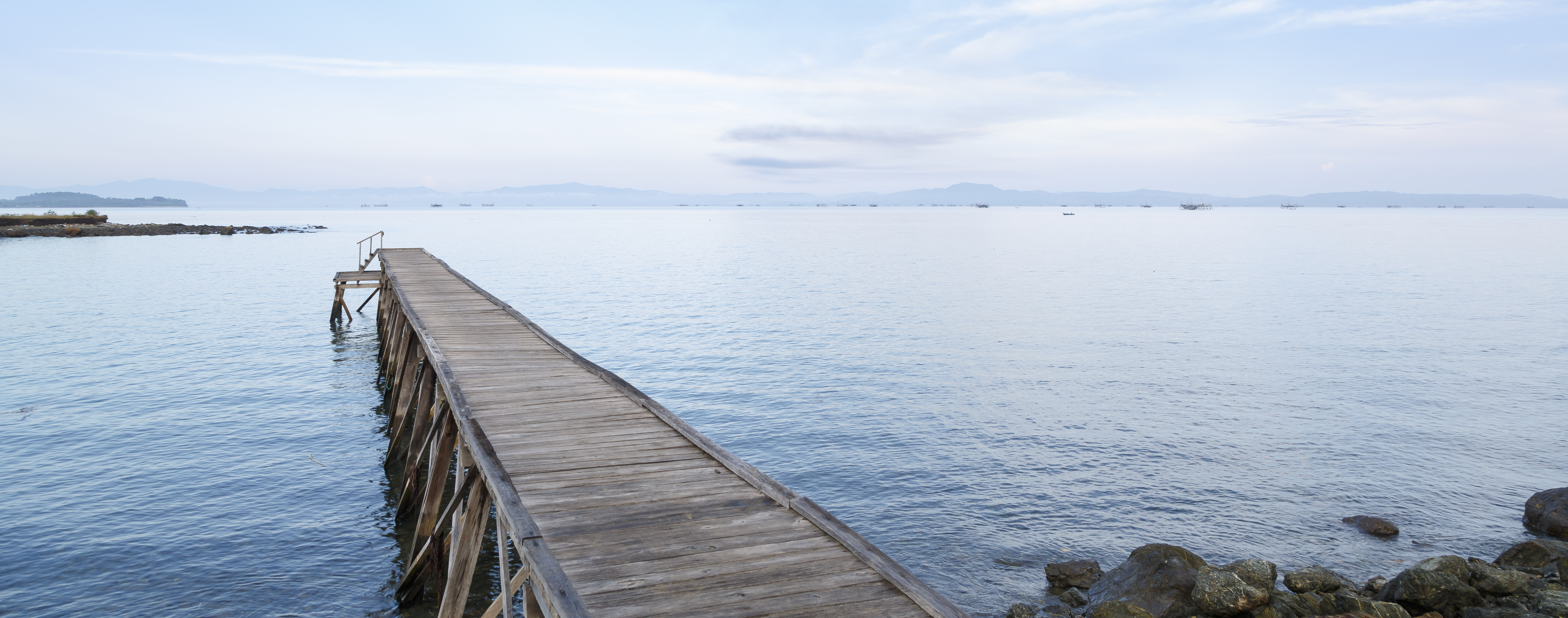
Benkoka Jetty.

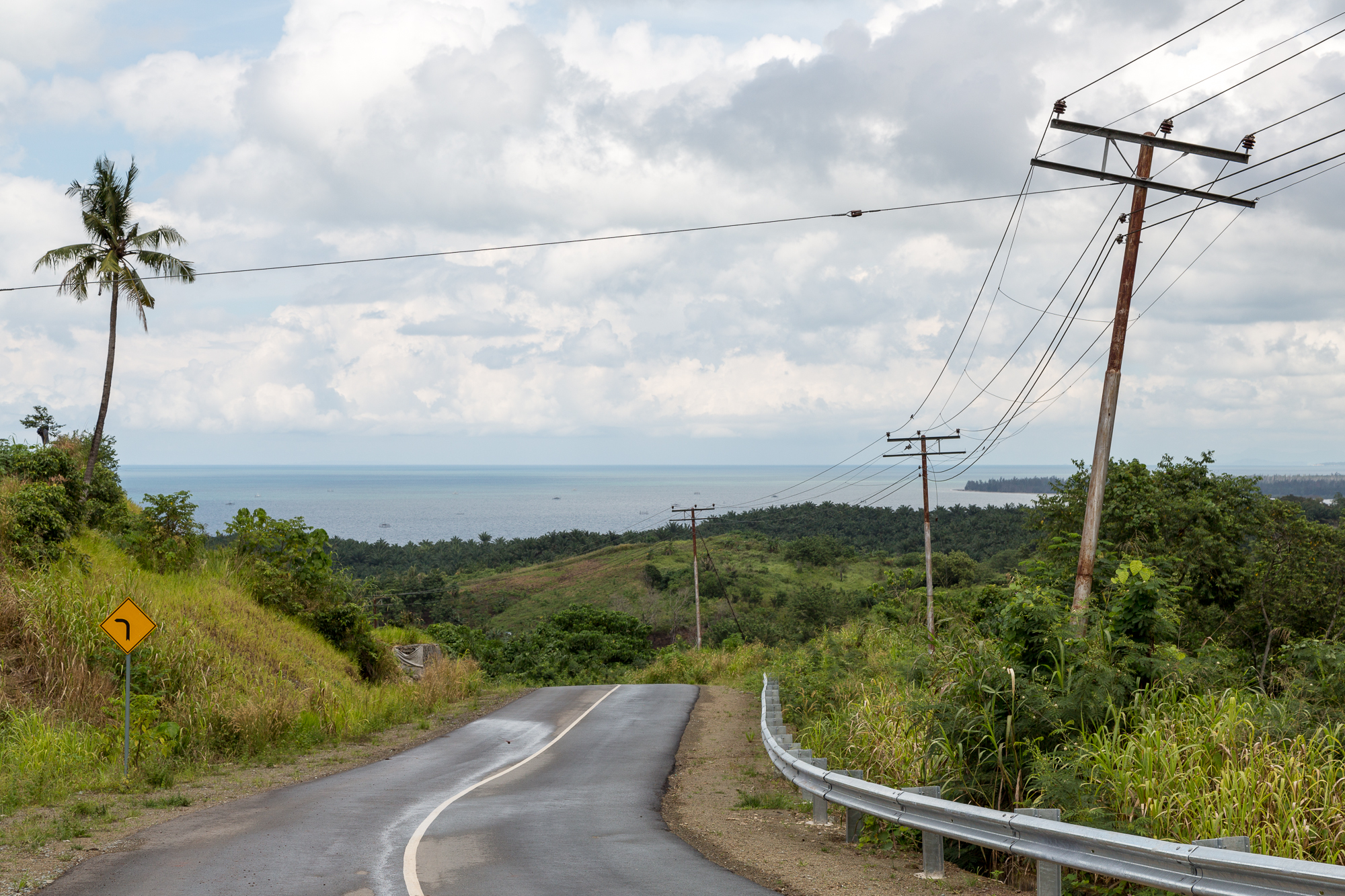
Mempakad facing the Marudu Bay.

== See also ==
- Districts of Malaysia
