= Beluran District =

Beluran District Daerah Beluran
- District
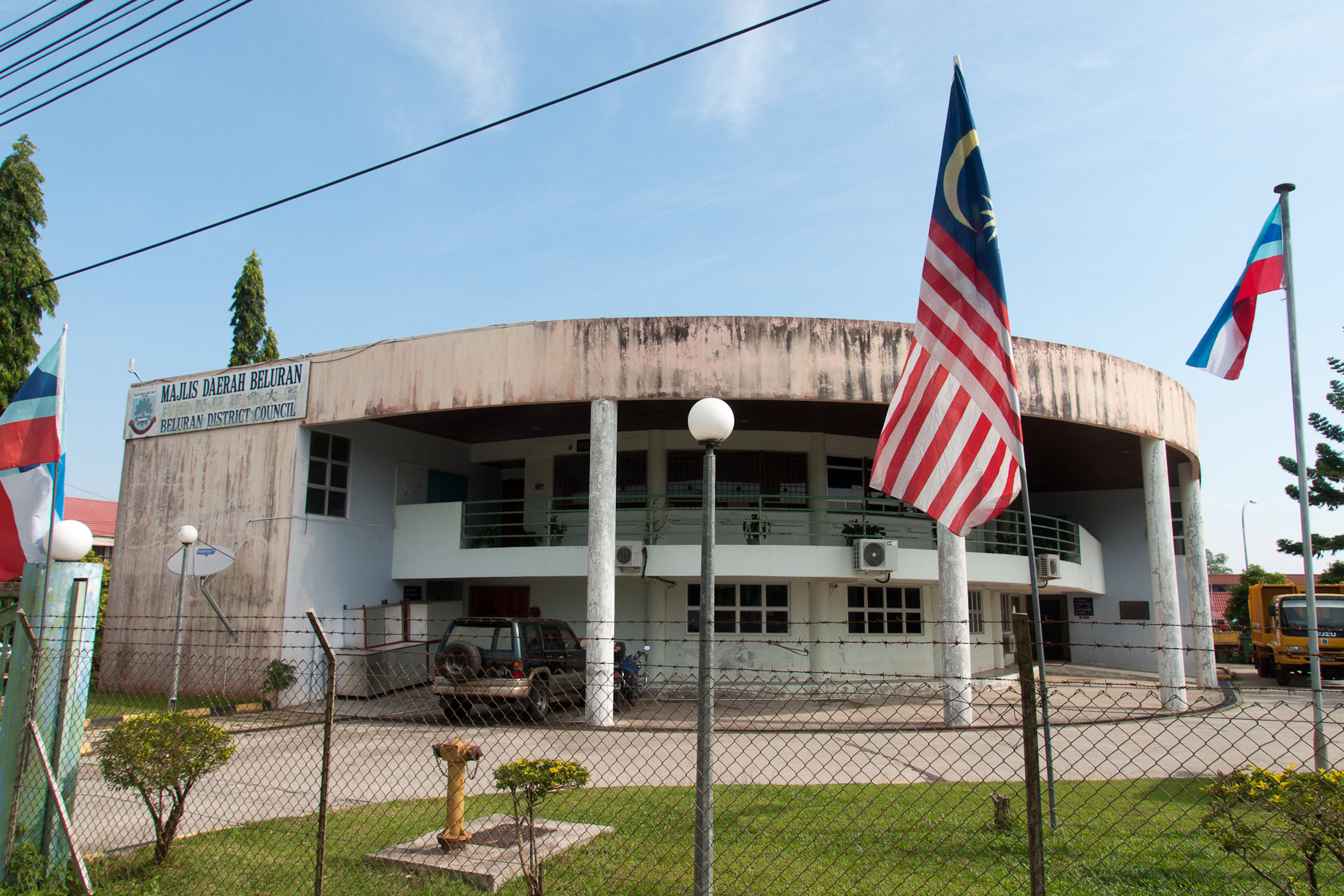
- Beluran District Council office.

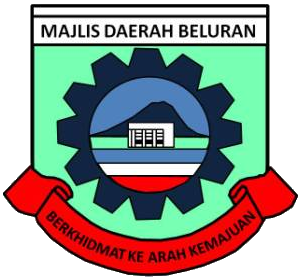
- Seal

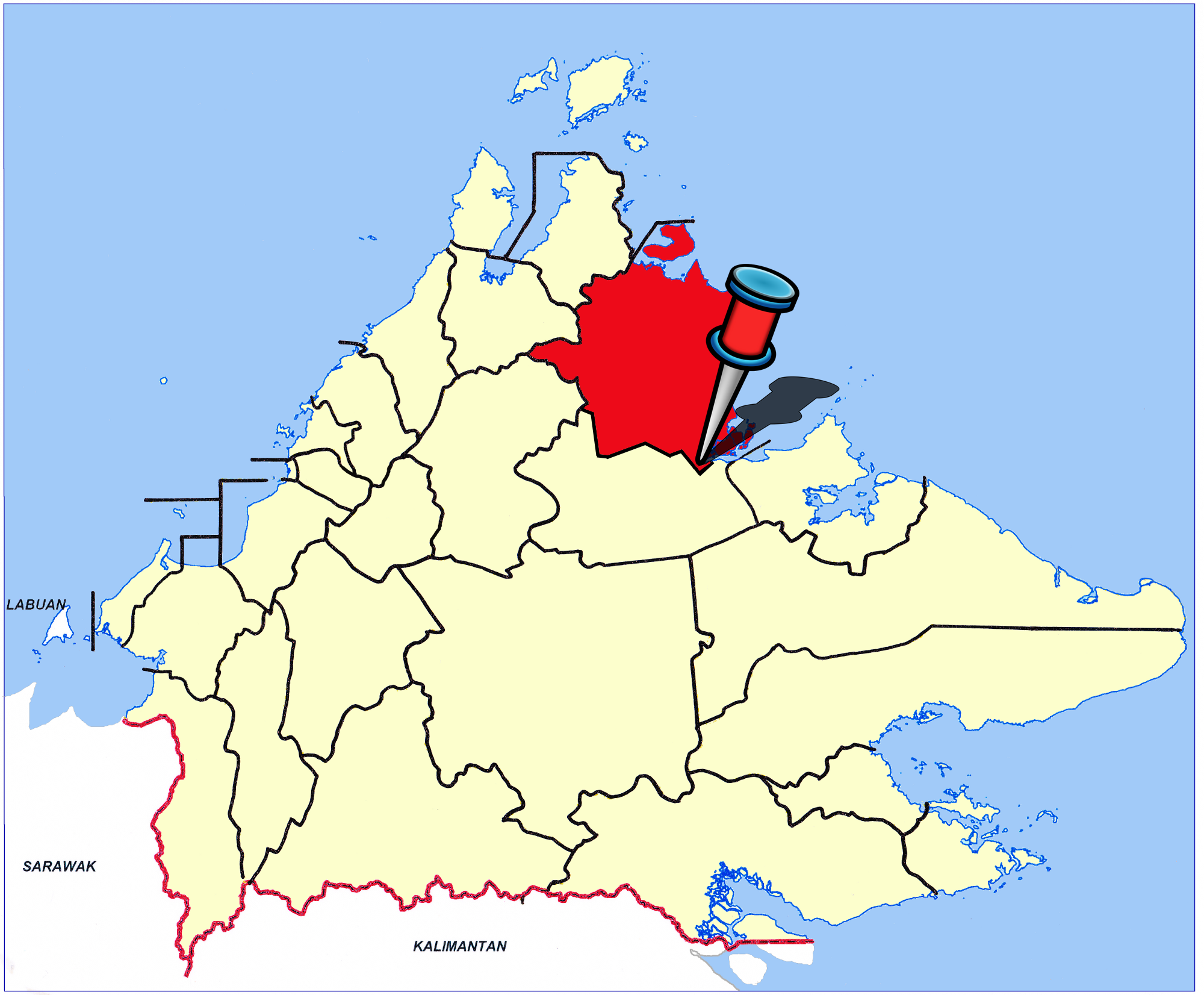
- Coordinates: 5°52′44″N 117°33′43″E
- Country: Malaysia
- State: Sabah
- Division: Sandakan
- Capital: Beluran

Government
  - District Officer: Roger Appolonius

Area
  - Total: 8,345 km^{2} (3,222 sq mi)

Population (2010)
  - Total: 104,484
- Website: mdbeluran.sbh.gov.my pdbeluran.sbh.gov.my

Map of Beluran District

Beluran District Council Majlis Daerah Beluran
- Local Government Act 1976
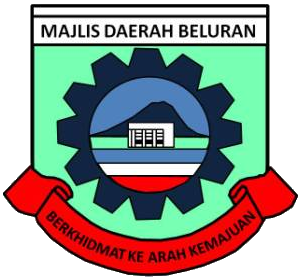

Type
- Type: Municipal council of Beluran

History
- Founded: 1972

Leadership
- District Officer: Roger Appolonius

Website
- www.mdbeluran.sabah.gov.my

The Beluran District (Malay: Daerah Beluran) is an administrative district in the Malaysian state of Sabah, part of the Sandakan Division which includes the districts of Beluran, Kinabatangan, Sandakan, Telupid and Tongod. The capital of the district is in Beluran Town.

== Etymology ==
The name Beluran was taken after the name of a hill in the district. In the languages of Labuk Dusun, Sungai and Tidong, it is called as "Buludan". Several changes occurred during the British administration as a result of misnomeration by British colonial officials who does not speak fluent local languages causing the name "Buludan" became "Beluran" which later maintained until this day.

== History ==
The district is formerly known as the Labuk-Sugut District and has existed since the North Borneo Chartered Company administration. It is one of the earliest districts in North Borneo. The Beluran District Administration Office was established as early as 1916 but all records and data of the district were destroyed in the Second World War. According to some old sources, B.S Willie was appointed as Beluran District Officer in 1945 with Klagan became the first administrative district of Labuk-Sugut District, but as the area was often flooded, the British authorities transferred the administrative centre to the foothills of present-day Beluran.

== Demographics ==
According to the latest census in 2010, the population of the district is estimated to be around 104,484 inhabitants. The population consists of a mixture of various indigenous ethnic groups, such as Kadazan-Dusun, Tidong, Bajau, Suluk, Orang Sungai as well as a significant presence of Chinese. As in other districts of Sabah, there are a significant number of illegal immigrants from the nearby southern Philippines, mainly from the Sulu Archipelago and Mindanao of whom are not included in the population statistics.

== Gallery ==
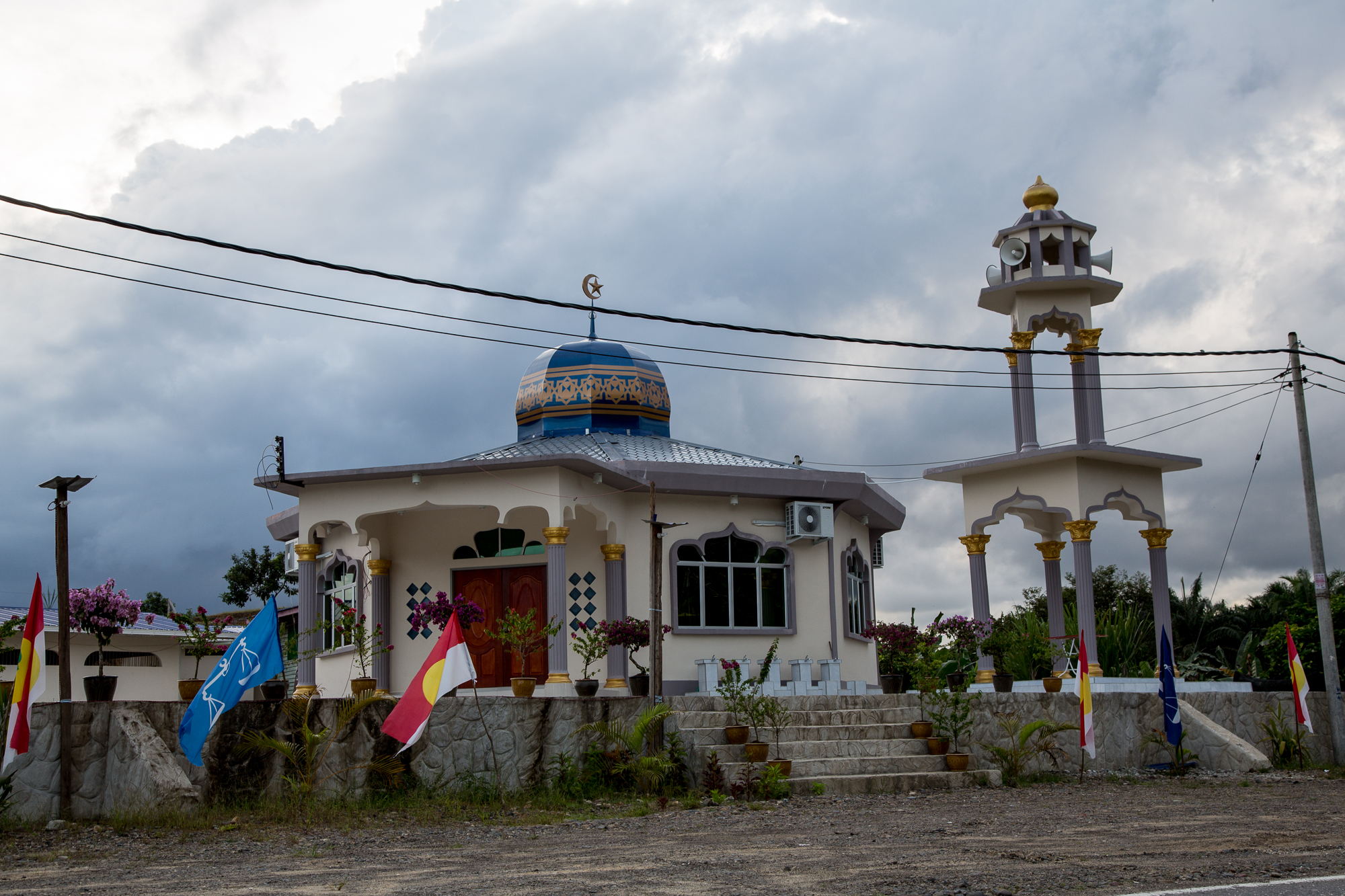
Beluran District Mosque.

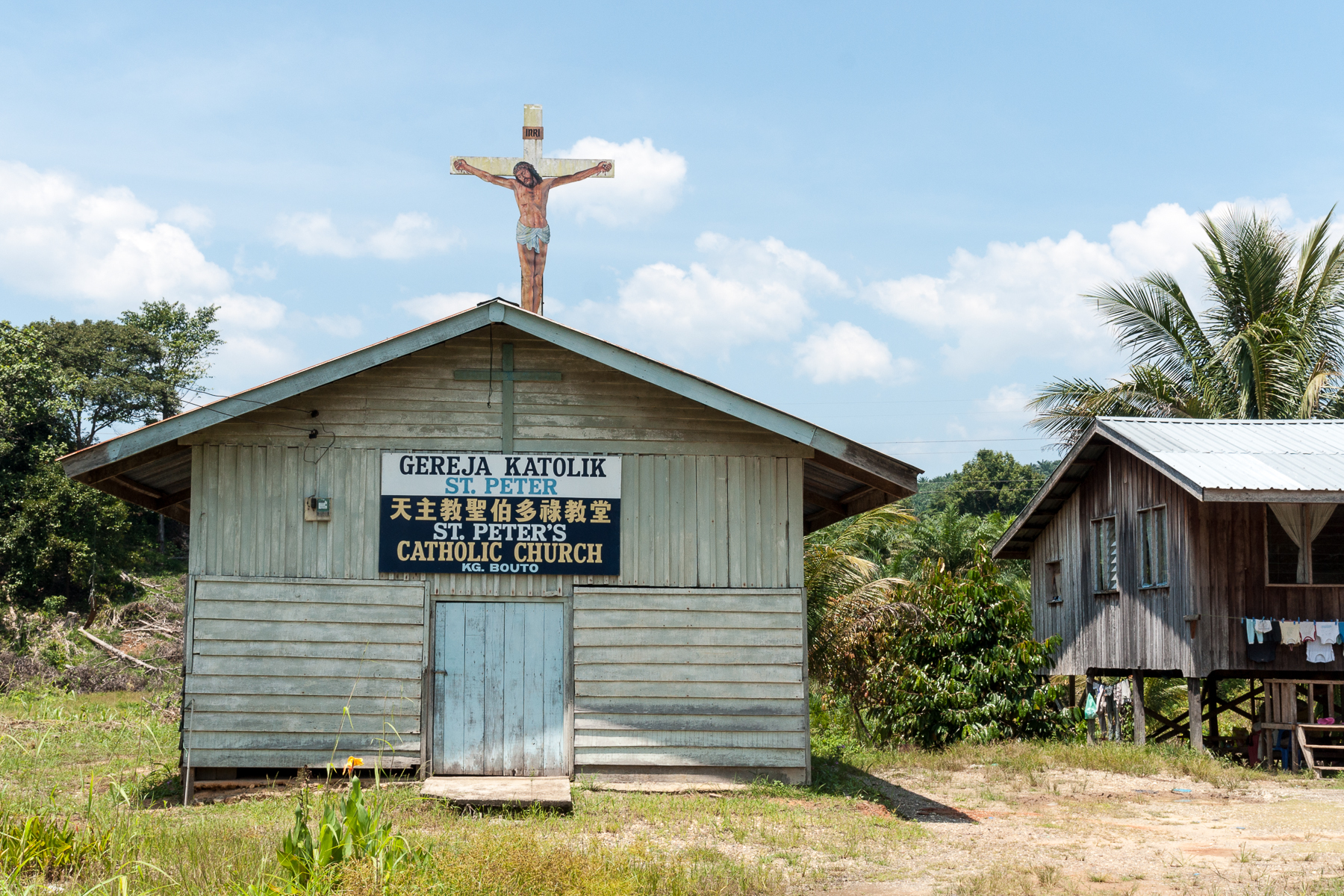
St. Peter Catholic Church.

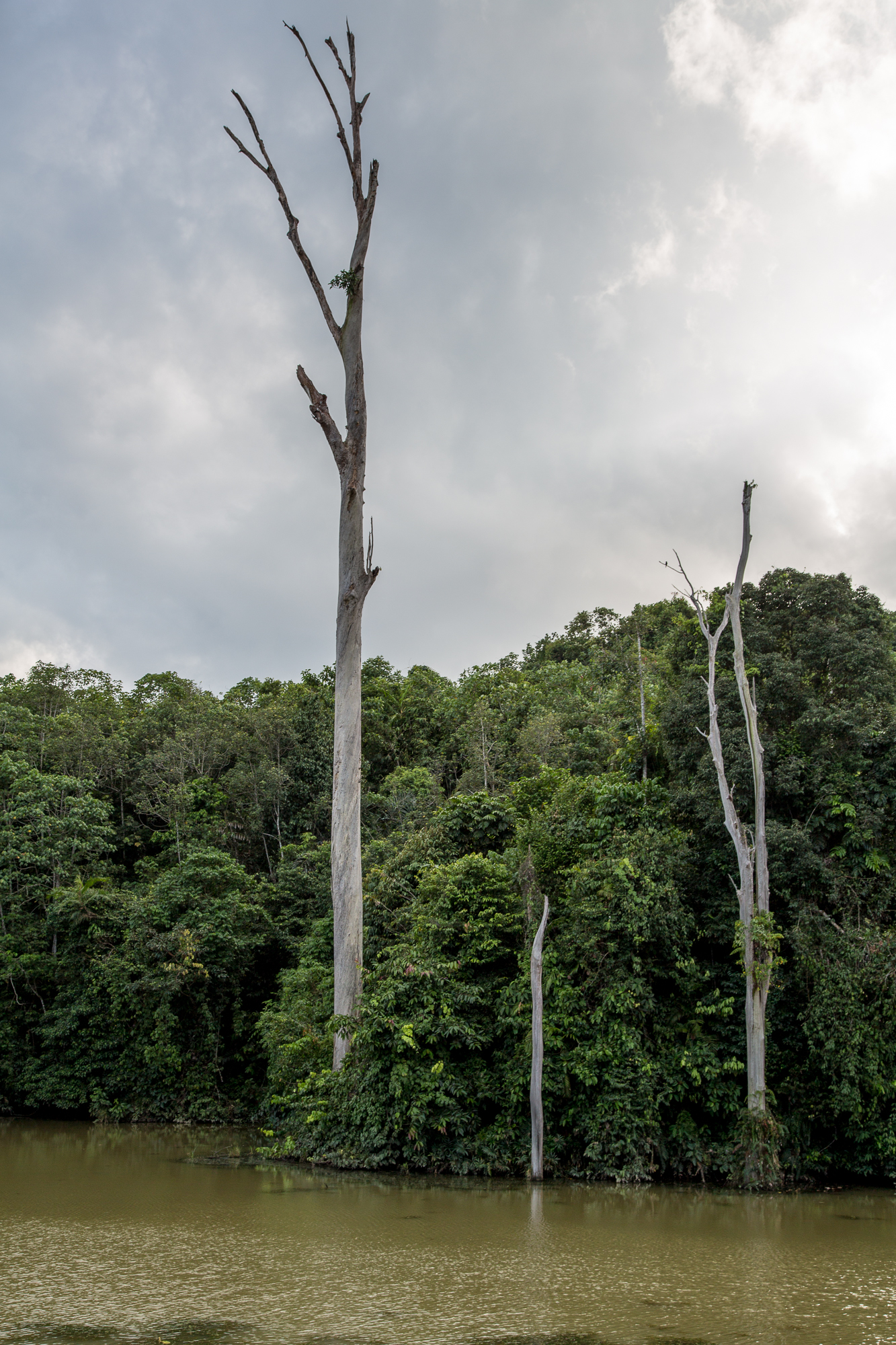
Beluran virgin jungle.

== See also ==
- Districts of Malaysia
