= Languages of Malaysia =

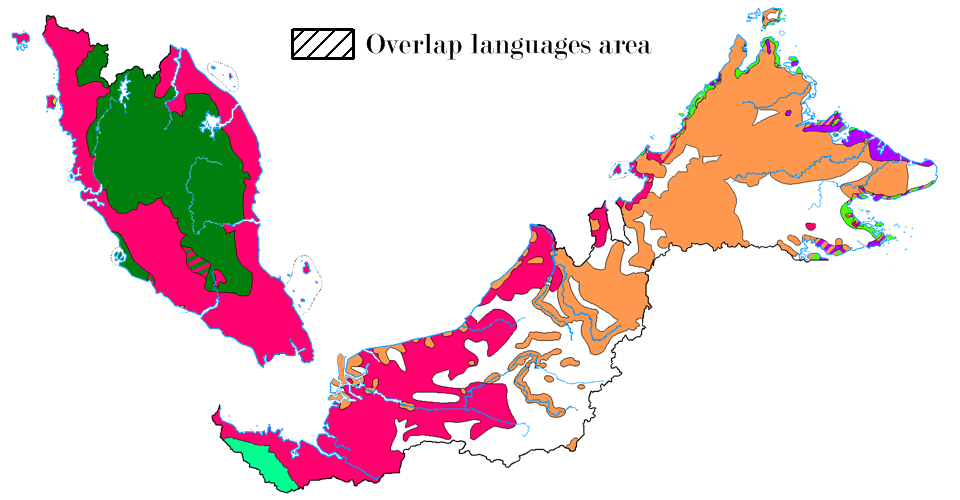
- The distribution of language families of Malaysia shown by colours: Malayic; North Bornean and Melanau-Kajang; Aslian; Land Dayak; Sama–Bajaw; Philippine; Creole; Areas with multiple languages
- Official: Malaysian Malay
- National: Malaysian Malay
- Main: Malay, English, Chinese, Tamil
- Indigenous: List: West Malaysia: Baba Malay, Batek, Chitty Malay, Cheq Wong, Duano’, Jah Hut, Jahai, Jakun, Jedek, Kedah Malay, Kelantan-Pattani Malay, Kenaboi, Kensiu, Kintaq, Kristang, Lanoh, Mah Meri, Minriq, Mintil, Mos, Negeri Sembilan Malay, Orang Kanaq, Orang Seletar, Pahang Malay, Perak Malay, Ple-Temer, Rawa Malay, Reman Malay, Sabüm, Semai, Semaq Beri, Semelai, Semnam, Temiar, Temoq, Temuan, Terengganu Malay, Tioman Malay, Wila' East Malaysia: Abai, Bahau, Bajaw, Belait, Berawan, Biatah, Bintulu, Bonggi, Bookan, Bruneian/Kedayan Malay, Brunei Bisaya, Bukar Sadong, Bukitan, Coastal Kadazan, Cocos Malay, Daro-Matu, Dumpas, Dusun, Eastern Kadazan, Gana’, Iban, Ida'an, Iranun, Jagoi, Jangkang, Kajaman, Kalabakan, Kanowit, Kayan, Kelabit, Kendayan, Keningau Murut, Kinabatangan, Kiput, Klias River Kadazan, Kota Marudu Talantang, Kuijau, Lahanan, Lelak, Lengilu, Lotud, Lun Bawang (Lundayeh), Mainstream Kenyah, Melanau, Molbog, Momogun, Murik Kayan, Narom, Nonukan Tidong, Okolod, Paluan, Papar, Punan Batu, Remun, Sa'ban, Sabah Bisaya, Sabah Malay, Sama, Sarawak Malay, Sebop, Sekapan, Selungai Murut, Sembakung, Seru, Serudung, Sian, Suluk, Sungai, Tagol, Timugon, Tombonuwo, Tring, Tringgus, Tutoh, Ukit, Uma’ Lasan
- Vernacular: Colloquial Malaysian (Bahasa Rojak), Manglish
- Minority: Acehnese, Banjar, Bengali, Bugis, Cham, Gujarati, Hindustani, Javanese, Kerinci, Malayalam, Mandailing, Marathi, Minangkabau, Punjabi, Southern Thai, Telugu
- Foreign: Arabic, Filipino, French, Burmese, German, Indonesian, Italian, Japanese, Khmer, Korean, Persian, Portuguese, Spanish, Swahili, Vietnamese, Thai, Tetum, Turkish
- Signed: Malaysian Sign Language
- Keyboard layout: QWERTY

The indigenous languages of Malaysia belong to the Mon-Khmer and Malayo-Polynesian families. The national, or official, language is Malay which is the mother tongue of the majority Malay ethnic group. The main ethnic groups within Malaysia are the Bumiputera (which consist of Malays, Orang Asli, and, natives of East Malaysia), Arab Malaysians, Malaysian Chinese and Malaysian Indians, with many other ethnic groups represented in smaller numbers, each with their own languages. The largest native languages spoken in East Malaysia are the Iban, Dusunic, and Kadazan languages. English is widely understood and spoken within the urban areas of the country; the English language is a compulsory subject in primary and secondary education. It is also the main medium of instruction within most private colleges and private universities. English may take precedence over Malay in certain official contexts as provided for by the National Language Act, especially in the states of Sabah and Sarawak, where it may be the official working language. Furthermore, the law of Malaysia is commonly taught and read in English, as the unwritten laws of Malaysia continue to be partially derived from pre-1957 English common law, which is a legacy of past British colonisation of the constituents forming Malaysia. In addition, authoritative versions of constitutional law and statutory law (written laws of Malaysia) are continuously available in both Malay and English.

Malaysia contains speakers of 137 living languages, 41 of which are found in Peninsular Malaysia. The government provides schooling at the primary level in each of the three major languages, Malay, Mandarin and Tamil. Within Malay and Tamil there are a number of dialectal differences. There are a number of Chinese languages native to the ethnic Han Chinese who originated from Southern China, which include Yue, Min and Hakka Chinese.

== Malay ==
The official language of Malaysia is the "Malay language" (Bahasa Melayu) which is sometimes interchangeable with "Malaysian language" (Bahasa Malaysia). The standard language is promoted as a unifying symbol for the nation across all ethnicities, linked to the concept of Bangsa Malaysia (lit. 'Malaysian Nation'). The status as a national language is codified in Article 152 of the constitution, further strengthened by the passage of the National Language Act 1963/67. This standard Malay is often a second language following use of related Malayic languages spoken within Malaysia (excluding the Ibanic) identified by local scholars as "dialects" (loghat), 10 of which are used throughout Malaysia. A variant of Malay that is spoken in Brunei is also commonly spoken in East Malaysia. After the 13 May Incident, English as the main kindergarten to university-level national education medium was gradually replaced with Malay since the 1970s. The Education Act of 1996 reiterates that Malay is to be "the main medium of instruction in all educational institutions in the National Education System", with certain exceptions.

== Other indigenous languages ==
Citizens of Minangkabau, Bugis or Javanese origins, who can be classified as "Malay" under constitutional definitions, may speak their respective ancestral tongues alongside Malay. The native tribes of East Malaysia have their own languages, which are related to but easily distinguishable from Malay. Iban is the main tribal language in Sarawak, while the Dusun and Kadazan languages are spoken by the natives in Sabah. Some of these languages remain strong, being used in education and daily life. Sabah has ten other sub-ethnic languages: Bajau, Bruneian, Murut, Lundayeh/Lun Bawang, Rungus, Bisaya, Iranun, Sama, Suluk and Sungai. There are over 30 native ethnic groups, each of which has its own dialect. These languages are in danger of dying out unlike the major ones such as Kadazan-Dusun, which have developed educational syllabuses. Iban also has developed an educational syllabus. Languages on the peninsula can be divided into three major groups: Negrito, Senoi, and Malayic, further divided into 18 subgroups. The Semai language is used in education. Thai is also spoken in northern parts of the peninsula, especially in northern Langkawi and mainland Kedah, Perlis, northern Perak, northern Terengganu, and northern Kelantan.

A lot of efforts are being taken to preserve the endangered indigenous languages, such as Wikimedia Malaysia and International Islamic University Malaysia's WikiKata project which documents the languages on online platforms such as Wiktionary, as well as media channels like radio and newspaper being published in the indigenous languages. Nevertheless, some Orang Asli languages have died out such as 'Low Country Semang' formerly spoken in Penang.

== English ==
Malaysian English, also known as Malaysian Standard English (MySE), is a form of English derived from British English, although there is little official use of the term except with relation to education. Malaysian English differs little from standard British English.

The law of constituent regions that make up the Federation of Malaya and later Malaysia is commonly taught and read in English, as the unwritten laws of Malaysia continues to be partially derived from pre-1957 English common law, which is a legacy of past British authority in Malaysia's preceding colonies. In addition, authoritative versions of constitutional law and statutory law (written laws of Malaysia) are continuously available in both Malay and English. During colonial times, English was a medium of education for prestigious colonial-run schools concentrated in urban areas across Malaya, yet were far from reach of many rural Malay populations living as farmers in kampungs (see Education in Malaysia).

=== Use in politics after independence ===
English was used in the Parliament briefly upon independence (then as Federation of Malaya), prior to a gradual and complete transition to the Malay language in 1969; special permission is granted for use of it in vocalizing specific terminologies in parlimentary debates. English remains an official language in the State Legislative Assemblies and Courts of Sabah and Sarawak.

As the scheduled date in 1967, drew near some extremists Chinese began to agitate for a more liberal language policy permitting some instances of Mandarin in public affairs. Conservatives from UMNO and PAS lashed out against them, but other members in the Alliance coalition proposed a compromise in the National Language Bill establishing Malay as the official language, but permitting English under certain circumstances and the use of non-Malay languages for non-official purposes. Tunku Abdul Rahman leadimg the coaltion described it as "a course guaranteeing peace", but the Bill was widely derided by many Malays, who formed the National Language Action Front in hope of repealing or amending it. The leadership of the Tunku was also openly questioned.

The federal constitution provides that English would continue to serve as an official language for at least 10 years after Merdeka until the parliament provides otherwise. The passage of the National Language Act re-iterated the primacy of Malay as an official language for most official purposes, however the act provides for the use of English in certain official contexts. Among these, section 5 provides that English may be used in the parliament and state assemblies with the presiding officer's permission. Article 152(3) of the constitution and sections 6–7 of the National Language Act provide that all federal and state laws must be enacted in Malay and English.

The Malaysia Agreement, provided for the continued use of English in Sabah and Sarawak for any official purpose. Under article 161(3) of the constitution, federal legislation affecting the use of English in Sabah and Sarawak would not become law in these states unless approved by their respective legislative assemblies. Sarawak has not adopted the National Language Act as of 2023; meanwhile Sabah amended its constitution in 1973 to provide for Malay as "the official language of the state cabinet and assembly", and passed the National Language (Application) Enactment 1973 which approved the adoption of National Language Act in Sabah.

=== Tension in education spheres ===
The debate to which degree English is maintained in the independent Malaysian education system is a polarizing situation among two sides: opposition to pervasive use of English is historically rooted in late 1940-1950s early Malay nationalism (spearheaded by Malay-language literary associations) where opponents see English as a elitist, colonial-imposed class marker that disparages the Malay rural working class, proponents argue of its crucial skill for academic achievement and global business. The National University of Malaysia was established with an explicit goal as a national higher educational institution using Malay as the primary medium of teaching compared to available institutions like University of Malaya that retained English as its medium. English served as the medium of instruction for Maths and Sciences in all public schools per the highly unpopular PPSMI policy, but reverted to Bahasa Malaysia in national schools and vernacular-type schools in 2012. The Parent Action Group for Education and former Prime Minister Mahathir Mohamad has called for science and maths to be taught in English again.

Malaysian English also sees wide usage in business, along with Manglish, which is a colloquial form of English with heavy Malay, Chinese, and Tamil influences. Many Malaysians (particularly those who live in urban areas) are conversant in English, although some are only fluent in the Manglish form. The Malaysian government officially discourages the use of Manglish. Many businesses in Malaysia conduct their transactions in English, and it is sometimes used in official correspondence.

== Chinese language and regiolects ==
As a whole, Standard Chinese (Mandarin) and its Malaysian dialect are the most widely spoken forms among Malaysian Chinese, as it is a lingua franca for Chinese who speak mutually unintelligible varieties; Mandarin is also the language of instruction in Chinese schools and an important language in business.

As most Malaysian Chinese have ancestry from the southern provinces of China, various southern Chinese varieties are spoken in Malaysia (in addition to Standard Chinese (Mandarin) which originated from northern China and was introduced through the educational system. The more common forms in Peninsular Malaysia are Hokkien, Cantonese, Hakka, Hainanese, Teochew, and Hokchew. Hokkien is mostly spoken in Penang, Kedah, Perlis, Klang, Johor, Northern Perak, Southwest Perak, Port Dickson, Southern Negeri Sembilan, Kelantan, Terengganu, and Malacca, whereas Cantonese is mostly spoken in Ipoh, Kuala Lumpur, Seremban and Kuantan. In Sarawak, most ethnic Chinese speak Hokkien, Hokchew, or Hakka. Hakka predominates in Sabah except in the city of Sandakan where Cantonese is more frequently spoken despite the Hakka origins of the Chinese residing there.

As with Malaysian youths of other ethnicities, most Chinese youth are multilingual and can speak at least three languages with at least moderate fluency – Mandarin, English, and Malay, as well as their Chinese regiolect and/or the dominant Chinese regiolect in their area. However, most Chinese regiolects are losing ground to Mandarin, due to its prestige and use as the language of instruction in Chinese vernacular schools. Some parents speak exclusively in Mandarin with their children. Some of the less-spoken regiolects, such as Hainanese, are facing extinction.

== Tamil ==
Tamil and its Malaysian dialect are used predominantly by Tamils, who form a majority of Malaysian Indians. It is especially used in Peninsular Malaysia. The Education Act of 1996 regulates the use of Tamil as medium of instruction at the primary level in "national-type schools", and also entitles Tamil children to obtain Tamil classes in national primary schools and national secondary schools (which use Malay as medium of instruction), provided "it is reasonable and practicable so to do and if the parents of at least fifteen pupils in the school so request".

Tamil-speaking immigrants to Malaysia came from two groups, Sri Lankan Tamils who spoke Sri Lankan Tamil dialects such as the Jaffna Tamil dialect, and Indian Tamils who spoke dialect from Tamil Nadu. These dialects reflected class differences, with the Sri Lankan Tamils being more educated and overseeing the Indian Tamils, who primarily served as labourers on rubber estates. These two communities with their very different dialects remained mostly separate in Malaysia, forming two separate Tamil communities. Tamil is becoming less common among the more highly educated Tamil population, being predominantly replaced by English, and in a minority by Malay. Tamil-medium schools are considered less advantageous than English-medium schools, bringing little prospect of socioeconomic advancement. While the Malaysian government provides limited support for elementary Tamil schooling, secondary school is only taught in Malay, and there are no Tamil private schools. Usage of Tamil remains common among the less educated Tamil community, who often continue to live in their own communities on or near plantations, or in urban squatter settlements.

One small group of former Tamil speakers, the Chitty, almost entirely speak Malay.

== Other Indian languages ==
The Malayalees in Malaysia are known to be the second largest Indian ethnicity, after the Tamils. Malayalees can be found in the West Coast states, mostly in Penang, Perak, Selangor, Negeri Sembilan, Malacca and Johore. They can be classified into three major groups: labourers, traders and government servants and estate clerks. Malayalee labourers were predominantly Hindus from Palakkad and Cannannore regions in Malabar. These communities spoke South Malabar dialect and Kannur dialect. Some of the labourers who were not associated with the Kangani system were placed in estates that had mix ethnicities, mostly Tamils. Thus, these labourers mix around with the Tamils and eventually used Tamil vocabularies in their language. Some have even received formal Tamil education, which eventually lead them to not speaking Malayalam as their first language but Tamil. The Malayalam-speaking traders who came to Malaya were mostly from the Muslim communities in Malabar. They spoke the Moplah dialect, which has influence of Arabic and Persian language. This particular dialect is still used among today's Malabari Muslims. Besides, Malayalees who were employed as estate clerks and semi-professional positions in the Malayan Civil Service consists of Hindus and Christians from Cochin and Travancore, as they were educated. These people spoke Malayalam dialects which are similar to the standard Malayalam spoken today. Many youngsters of the Malayalee community are unable to speak their mother tongue fluently because of the usage of English among the educated urban Malayalees and the domination of Tamil, as a lingua franca of the Malaysian Indians. Today, there are roughly more than 200,000 Malayalam speakers in Malaysia.

Other South Asian languages such as Bengali, Gujarati, Hindi, Kannada, Marathi, Nepali, Odia, Punjabi, Sindhi, Sinhala, Telugu, and Urdu are also spoken.

== Creoles ==
A small number of Malaysians have Eurasian ancestry and speak creole languages, such as the Portuguese-based Malaccan Creoles. A Spanish-based creole, Zamboangueño Chavacano, has spread into Sabah from migrants of Mindanao and Basilan in southern Philippines.

Other creoles and mixed languages were influenced from Sinitic languages like Baba Malay, Kelantanese Hokkien and Terengganuan Hokkien.

== Sign languages ==
Sign languages include Malaysian Sign Language and the older Selangor Sign Language and Penang Sign Language. No sign language is used in the education of the deaf. Instead, Manually Coded Malay is used.

== List of languages ==
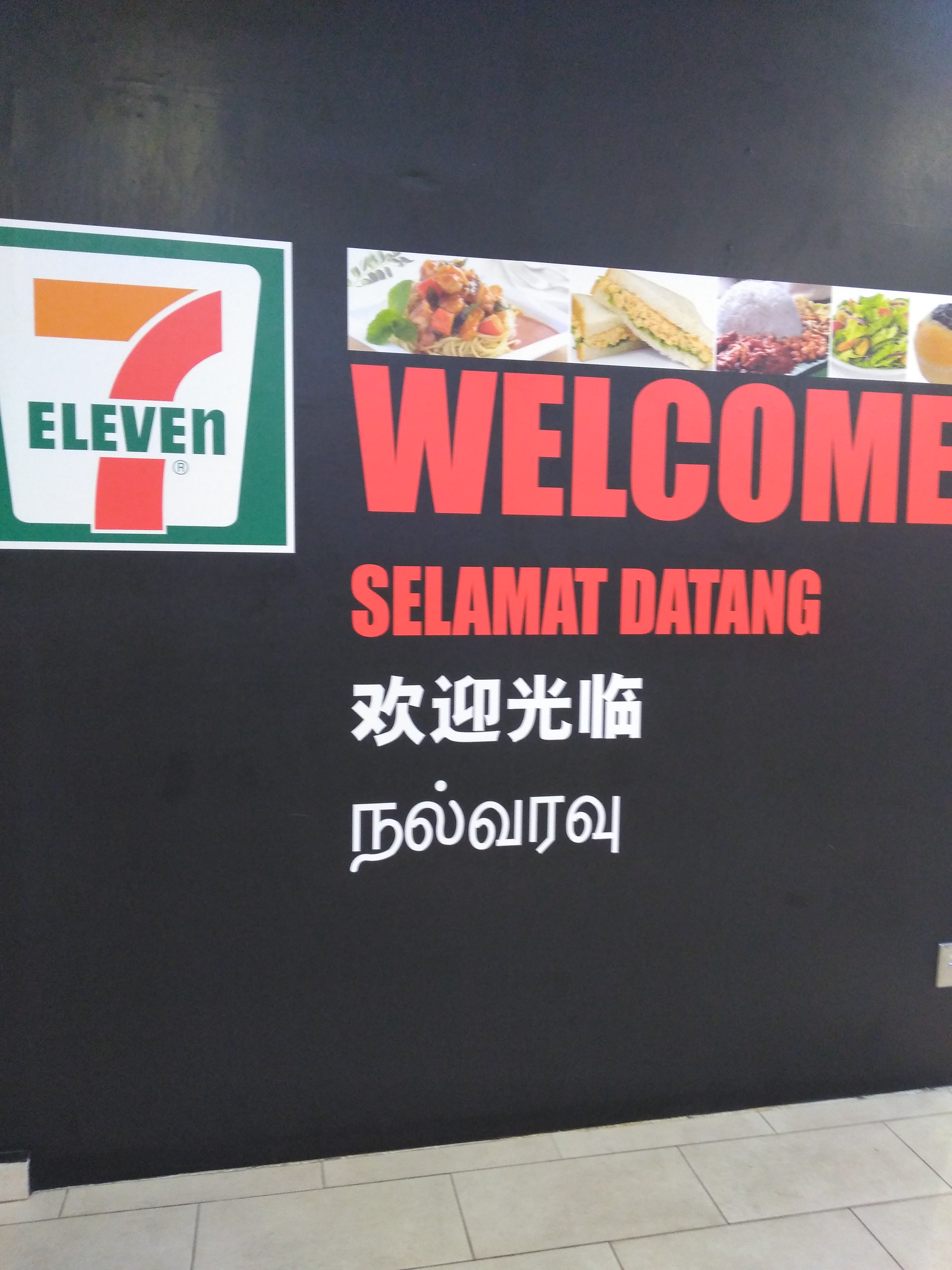
A sign at 7-Eleven stores showing common languages in Malaysia: English, Malay, Chinese, and Tamil

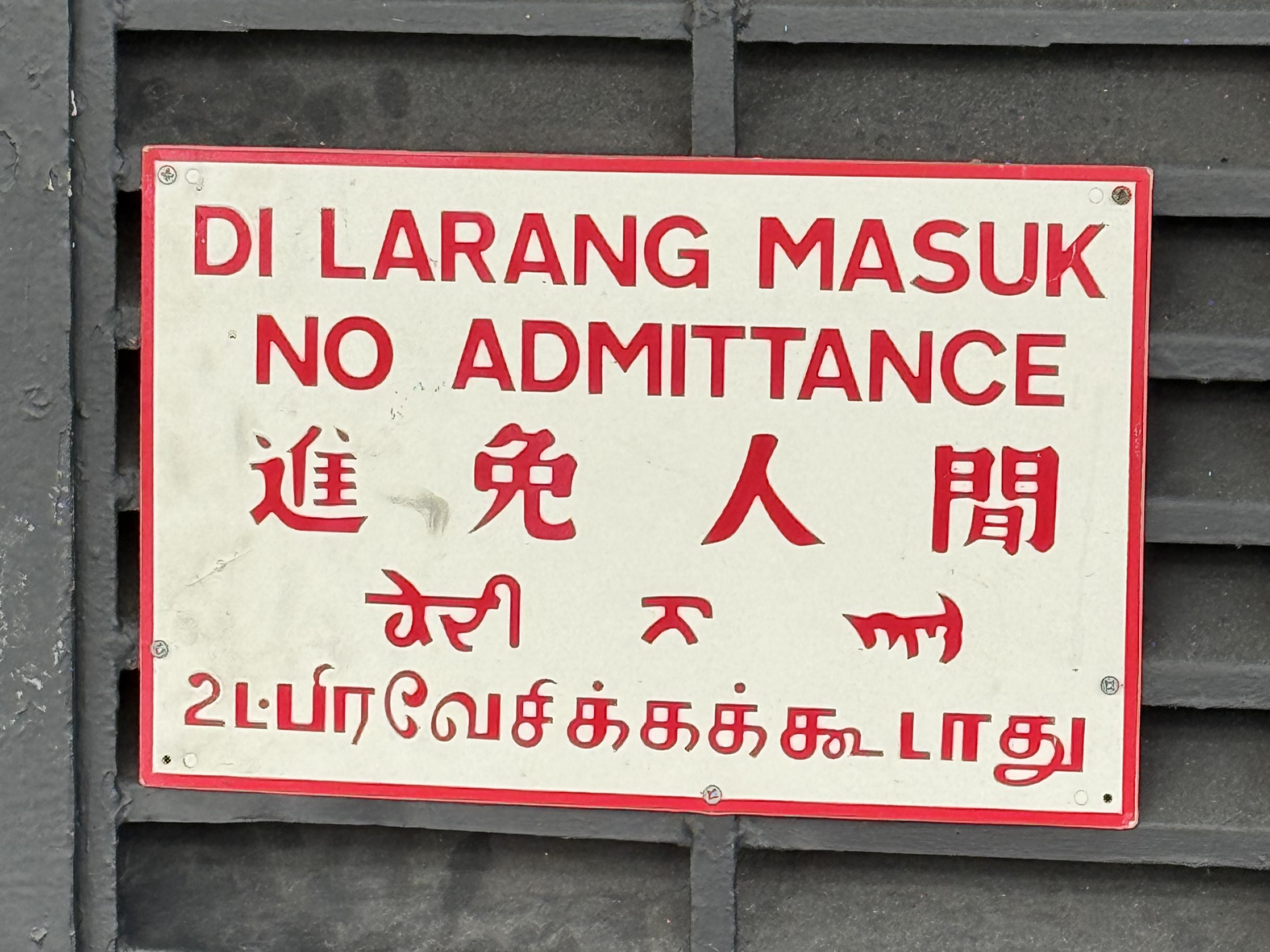
A "No Admittance" sign in five languages in Kota Kinabalu, Sabah, Malaysia. Top to bottom: Malay, English, Chinese, Punjabi and Tamil

=== Native languages in Peninsular Malaysia ===
Language	ISO 639-3 code	Speakers		Region	Family
Language	ISO 639-3 code	Number	% of total population	Region	Family
Baba Malay	mbf	12,000	0.0374	Malacca	Malay creole
Batek	btq	1,000	0.0031	Pahang, Kelantan, Terengganu	Aslian (Austroasiatic)
Chitty Malay	ccm	300	0.0009	Malacca	Malay creole
Cheq Wong	cwg	460	0.0014	Pahang	Aslian (Austroasiatic)
Duano'	dup	4,000	0.0125	Johor	Malayic (Austronesian)
Jah Hut	jah	4,191	0.0131	Pahang	Aslian (Austroasiatic)
Jahai	jhi	1,000	0.0031	Kelantan, Perak, Pahang	Aslian (Austroasiatic)
Jakun	jak	28,000	0.0874	Pahang, Johor	Malayic (Austronesian)
Jedek	–	280	0.0009	Kelantan	Aslian (Austroasiatic)
Kedahan Malay	meo	2,600,000	8.1124	Kedah, Penang, Perlis, Perak	Malayic (Austronesian)
Kelantanese Malay	mfa	1,500,000	4.6802	Kelantan, Terengganu	Malayic (Austronesian)
Kenaboi	xbn	extinct	0.0000	Negeri Sembilan	Unclassified
Kensiu	kns	259	0.0008	Kedah	Aslian (Austroasiatic)
Kintaq	knq	110	0.0003		Aslian (Austroasiatic)
Kristang	mcm	2,200	0.0069	Malacca	Portuguese creole
Lanoh	lnh	240	0.0007	Perak	Aslian (Austroasiatic)
Mah Meri	mhe	3,000	0.0094	Selangor	Aslian (Austroasiatic)
Minriq	mnq	270	0.0008	Kelantan	Aslian (Austroasiatic)
Mintil	mzt	180	0.0006	Pahang	Aslian (Austroasiatic)
Negeri Sembilan Malay	zmi	500,000	1.5601	Negeri Sembilan, Malacca	Malayic (Austronesian)
Orang Kanaq	orn	80	0.0002	Johor	Malayic (Austronesian)
Orang Seletar	ors	1,500	0.0047	Johor	Malayic (Austronesian)
Pahang Malay	–	–	0.0000	Pahang	Malayic (Austronesian)
Perak Malay	–	1,400,000	4.3682	Perak	Malayic (Austronesian)
Rawa Malay	–	–	0.0000	Perak	Malayic (Austronesian)
Reman Malay	–	–	0.0000	Perak	Malayic (Austronesian)
Sabüm	sbo	extinct	0.0000	Perak	Aslian (Austroasiatic)
Semai	sea	44,000	0.1373	Pahang, Perak	Aslian (Austroasiatic)
Semaq Beri	szc	2,000	0.0062	Pahang, Terengganu	Aslian (Austroasiatic)
Semelai	sza	4,100	0.0128	Pahang, Johor	Aslian (Austroasiatic)
Semnam	ssm	670	0.0021	Perak	Aslian (Austroasiatic)
Southern Thai	sou	70,000	0.2184	Kedah, Kelantan	Tai (Tai-Kadai)
Temiar	tea	15,000	0.0468	Pahang	Aslian (Austroasiatic)
Ten'edn/Mos	tnz	370	0.0012		Aslian (Austroasiatic)
Temoq	tmo	–	0.0000	Pahang	Aslian (Austroasiatic)
Temuan	tmw	23,300	0.0727	Selangor, Pahang, Negeri Sembilan, Malacca	Malayic (Austronesian)
Terengganu Malay	–	1,100,000	3.4322	Terengganu, Pahang, Johor	Malayic (Austronesian)
Tioman Malay	–	3,000	0.0000	Pahang, Johor	Malayic (Austronesian)
Wila'	–	extinct	0.0000	Penang	Aslian (Austroasiatic)

=== Native languages in Malaysian Borneo ===
Language	ISO 639-3 code	Speakers		Region	Family
Language	ISO 639-3 code	Number	% of total population	Region	Family
Abai	–	–	0.0000	Sarawak	North Bornean (Austronesian)
Bahau	bhv	19,000	0.0593	Sarawak	Kayan-Murik (Austronesian)
Bajaw	bdr	436,672	1.3625	Sabah, Labuan, Sarawak	Sama-Bajaw (Austronesian)
Belait	beg	–	0.0000	Sarawak	North Bornean (Austronesian)
Berawan	zbc, zbe, zbw	3,600	0.0112	Sarawak	North Bornean (Austronesian)
Biatah	bth	72,000	0.2247	Sarawak	Land Dayak (Austronesian)
Bintulu	bny	4,200	0.0131	Sarawak	North Bornean (Austronesian)
Bonggi	bdg	1,400	0.0044	Sabah	North Bornean (Austronesian)
Bookan	bnb	1,700	0.0053	Sabah	North Bornean (Austronesian)
Brunei Malay	kxd	–	0.0000	Sabah, Sarawak, Labuan	Malayic (Austronesian)
Brunei Bisaya	bsb	60,000	0.1872	Sarawak	North Bornean (Austronesian)
Bukar Sadong	sdo	49,000	0.1529	Sarawak	Land Dayak (Austronesian)
Bukitan	bkn	860	0.0027	Sarawak	North Bornean (Austronesian)
Coastal Kadazan	kzj	60,000	0.1872	Sabah	North Bornean (Austronesian)
Cocos Malay	coa	5,000	0.0156	Sabah	Malay creole
Central Dusun	dtp	140,000	0.4368	Sabah	North Bornean (Austronesian)
Daro-Matu	dro	7,600	0.0237	Sarawak	North Bornean (Austronesian)
Dumpas	dmv	1,100	0.0034	Sabah	North Bornean (Austronesian)
Dusun	kzt, tdu, ktr	36,000	0.1123	Sabah	North Bornean (Austronesian)
Eastern Kadazan	dtb	20,600	0.0643	Sabah	North Bornean (Austronesian)
Gana'	gnq	1,000	0.0031	Sabah	North Bornean (Austronesian)
Iban	iba	790,000	2.4649	Sarawak	Malayic (Austronesian)
Ida'an	dbj	10,000	0.0312	Sabah	North Bornean (Austronesian)
Iranun	ilm	22,000	0.0000	Sabah	Philippine (Austronesian)
Jagoi	sne	29,000	0.0905	Sarawak	Land Dayak (Austronesian)
Jangkang	djo	37,000	0.1154	Sarawak	Land Dayak (Austronesian)
Kajaman	kag	500	0.0016	Sarawak	North Bornean (Austronesian)
Kalabakan	kve	2,200	0.0069	Sarawak	North Bornean (Austronesian)
Kanowit	kxn	200	0.0006	Sarawak	North Bornean (Austronesian)
Kayan (Baram)	kys	13,400	0.0418	Sarawak	Kayan-Murik (Austronesian)
Kelabit	kzi	5,963	0.0186	Sarawak	North Bornean (Austronesian)
Kendayan	knx	–	0.0000	Sarawak	Malayic (Austronesian)
Keningau Murut	kxi	7,000	0.0218	Sabah	North Bornean (Austronesian)
Kinabatangan	dmg, ruu, low	10,000	0.0312	Sabah	North Bornean (Austronesian)
Kimaragang	kqr	–	0.0000	Sabah	North Bornean (Austronesian)
Kiput	kyi	2,500	0.0078	Sarawak	North Bornean (Austronesian)
Klias River Kadazan	kqt	1,000	0.0031	Sabah	North Bornean (Austronesian)
Kota Marudu Talantang	grm	1,800	0.0056	Sabah	North Bornean (Austronesian)
Kuijau	dkr	7,910	0.0247	Sabah	North Bornean (Austronesian)
Lahanan	lhn	350	0.0011	Sarawak	Melanau-Kajang (Austronesian)
Lelak	llk	extinct	0.0000	Sarawak	North Bornean (Austronesian)
Lengilu	lgi	3	0.0000	Sarawak	North Bornean (Austronesian)
Lotud	dtr	20,000	0.0624	Sabah	North Bornean (Austronesian)
Lun Bawang	lnd	16,000	0.0499	Sarawak	North Bornean (Austronesian)
Lundayeh	xkl	9,125	0.0285	Sabah	North Bornean (Austronesian)
Mainstream Kenyah	xkl	50,000	0.1560	Sarawak	North Bornean (Austronesian)
Melanau	mel, sdx	110,000	0.3432	Sarawak	Melanau-Kajang (Austronesian)
Minokok	mqq	2,000	0.0062	Sabah	North Bornean (Austronesian)
Molbog	pwm	6,700	0.0209	Sabah	Philippine (Austronesian)
Murik Kayan	mxr	1,120	0.0035	Sarawak	Kayan-Murik (Austronesian)
Narom	nrm	2,420	0.0076	Sarawak	North Bornean (Austronesian)
Nonukan Tidong	tid	20,000	0.0624	Sabah	North Bornean (Austronesian)
Okolod	kqv	5,000	0.0156	Sabah	North Bornean (Austronesian)
Paluan	plz	5,500	0.0172	Sabah	North Bornean (Austronesian)
Papar	dpp	500	0.0016	Sabah	North Bornean (Austronesian)
Penan	pez, pne	13,000	0.0406	Sarawak	North Bornean (Austronesian)
Punan Batu	pnm	30	0.0001	Sarawak	Melanau-Kajang (Austronesian)
Remun	lkj	3,500	0.0109	Sarawak	Malayic (Austronesian)
Rungus	drg	60,000	0.1872	Sabah	North Bornean (Austronesian)
Sa'ban	snv	2,000	0.0062	Sarawak	North Bornean (Austronesian)
Sabah Bisaya	bsy	21,000	0.0655	Sabah	North Bornean (Austronesian)
Sabah Malay	msi	–	0.0000	Sabah	Malay creole
Sama	ssb, sml, sse	80,000	0.0000	Sabah	Sama-Bajaw (Austronesian)
Sarawak Malay	—N/a	600,000	1.8721	Sarawak	Malayic (Austronesian)
Sebop	sib	1,730	0.0054	Sarawak	North Bornean (Austronesian)
Sekapan	skp	750	0.0023	Sarawak	Melanau-Kajang (Austronesian)
Selungai Murut	slg	1,200	0.0037	Sabah	North Bornean (Austronesian)
Sembakung	sbr	2,000	0.0062	Sabah	North Bornean (Austronesian)
Seru	szd	extinct	0.0000	Sarawak	North Bornean (Austronesian)
Serudung	srk	350	0.0011	Sabah	North Bornean (Austronesian)
Sian	spg	50	0.0002	Sarawak	North Bornean (Austronesian)
Sungai	abf	500	0.0016	Sabah	North Bornean (Austronesian)
Sugut Dusun	kzs	240,000	0.7488	Sabah	North Bornean (Austronesian)
Suluk	tsg	209,000	0.6521	Sabah	Philippine (Austronesian)
Tatana'	txx	21,000	0.0655	Sabah	North Bornean (Austronesian)
Tagol	mvv	50,000	0.1560	Sabah	North Bornean (Austronesian)
Timugon	tih	9,000	0.0281	Sabah	North Bornean (Austronesian)
Tombonuwo	txa	13,000	0.0406	Sabah	North Bornean (Austronesian)
Tring	tgq	550	0.0017	Sabah	North Bornean (Austronesian)
Tringgus	trx	850	0.0027	Sabah	North Bornean (Austronesian)
Tutoh	ttw	600	0.0019	Sarawak	North Bornean (Austronesian)
Ukit	umi	120	0.0004	Sarawak	North Bornean (Austronesian)
Uma' Lasan	xky	6,000	0.0187	Sarawak	North Bornean (Austronesian)

=== Other languages recognised as Native ===
Estimated number of speakers in Malaysia as of 2019:

Language	Code	Speakers	Family
Acehnese	ace	84,000	Chamic (Austronesian)
Banjarese	bjn	26,000	Malayic (Austronesian)
Buginese	bug	143,000	South Sulawesi (Austronesian)
Cham	cja	13,000	Chamic (Austronesian)
Javanese	jav	661,000	Javanese (Austronesian)
Kerinci	kvr		Malayic (Austronesian)
Mandailing	btm	31,000	Northwest Sumatra–Barrier Islands (Austronesian)
Minangkabau	min	931,000	Malayic (Austronesian)

=== Malaysian Chinese languages ===
The estimated numbers of speakers of Chinese languages in Malaysia as of 2019 are as follows:

Language	ISO 639-3 code	Speakers	Family
Cantonese	yue	1,443,000	Sino-Tibetan
Foochow		260,000	Sino-Tibetan
Hakka	hak	1,787,000	Sino-Tibetan
Hainanese	nan	405,000	Sino-Tibetan
Hokkien	nan	1,966,000	Sino-Tibetan
Mandarin	cmn	1,019,000	Sino-Tibetan
Min Bei	mnp	397,000	Sino-Tibetan
Teochew	nan	1,038,000	Sino-Tibetan

=== Malaysian Indian languages ===
Estimated number of speakers in Malaysia as of 2023:

Language	Code	Speakers	Family
Gujarati	guj	31,000	Indo-European
Hindi	hin	63,000	Indo-European
Bengali	Ben	87,000	Indo-European
Malayalam	mal	367,000	Dravidian
Punjabi	pan	72,000	Indo-European
Tamil	tam	1,993,000	Dravidian
Telugu	tel	126,000	Dravidian
Urdu	urd	16,000	Indo-European

=== Foreign languages ===
- Arabic
- Burmese
- Filipino
- French
- German
- Indonesian
- Italian
- Japanese
- Khmer
- Korean
- Persian
- Portuguese
- Spanish
- Swahili
- Vietnamese
- Tetum
- Thai (Central Thai)
- Turkish

== See also ==
- Demographics of Malaysia
