= Mainland Southeast Asia =

Continental portion of Southeast Asia

Mainland Southeast Asia Indochina
- Area: 2,071,552 km^{2} (799,831 sq mi)
- Population: ▲276,966,662 (2025)
- Population density: 133.7/km^{2} (346/sq mi) (2025)
- GDP (PPP): ▲$7.29 trillion
- GDP (nominal): ▲$2.51 trillion
- GDP per capita: ▲$8,449
- Demonym: Mainland Southeast Asian
- Countries: Cambodia; Laos; Malaysia (peninsular portion only); Myanmar; Singapore; Thailand; Vietnam
- Languages: Burmese, Khmer, Lao, Malaysian, Thai, Vietnamese
- Time zones: UTC+6:30, UTC+7:00, UTC+8:00
- Internet TLD: .kh, .la, .mm, .my, .sg, .th, and .vn
- Largest cities: Largest population centres: 1. (Thailand) Bangkok; 2. (Vietnam) Ho Chi Minh City; 3. (Malaysia) Kuala Lumpur; 4. Singapore; 5. (Myanmar) Yangon; 6. (Vietnam) Hanoi

Mainland Southeast Asia (historically known as Indochina and the Indochinese Peninsula; abbreviated MSEA) is the continental portion of Southeast Asia. It comprises the countries of Cambodia, Laos, Myanmar, Peninsular Malaysia, Singapore, Thailand, and Vietnam. MSEA borders East Asia to the north, South Asia to the west, and Maritime Southeast Asia to the south and east.

The term Indochina (originally Indo-China) was coined in the early nineteenth century, emphasizing the historical cultural influence of Indian and Chinese civilizations on the region. The term was later adopted as the name of the colony of French Indochina (present-day Cambodia, Laos, Vietnam and parts of China). Today, the term Mainland Southeast Asia is more commonly used, in contrast to Maritime Southeast Asia for the island groups off the coast of the continental region.

== Terminology ==
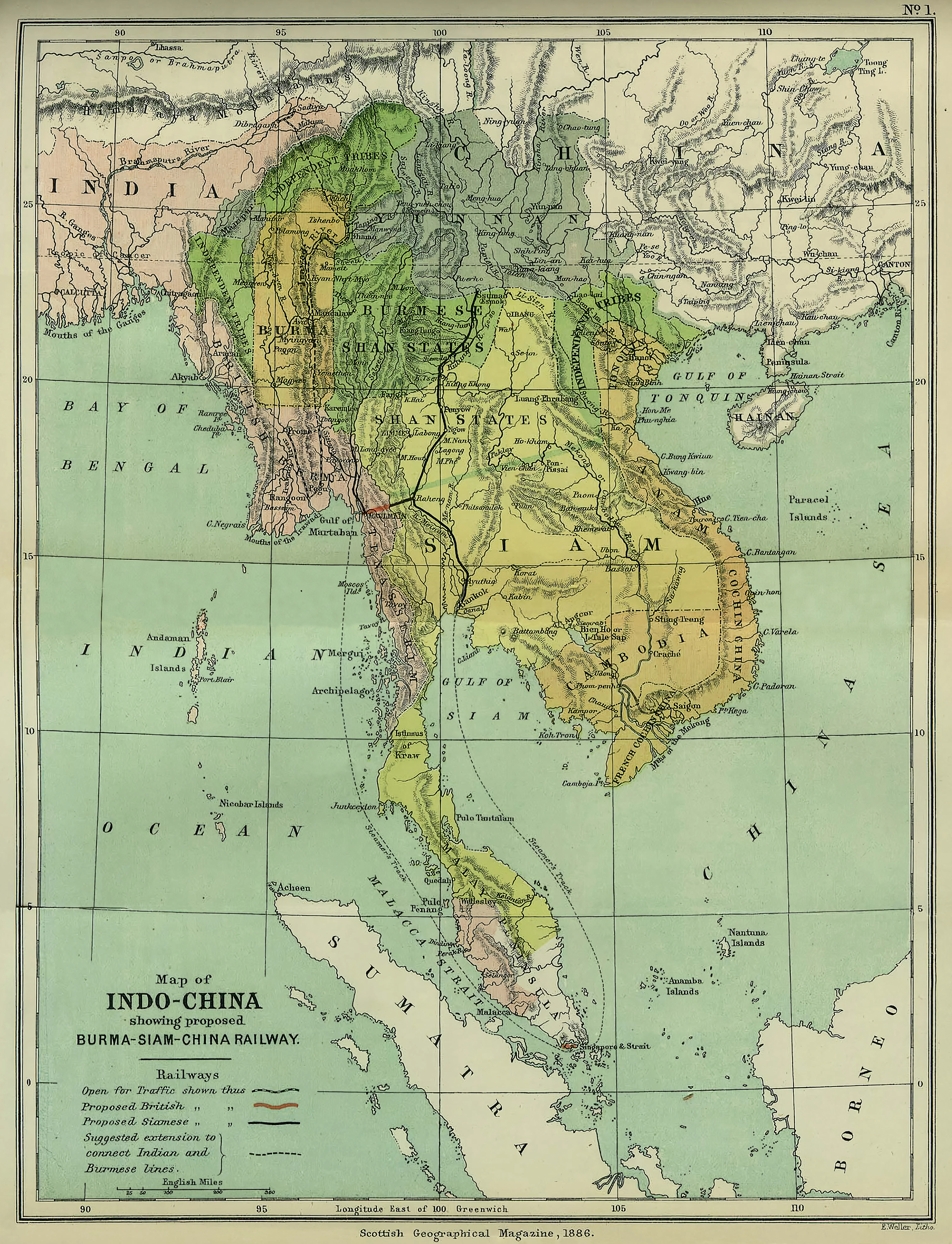
1886 map of Indochina, from the Scottish Geographical Magazine

In Indian sources, the earliest name connected with Southeast Asia is Yāvadvīpa. Another possible early name of mainland Southeast Asia was Suvarṇabhūmi ('land of gold'), a toponym, that appears in many ancient Indian literary sources and Buddhist texts, but which, along with Suvarṇadvīpa ('island' or 'peninsula of gold'), are also thought to refer to insular Southeast Asia.

The origins of the name Indo-China are usually attributed jointly to the Danish-French geographer Conrad Malte-Brun, who referred to the area as indo-chinois in 1804, and the Scottish linguist John Leyden, who used the term Indo-Chinese to describe the area's inhabitants and their languages in 1808. The unfamiliar outsiders from Europe thought the region had a dual Indian and Chinese cultural makeup. Much of the mainland practiced Theravada Buddhism while the east coast had a Confucian Kingdom (Đại Việt) with a language based on Chinese characters. However, in reality the mainland was inhabited by about 12 different kingdoms and other territories with an ethnically diverse population descended from 23 different societies dating back to at least the 14th century. The French failed to properly recognize this ethnic diversity and simply referred to the region as Indochina.

Scholarly opinions at the time regarding China's and India's historical influence over the area were conflicting, and the term was itself controversial—Malte-Brun himself later argued against its use in a later edition of his La Nouvelle Géographie universelle, reasoning that it overemphasized Chinese influence, and suggested Chin-India instead. Nevertheless, Indo-China had already gained traction and soon supplanted alternative terms such as Further India and the Peninsula beyond the Ganges. Later, however, as the French established the colony of French Indochina (covering present-day Cambodia, Laos, and Vietnam), use of the term became more restricted to the French colony. After the Vietnam War, the term Indochina gradually fell out of use in favor of the more politically correct (Mainland) Southeast Asia. Today the area is usually referred to as Mainland Southeast Asia. The regional abbreviation MSEA is used especially in academia.

== Biogeography ==
In biogeography, the Indochinese bioregion is a major region in the Indomalayan realm, and also a phytogeographical floristic region in the Oriental Paleotropical Kingdom. It includes the native flora and fauna of all the countries above. The adjacent Malesian Region covers the Maritime Southeast Asian countries, and straddles the Indomalayan and Australasian realms.

== Geography ==
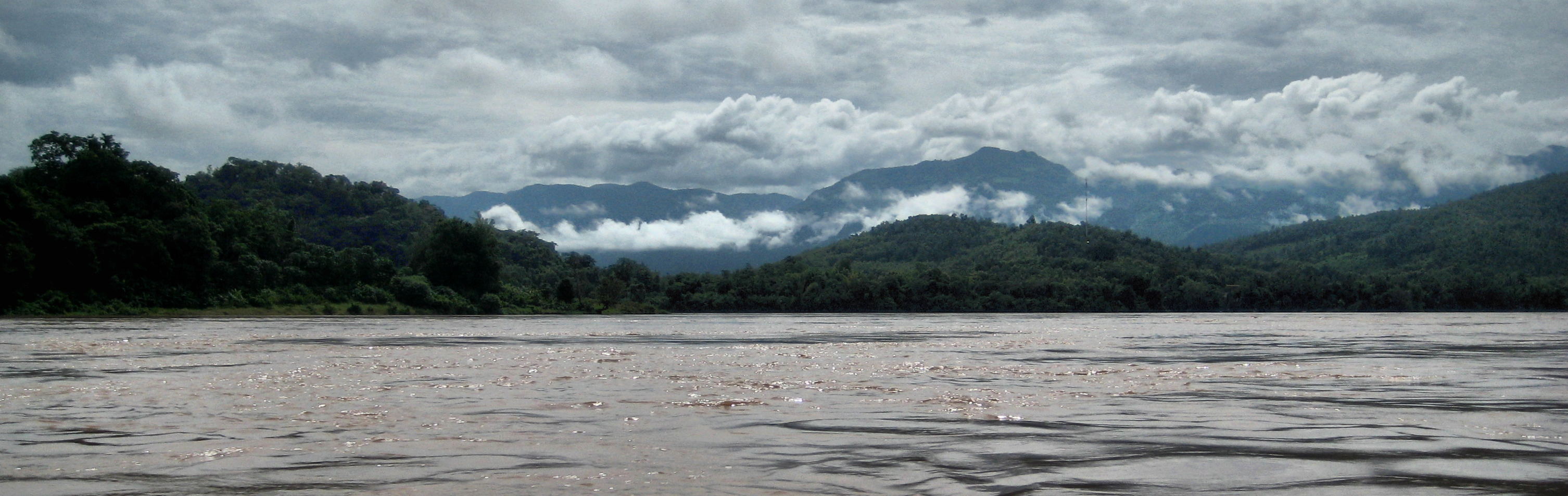
Mekong River

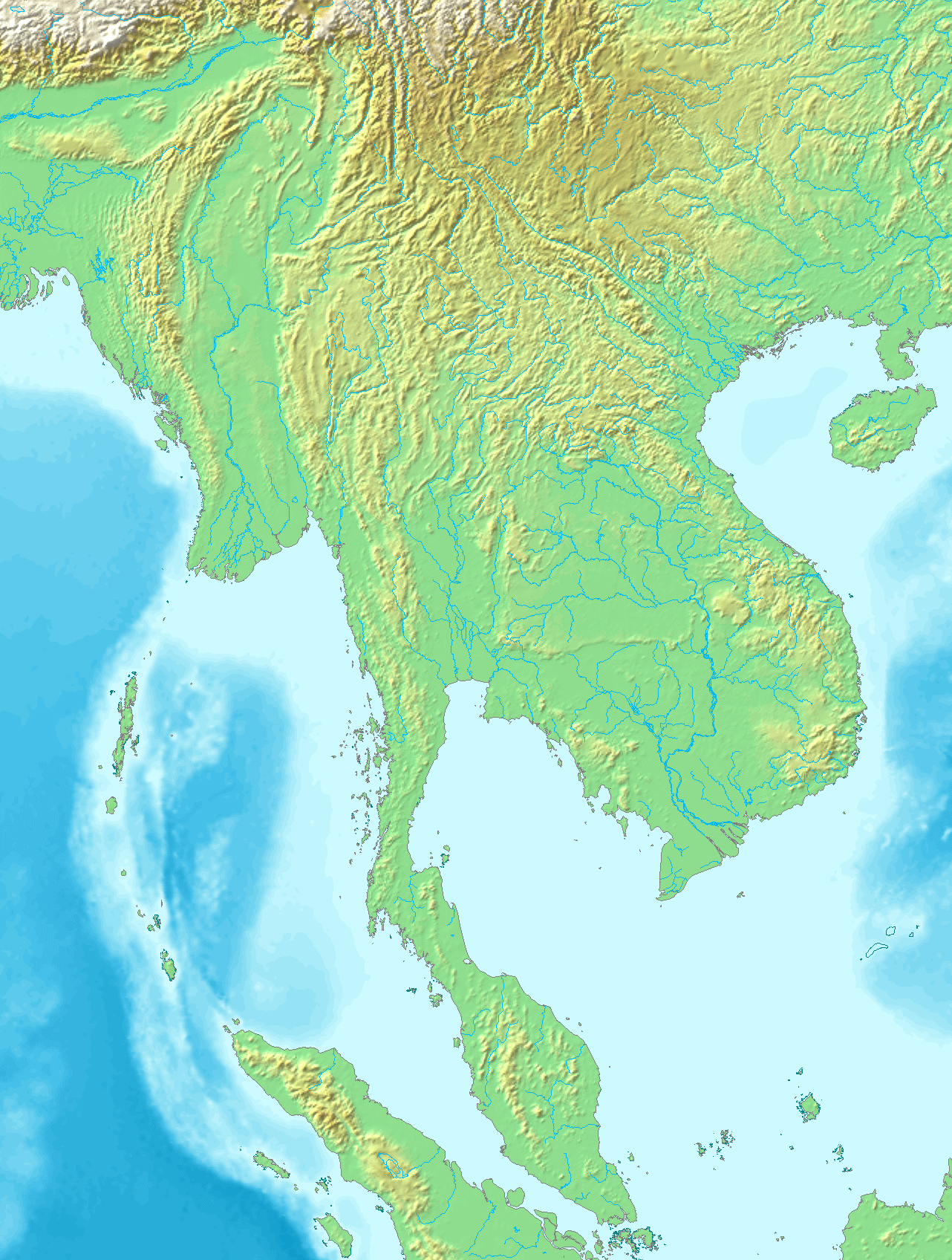
Topographic Map of Mainland Southeast Asia 2005

Mainland Southeast Asia is formally classified as a continental region which extends from the Asian landmass. It is fundamentally a "continental projection" of Asia, bordered by India to the west and China to the north. It is situated completely above the equator in the Northern Hemisphere. The continental region projects southward from the Asian continent proper. It contains several mountain ranges extending from the Tibetan Plateau in the north, interspersed with lowlands largely drained by three major river systems running in a north–south direction: the Irrawaddy (Myanmar), the Chao Phraya (in Thailand), and the Mekong (flowing through Northeastern Thailand, Laos, Cambodia and Vietnam). To the south it forms the Malay Peninsula, located on which are Southern Thailand and Peninsular Malaysia. Singapore is a small island country that is separated from Malaysia by the 1.6 km wide Straits of Johor. The Singapore Strait is a 113 km-long waterway and eastern extension of the Strait of Malacca, linking it to the South China Sea.

Mainland Southeast Asia is separated from the archipelagoes of Maritime Southeast Asia primarily by the South China Sea to the east and southeast, the Strait of Malacca to the south, and the Andaman Sea to the west. The maritime region comprises islands and archipelagos. The physical geography of Peninsular Malaysia connects via the Kra Isthmus to Thailand which makes it part of Mainland Southeast Asia. Malaysia is both mainland and insular. East Malaysia is in Borneo so it is variably considered part of Maritime Southeast Asia.

MSEA borders China to the north (East Asia), Bangladesh and India to the west (South Asia), and Indonesia as well as the Philippines to the south and east (Maritime Southeast Asia).

The Gulf of Thailand is the largest gulf in Southeast Asia with a surface area of 320,000 km^{2} (120,000 sq mi). It has a mean depth of 45 meters, and a maximum depth of 80 meters.

Tonlé Sap in Cambodia is the largest freshwater lake in Southeast Asia with a maximum surface area of 16,000 km^{2} (6,200 mi^{2}).

The Mekong is 4,900 km long and the longest river in Southeast Asia. It flows from its source in the Tibetan Plateau through multiple countries in MSEA including Myanmar, Laos, Thailand, Cambodia, and Vietnam. The river basin drains a total land area of 795,000 km2 and it has the world's 10th largest mean annual discharge of 475 km3.

The highest elevation is Hkakabo Razi mountain at 5,881-meter (19,295 ft) in Myanmar. The lowest point is Boh Yai mine which is at least −106-meter (−348 ft) in Kanchanaburi Province, Thailand.

=== Climate ===
Climate of Southeast Asia

The Köppen climate classification says the northern areas of Myanmar, Laos and Vietnam have a temperate climate. Central Myanmar, Thailand, Cambodia, Southern Laos have mainly a tropical savannah climate. The western coastline along the Bay of Bengal, Andaman Sea and Southern Thailand each have a tropical monsoon climate. Central and Southern Vietnam have both tropical savannah and monsoon climates. The tip of Southern Thailand, Peninsular Malaysia and Singapore have a tropical rainforest climate.

== List of states and territories ==
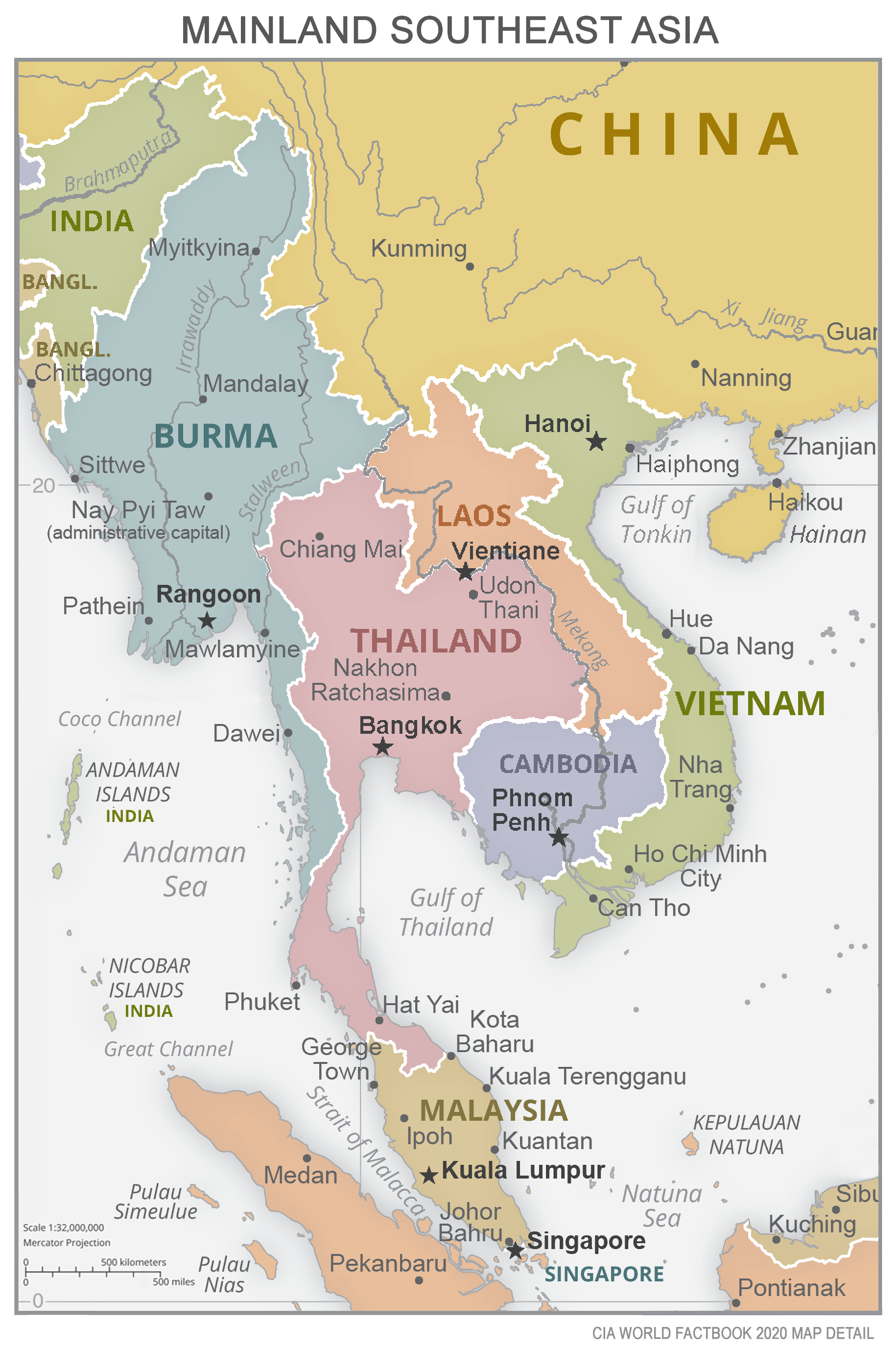
A political map of Mainland Southeast Asia

This list includes all internationally recognised sovereign countries falling even partially under any common geographical or political definitions of Mainland Southeast Asia. All countries listed are members of ASEAN.

Arms	Flag	Name	Area (km^{2})	Population (2025)	Population density (/km^{2})	HDI (2023)	Capital
Cambodia	(Cambodia)	Cambodia	181,035	18,051,219	92	0.606	Phnom Penh
Laos	(Laos)	Laos	236,800	7,647,000	31	0.617	Vientiane
Malaysia	(Malaysia)	Malaysia	132,090 (peninsular portion only)	27,111,506 (79.2% in peninsular portion)	102	0.819	Kuala Lumpur *
Myanmar	(Myanmar)	Myanmar	676,578	51,316,756	80	0.609	Nay Pyi Taw
Singapore	(Singapore)	Singapore	719.2	6,110,200	8,261	0.946	Singapore
Thailand	(Thailand)	Thailand	513,120	65,859,640	140	0.798	Bangkok
Vietnam	(Vietnam)	Vietnam	331,210	102,177,431	294	0.766	Hanoi
Total			2,071,552.2	276,966,662	133.7	0.741	

* Administrative centre in Putrajaya.

== Economy ==
Country	Currency	Population (2020)	Nominal GDP(2026)	GDP per capita(2026)	GDP growth(2026)	Inflation(2026)	Main industries
Cambodia	៛ Riel US$ US Dollar	16,718,965	$52.379	$3,001	3.00%	5.6%	Clothing, gold, agriculture
Laos	₭ Kip	7,275,560	$18.959	$2,331	4.53%	9.2%	Copper, electronics, tin
Malaysia	RM Ringgit	32,365,999	$547.100	$15,981	5.20%	2.2%	Electronics, petroleum, petrochemicals, palm oil, automotive
Myanmar	K Kyat	54,409,800	$83.832	$1,507	2.05%	20%	Natural gas, agriculture, clothing
Singapore	S$ Singapore dollar	5,850,342	$667.889	$109,117	4.96%	2.3%	Electronics, petroleum, chemicals
Thailand	฿ Baht	69,799,978	$599.115	$8,372	2.10%	2.1%	Electronics, automotive, rubber
Vietnam	₫ Đồng	97,338,579	$542.130	$5,260	8.40%	4.7%	Electronics, clothing, petroleum

== Culture ==
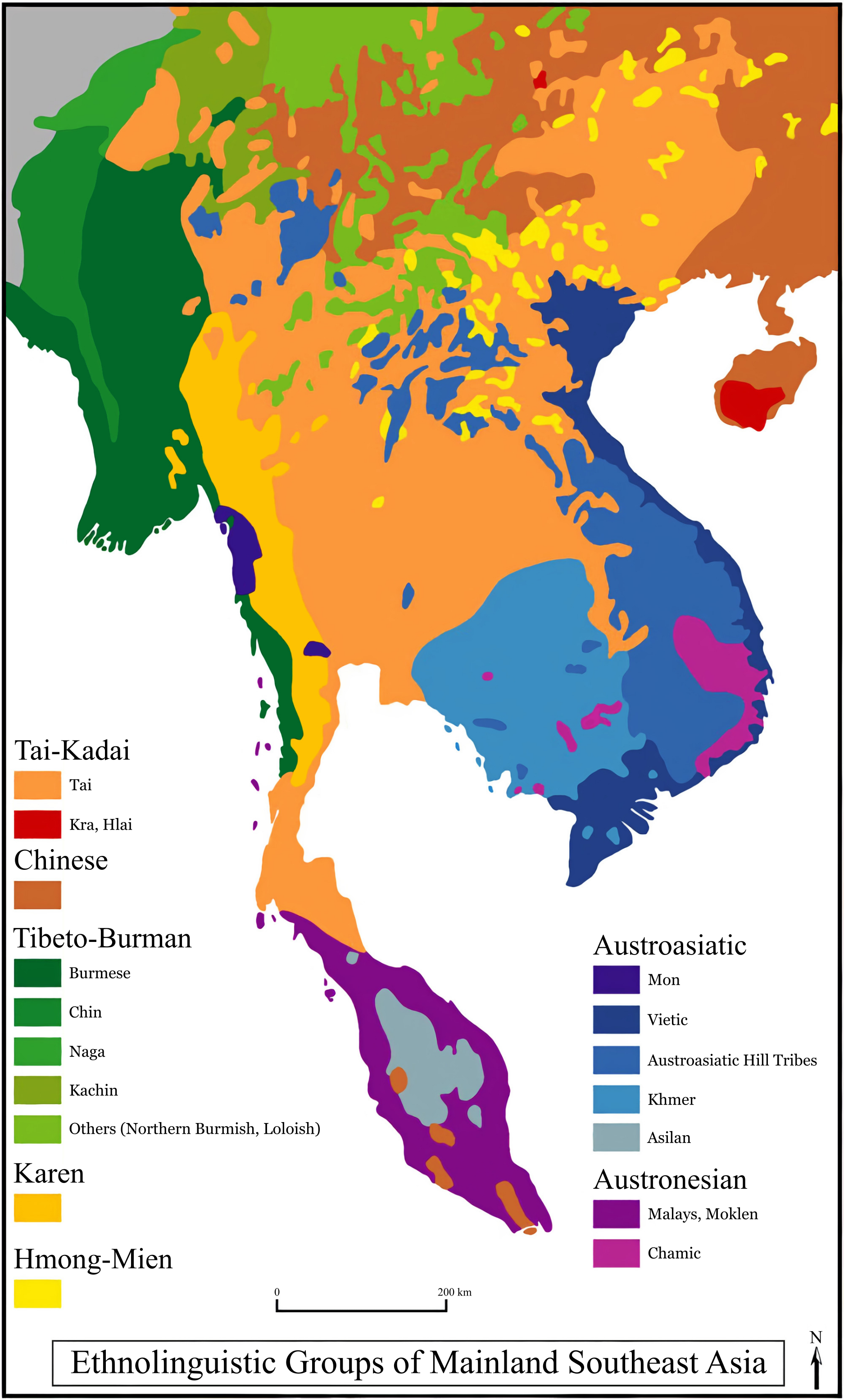
Ethnolinguistic groups of mainland Southeast Asia

Mainland Southeast Asia contrasts with Maritime Southeast Asia, mainly through the division of largely land-based lifestyles in Indochina and the sea-based lifestyles of the Indonesian archipelago and Philippine archipelago, as well as the dividing line between the Austroasiatic, Tai–Kadai, and Sino-Tibetan languages (spoken in Mainland Southeast Asia) versus the Austronesian languages (spoken in Maritime Southeast Asia). The languages of the mainland form the Mainland Southeast Asia linguistic area: although belonging to several independent language families, they have converged over the course of history and share a number of typological similarities.

The countries of Mainland Southeast Asia received cultural influence from both India and China to varying degrees. Myanmar, Thailand, Laos, and Cambodia were all significantly influenced by the ancient cultures of India and Sri Lanka. Vietnam is generally considered part of the Sinosphere, although it has also been influenced to a lesser extent by India. The former kingdom of Champa in Central and Southern Vietnam was very influenced by Indian culture.

Overall, Mainland Southeast Asia is religiously diverse, with Buddhism forming a majority religion in parts of the region, alongside significant Muslim, Christian, and folk religious traditions.

The direction of road traffic is on the right side in Cambodia, Laos, Myanmar and Vietnam. It is on the left side in Malaysia, Singapore and Thailand.

== Demographics ==
Mainland Southeast Asia is an ethnically diverse region with over 276 million people (2025). The metropolitan areas are densely populated. The capital cities are also economic hubs. However, the countryside of Myanmar and Thailand are sparsely populated. Cambodia and Laos have low density populations. The coastline of Vietnam is densely populated.

The biggest ethnic groups include the Thai, Lao, Viet, Burmese, Khmer and Malays. There are hundreds of other minor ethnic groups including Chinese, Indian, and various indigenous hill tribe populations. The Thai and Lao speak Kra–Dai languages which originate from South China. The Khmer and Viet speak Austroasiatic languages, but the Malays are Austronesian. The Burmese language is Tibeto-Burman.

As of April 2026, MSEA's population of around 277 million people represents 5.7% of the population in continental Asia and 3.4% of the total world population.

=== Religion ===
Religion in Mainland Southeast Asia (2020) (Note: Includes the countries: Cambodia, Laos, Malaysia, Myanmar, Singapore, Thailand, and Vietnam.)
1. Buddhism (56.8%)
2. Islam (13.5%)
3. Folk religion (12.7%)
4. Unaffiliated (6.98%)
5. Christianity (6.58%)
6. Hinduism (2.05%)
7. Other (1.44%)

Country	Religions
Cambodia	Buddhism (97%), Islam, Christianity, Animism, others
Laos	Buddhism (67%), Animism, Christianity, others
Malaysia	Islam (61.3%), Buddhism, Christianity, Hinduism, Animism
Myanmar (Burma)	Buddhism (89%), Islam, Christianity, Hinduism, Animism, others
Singapore	Buddhism (31.1%), Christianity (18.9%), Islam (15.6%), Taoism (8.8%), Hinduism (5%), others (20.6%)
Thailand	Buddhism (93.5%), Islam (5.4%), Christianity (1.13%), Hinduism (0.02%), others (0.003%)
Vietnam	Vietnamese folk religion (45.3%), Buddhism (16.4%), Christianity (8.2%), Other (0.4%), Unaffiliated (29.6%)

=== Languages ===
Country/Region	Languages
Cambodia	Khmer, English, French, Teochew, Vietnamese, Cham, Mandarin, others
Laos	Lao, French, Thai, Vietnamese, Khmu, Hmong, Phuthai, Bru, Tai Lü, Akha, Iu Mien and others
Malaysia	Malaysian, English, Mandarin, Tamil, Daro-Matu, Kedah Malay, Sabah Malay, Brunei Malay, Kelantan Malay, Pahang Malay, Acehnese, Javanese, Minangkabau, Banjar, Buginese, Tagalog, Hakka, Cantonese, Hokkien, Teochew, Fuzhounese, Telugu, Bengali, Punjabi, Sinhala, Malayalam, Arabic, Brunei Bisaya, Okolod, Kota Marudu Talantang, Kelabit, Lotud, Terengganu Malay, Semelai, Thai, Iban, Kadazan, Dusun, Kristang, Bajau, Jakun, Mah Meri, Batek, Melanau, Semai, Temuan, Lun Bawang, Temiar, Penan, Tausug, Iranun, Lundayeh/Lun Bawang, and others see: Languages of Malaysia
Myanmar (Burma)	Burmese, Shan, Kayin (Karen), Rakhine, Kachin, Chin, Mon, Kayah, Mandarin, Bengali, Tamil, Telugu and other ethnic languages.
Singapore	English, Malay, Mandarin Chinese, Tamil, Hokkien, Teochew, Cantonese, Hakka, Japanese, Telugu, Malayalam, Punjabi, Indonesian, Boyanese, Buginese, Javanese, Balinese, Singlish and others see: Languages of Singapore
Thailand	Thai, Isan, Northern Khmer, Malay, Karen, Hmong, Teochew, Minnan, Hakka, Yuehai, Burmese, Iu Mien, Tamil, Bengali, Urdu, Arabic, Shan, Tai Lü, Phuthai, Mon and others
Vietnam	Vietnamese, Cantonese, Tày, Thái, Mường, Khmer, Cham, Hmong, and others

== Major cities ==
Largest population centres of Mainland Southeast Asia
Rank	City name	Country	Pop.
1	Bangkok	Thailand	18,180,000
2	Ho Chi Minh City	Vietnam	14,053,000
3	Kuala Lumpur	Malaysia	8,444,000
4	Singapore	Singapore	6,110,200
5	Yangon	Myanmar	5,618,000
6	Hanoi	Vietnam	5,068,000

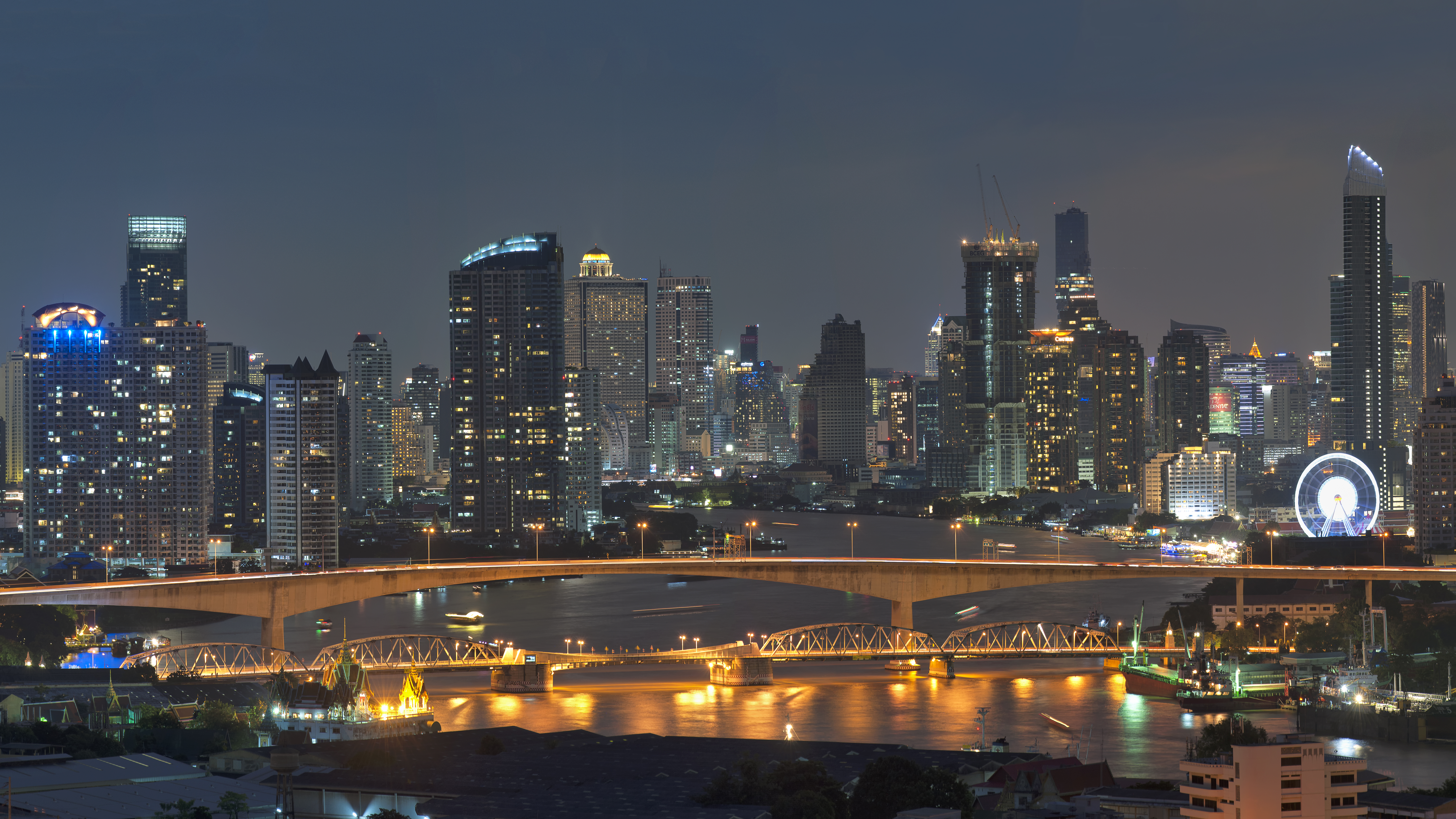
Bangkok is the capital of Thailand and has one of the world's largest metropolitan populations.

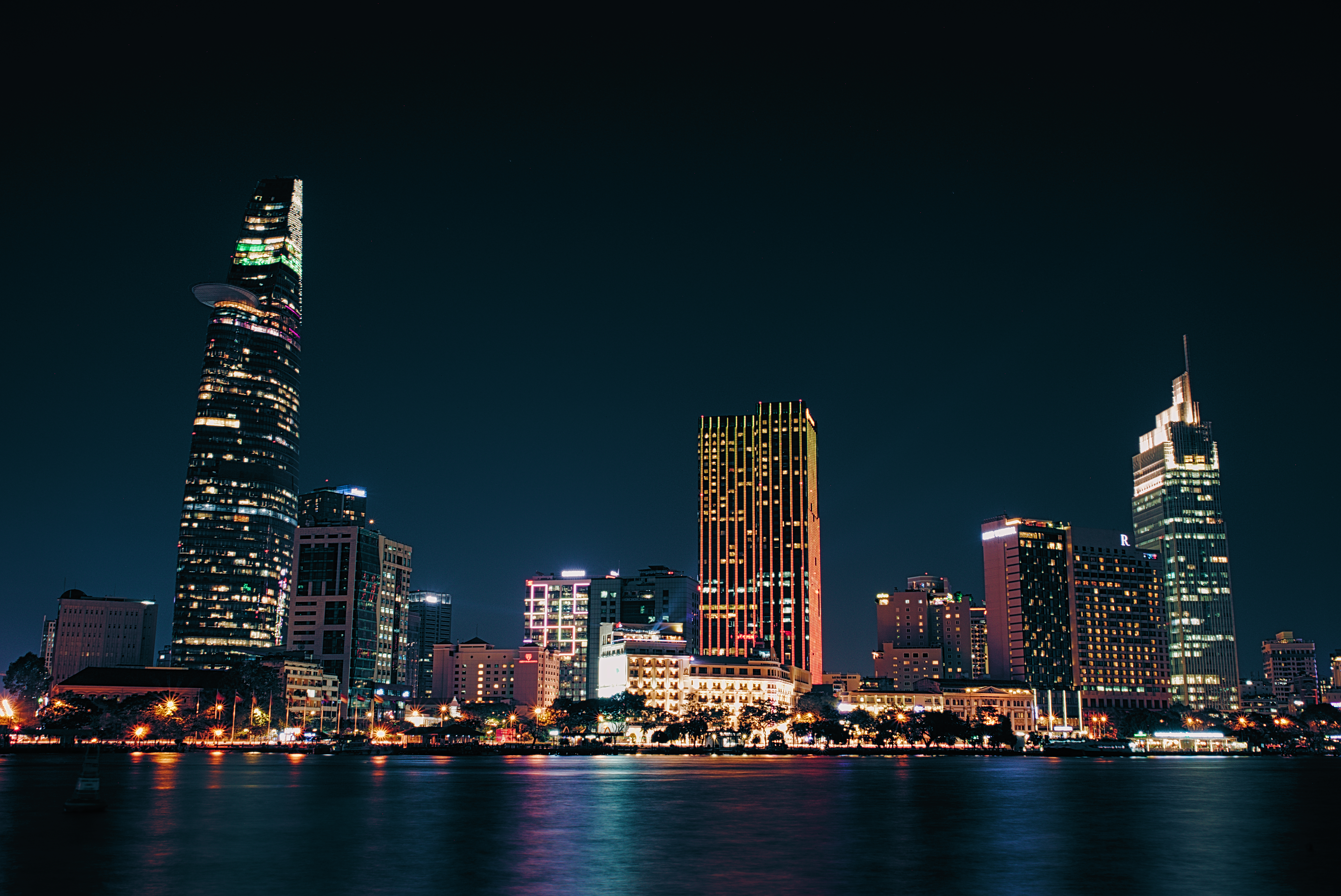
Ho Chi Minh City is the most populous municipality of Vietnam.

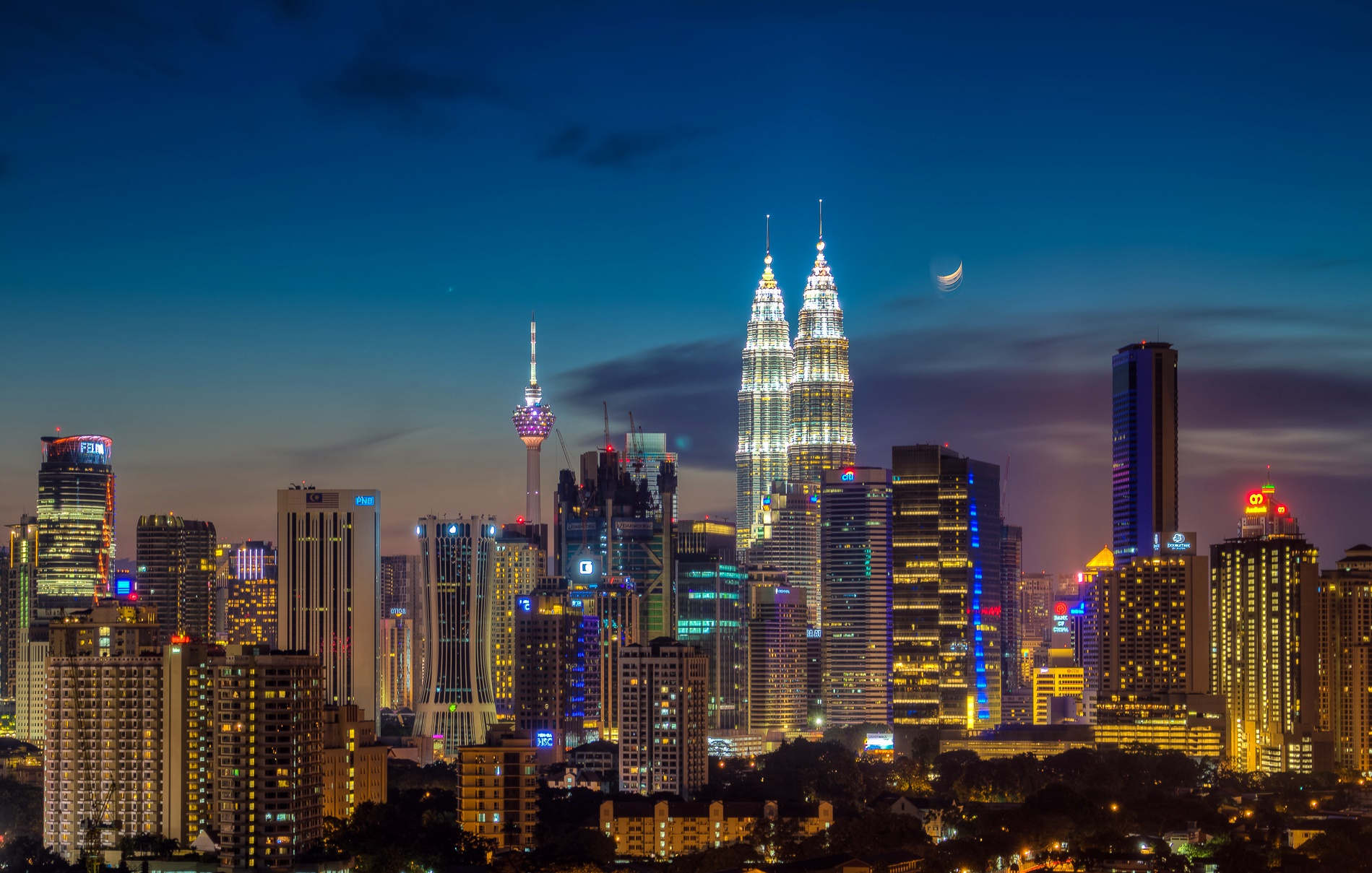
Kuala Lumpur is the capital of Malaysia.

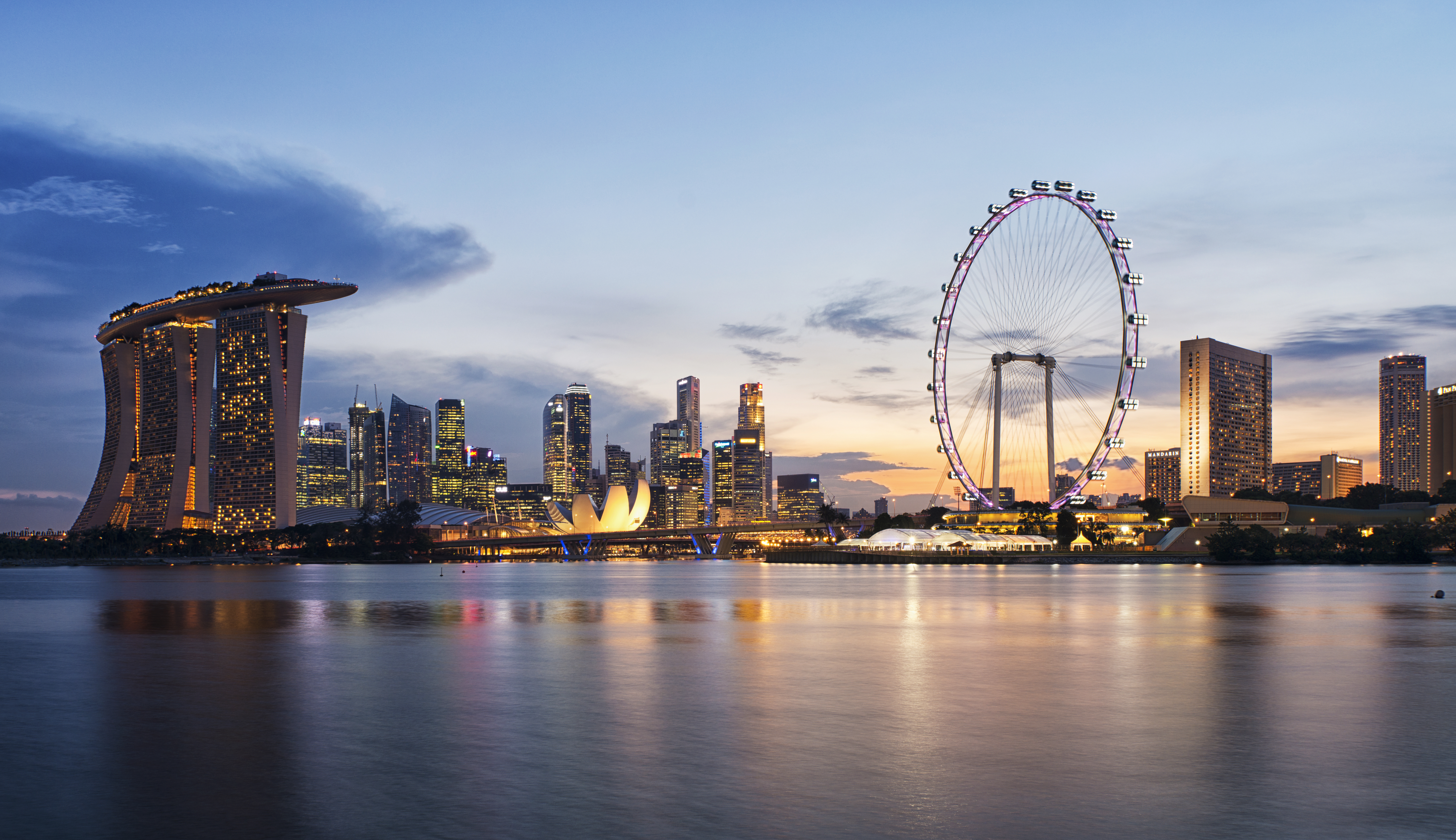
Singapore is a densely populated city-state.

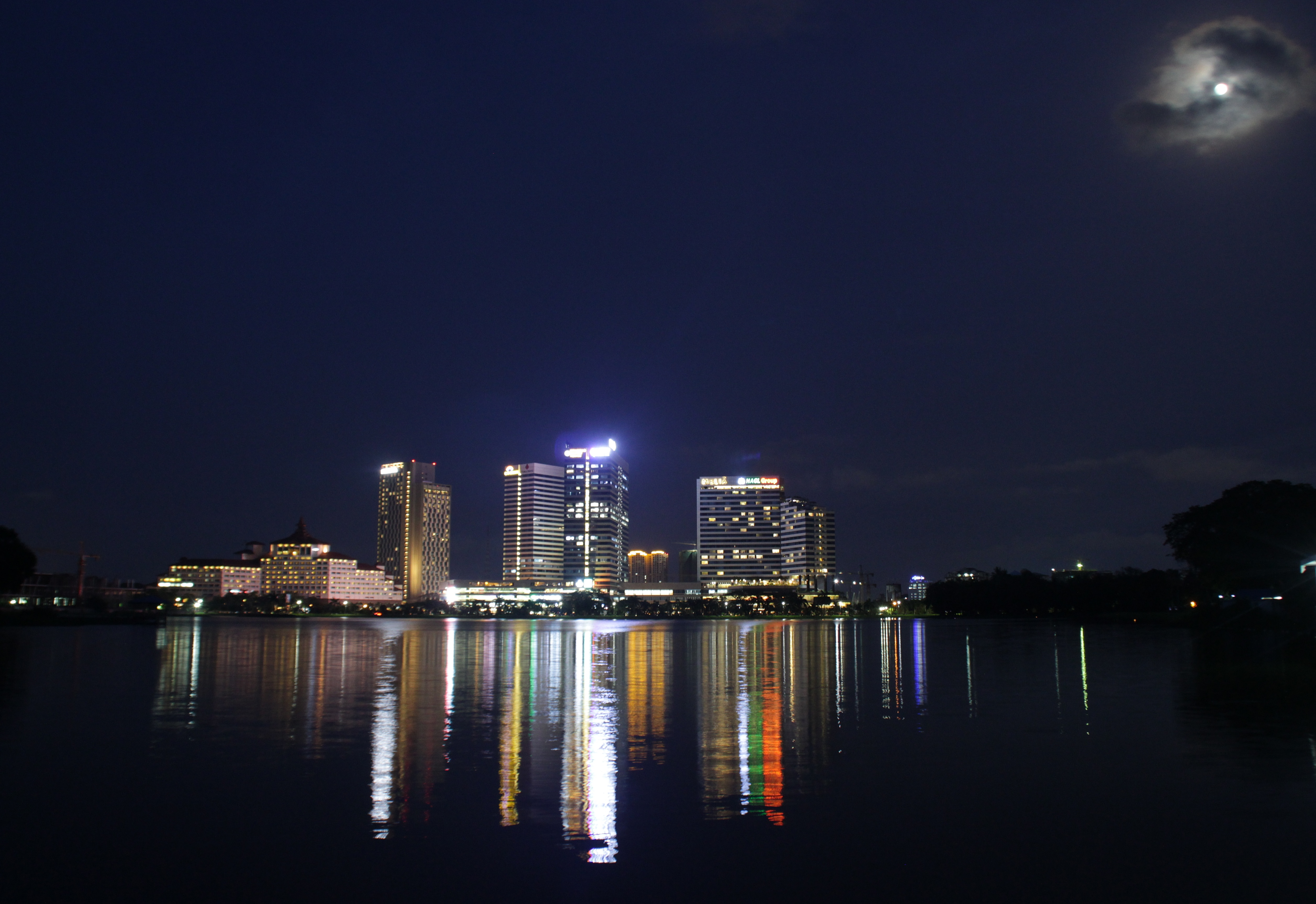
Yangon is the largest city in Myanmar.

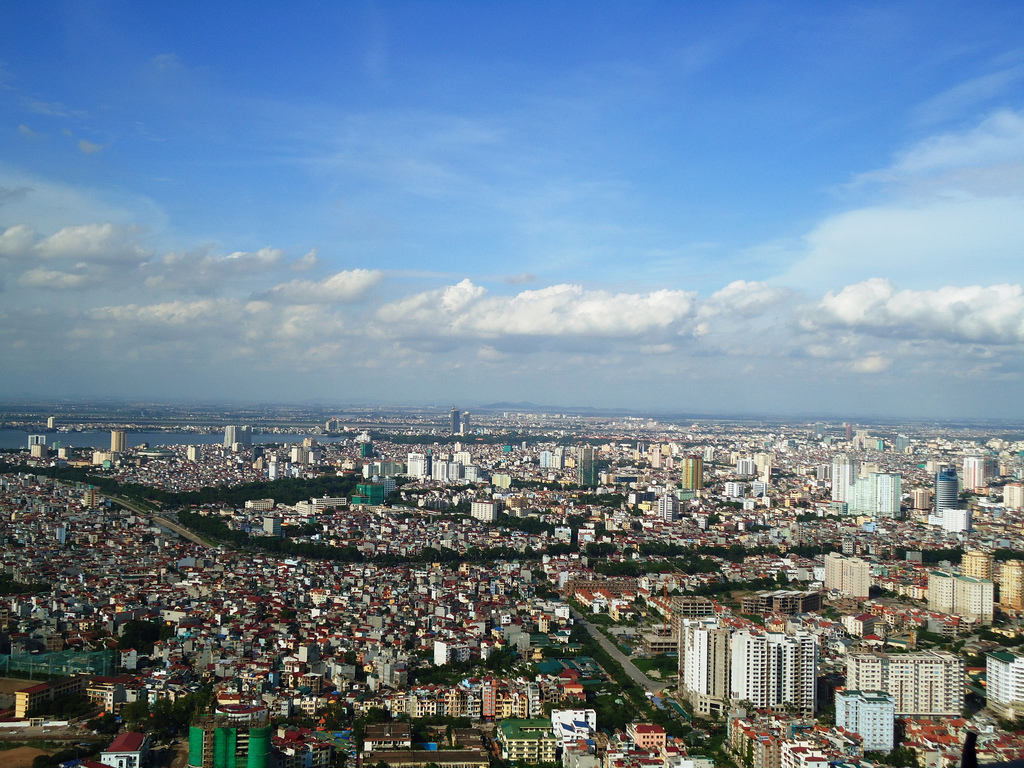
Hanoi is the capital of Vietnam.

== Territorial and regional data ==
=== Etymology ===
Flag	Common Name		Official name		ISO 3166 Country Codes			
Flag	Exonym	Endonym	Exonym	Endonym	ISO Short Name	Alpha-2 Code	Alpha-3 Code	Numeric
	Cambodia	កម្ពុជា	Kingdom of Cambodia	ព្រះរាជាណាចក្រកម្ពុជា	Cambodia	KH	KHM	116
	Laos	ປະເທດລາວ	Lao People's Democratic Republic	ສາທາລະນະລັດ ປະຊາທິປະໄຕ ປະຊາຊົນລາວ	Lao People's Democratic Republic (the)	LA	LAO	418
	Malaysia	Malaysia	Malaysia	Malaysia	Malaysia	MY	MYS	458
	Myanmar	မြန်မာနိုင်ငံ	Republic of the Union of Myanmar	ပြည်ထောင်စုသမ္မတမြန်မာနိုင်ငံတော်	Myanmar	MM	MMR	104
	Singapore	Singapore	Republic of Singapore	Republic of Singapore	Singapore	SG	SGP	702
	Thailand	ประเทศไทย	Kingdom of Thailand	ราชอาณาจักรไทย	Thailand	TH	THA	764
	Vietnam	Việt Nam	Socialist Republic of Viet Nam	Cộng hòa Xã hội chủ nghĩa Việt Nam	Viet Nam	VN	VNM	704

== See also ==
- Southeast Asia
  - Maritime Southeast Asia
  - Western Southeast Asia
- East Indies

Related regional concepts

- Mainland Southeast Asia linguistic area
- Southeast Asian Massif
- Sundaland
- Zomia

Sub-regions

- Golden Chersonese
- Golden Triangle
- Greater Mekong Subregion
