= Murut =

Murut may refer to:

- Murut people, an ethnic group of the northern inland regions of Borneo
- Murutic languages or Murut languages, spoken by those people
- Tagol Murut language, the most widely spoken of the Murutic languages
- Murut, Azerbaijan, a village
- Barnardia japonica, bulbous flowering plant also known as murut
