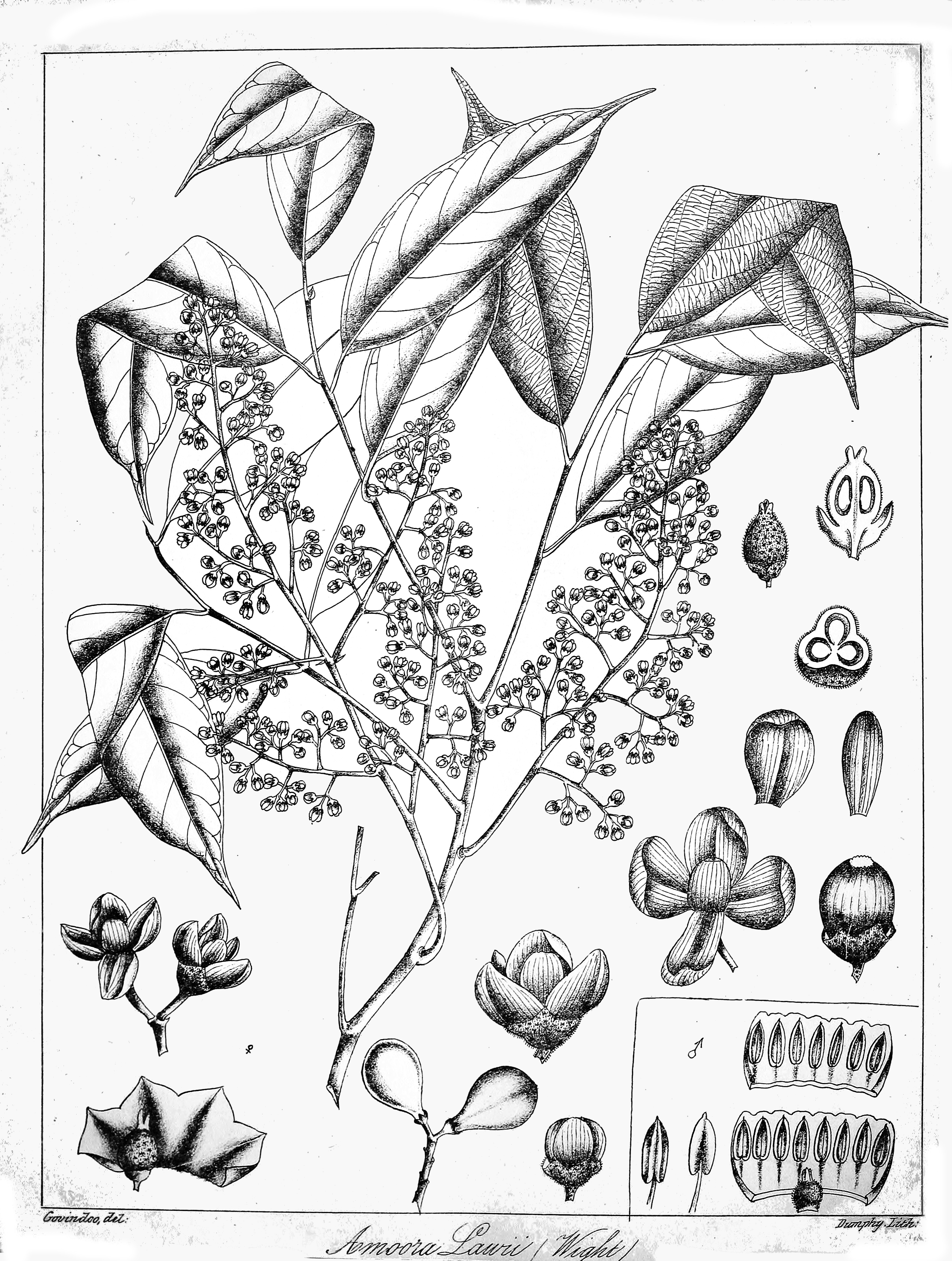

Conservation status
- Least Concern (IUCN 2.3)

Scientific classification
- Kingdom: Plantae
- Clade: Embryophytes
- Clade: Tracheophytes
- Clade: Angiosperms
- Clade: Eudicots
- Clade: Rosids
- Order: Sapindales
- Family: Meliaceae
- Genus: Aglaia
- Species: A. lawii

Binomial name
- Aglaia lawii (Wight) C.J.Saldanha

Synonyms
- List: *Aglaia alternifoliola Merr.; *Aglaia andamanica Hiern; *Aglaia attenuata H.L.Li; *Aglaia brachybotrys Merr.; *Aglaia cagayanensis Merr.; *Aglaia canarana (Turcz.) C.J.Saldanha; *Aglaia euryphylla Koord. & Valeton; *Aglaia eusideroxylon Koord. & Valeton; *Aglaia grandifoliola Merr.; *Aglaia haslettiana Haines; *Aglaia jainii M.V.Viswan. & K.Ramach.; *Aglaia korthalsii (Miq.) Pellegr., note:not Aglaia korthalsii Miq.; *Aglaia littoralis Zipp. ex Miq.; *Aglaia ouangliensis (H.Lév.) H.S.Lo; *Aglaia pedicellata (Hiern) Kosterm.; *Aglaia racemosa Ridl.; *Aglaia sclerocarpa C.DC.; *Aglaia stipitata P.T.Li & X.M.Chen; *Aglaia tamilnadensis N.C.Nair & R.Rajan; *Aglaia tenuifolia H.L.Li; *Aglaia tetrapetala Pierre; *Aglaia tsangii Merr.; *Aglaia turczaninowii C.DC.; *Aglaia wangii H.L.Li; *Aglaia yunnanensis H.L.Li; *Amoora calcicola C.Y.Wu & H.Li; *Amoora canarana (Turcz.) Hiern; *Amoora curtispica Gibbs; *Amoora duodecimantha H.Zhu & H.Wang; *Amoora dysoxyloides Kurz; *Amoora korthalsii Miq.; *Amoora lactescens Kurz; *Amoora lawii (Wight) Bedd.; *Amoora lepidota Merr.; *Amoora ouangliensis (H.Lév.) C.Y.Wu; *Amoora tetrapetala (Pierre) Pellegr.; *Amoora tetrapetala var. macrophylla (H.L.Li) C.Y.Wu; *Amoora tsangii (Merr.) X.M.Chen; *Amoora yunnanensis (H.L.Li) C.Y.Wu; *Epicharis exarillata Nimmo; *Lansium pedicellatum Hiern; *Lepiaglaia tetrapetala Pierre; *Nemedra nimmonii Dalzell; *Nimmoia lawii Wight; *Oraoma canarana Turcz.; *Ficus ouangliensis H.Lév.; *Ficus vaniotii H.Lév.

= Aglaia lawii =

Species of tree from Tropical Asia and China

Aglaia lawii

Scientific classification
- Kingdom: Plantae
- Clade: Embryophytes
- Clade: Tracheophytes
- Clade: Angiosperms
- Clade: Eudicots
- Clade: Rosids
- Order: Sapindales
- Family: Meliaceae
- Genus: Aglaia
- Species: A. lawii
- Subspecies: A. l. subsp. oligocarpa

Trinomial name
- Aglaia lawii subsp. oligocarpa (Miq.) Pannell

Synonyms
- List: *Aglaia maingayi (Hiern) King; *Aglaia oligocarpa Miq.; *Aglaia trimera Merr.; *Amoora maingayi Hiern

Aglaia lawii

Scientific classification
- Kingdom: Plantae
- Clade: Embryophytes
- Clade: Tracheophytes
- Clade: Angiosperms
- Clade: Eudicots
- Clade: Rosids
- Order: Sapindales
- Family: Meliaceae
- Genus: Aglaia
- Species: A. lawii
- Subspecies: A. l. subsp. submonophylla

Trinomial name
- Aglaia lawii subsp. submonophylla (Miq.) Pannell

Synonyms
- Aglaia submonophylla Miq.

Aglaia lawii is a species of tree in the family Meliaceae. As well as the autonym species, there are two subspecies accepted.

== Taxonomy ==
There are 2 subspecies accepted as well as the autonym species. They are:

- Aglaia lawii subsp. oligocarpa (Miq.) Pannell
- Aglaia lawii subsp. submonophylla (Miq.) Pannell

(See infoboxes, left lower)

The two areas where the greatest variation in A. lawii occurs are Mainland Southeast Asia and Borneo. The most widespread subspecies in Mainland Southeast Asia/western Malesia is A. lawii subsp. oligocarpa. The variation that occurs in Borneo was resolved by the recognition of the two subspecies and the species Aglaia beccarii C.DC (which is confined to Borneo, though there is a record from Philippines).

The species A. lawii was first described in 1976 by the Jesuit priest and botanist Cecil John Saldanha (1926/7–2002). Born in Mumbai, they were from around 1963 an academic and academic-administrator in Bangalore. Here they started the important work: Flora of the Hassan District, Karnataka, India. It was in this work, co-edited with the US botanist Dan Henry Nicolson and published in 1976, that the species was described in. This taxa was originally described in 1846 as Nimmola lawii by the Scottish surgeon and botanist Robert Wight (1796–1872), who worked in southern India. The epithet lawii is in tribute to John Sutherland Law (1810–1855), a British civil servant in Mumbai.

The two subspecies were described by the leading Aglaia botanist, Caroline M. Pannell, in 2004, in their paper: 'Three New Species, Two New Subspecies and Five New Combinations at the Subspecific Level in Aglaia Lour. (Meliaceae)'; published in the Kew Bulletin, basing the names on work published in 1868 by the Nederlander botanist Friedrich Anton Wilhelm Miquel (1811–1871). The subspecies epithet oligocarpa comes from the Ancient Greek oligo 'few' and karpos 'fruit'.

A. lawii has been shown to be in a clade with, to be most closely related to, Aglaia teysmanniana.

== Description ==
The species grows as a tree from 5 to 30 m (16 to 98 ft) tall. In Zhōngguó/China the tree flowers from May to December, fruiting is almost all year round.

Subspecies oligocarpa grows as a tree up to 30m tall and 40 cm diameter. The tree may flower when only around 2.5 m (8 ft 2 in) tall. Buttresses may be present, up to 90 cm (35 in) high. Bark may range in colour from reddish-, dark-, greyish-, greenish-brown to grey, pale-green, pale-yellow or white, inner bark ranges in colour from either pale green, yellow or orange-brown, to red, pink or white. The latex is white. Sapwood ranges from pale brown, to yellow and white, becoming pinker sometimes towards the heartwood. Its leaves are imparipinnate with a terete rachis. Indumentum has peltate scales, with a few to almost none on lower surface of leaflets. Fruit are subglobose. The differences to the autonym species are: the leaflets are less coriaceous with sparser indumentum. It is different to the closely related A. beccarii by: having an indumentum that is of peltate scales only; terete rachis that is not winged; when the seeds are dry the pericarp is not moulded around them.

The submonophylla subspecies grows as a small tree, no higher than 5m tall. Like the autonym species and the subspecies oligocarpa its indumentum is only of peltate scales; the leaf scales are few and mainly on the lower-leaflet-surface midrib; scales on the inflorescence are often with a fimbriate margin. The leaf rachis is not winged, it is terete. Unlike subspecies lawii (the autonym), it has simple leaves, though rarely leaves with two or three leaflets; and the leaves or leaflets are less coriaceous. The fruit has thin pericarp, and when dry it is moulded around the 1–3 seeds.

== Distribution ==
The species is native to an area in Tropical Asia, from Peninsular Malaysia to Taiwan and Bhutan. Countries and regions in which it is found are: Philippines; Indonesia (Kalimantan); Malaysia (Peninsular Malaysia); Thailand; Cambodia; Vietnam; Zhōngguó/China (Guangdong, Guangxi, Guizhou, Hainan); Taiwan; Laos; Myanmar; India (including Nicobar Islands, Andaman Islands); East Himalaya; southeast Tibet; Bhutan.

The oligocarpa subspecies is native to an area from west and central Malesia to Yunnan, Zhōngguó/China. Countries and regions where it occurs are: Philippines; Indonesia (Kalimantan, Sumatera); Malaysia (Sabah, Sarawak [mainly 1st and 3rd divisions], Peninsular Malaysia); Thailand; Vietnam; Zhōngguó/China (Yunnan); Laos.

The submonophylla subspecies is endemic to Kalimantan.

== Habitat and ecology ==
The tree occurs in evergreen and miced deciduous forests in Thailand, near streams on soils derived from granite, sandstone or limestone bedrock. It grows at altitudes from 30 to 1500m, most commonly at 250–700 m (820–2,300 ft) elevation. It flowers from March to December, mainly from March to August, with fruiting occurring from May to July

In Zhōngguó/China, the species grows in hilly regions forests, limestone-region forests, mountainous-region ravine rainforests, evergreen angiosperm forests and thickets. They occur at altitudes from near sea level to 1600m.

The taxa was rejected as a "framework tree species" by researchers in working on dry forests in Thailand. Framework tree species were indigenous forest taxa that on degraded sites could be planted to complement and accelerate forest ecosystem natural regeneration and biodiversity recovery. The tree was rejected as it had only a moderate survival rate after planting, a low crown size and did not have a substantial effect on weeds.

The oligocarpa subspecies is found in Kerangas-, mixed dipterocarp- and freshwater peat swamp-forests up to 600 m (2,000 ft) altitude. The seeds are eaten and dispersed a range of birds, as small as Pycnonotidae (bulbuls) to Corvidae (magpies) and Bucerotidae (hornbills).

At the Budo–Su-ngai Padi National Park, southern Thailand, the plant's fruit are part of the omnivorous diets of Buceros bicornis (great hornbill) and Buceros rhinoceros (rhinoceros hornbill). The major part of their diet is figs (Ficus sp.), with Polyalthia sp. and Aglaia spectabilis fruit dominating the remainder of the diet. Animals are also consumed, millipedes being most common.

In the oldest National Park of Thailand, Khao Yai National Park (central Thailand), the fruits of the species are eaten by a range of birds and a mammal: Ducula badia (mountain imperial pigeon); Anthracoceros albirostris (oriental pied hornbill); Megalaima incognita (moustached barbet); Ampeliceps coronatus (golden-crested myna); Gracula religiosa (hill myna); and Callosciurus finlaysonii (variable squirrel).

Leaves of the plant are eaten by Pygathrix cinerea (grey-shanked douc langurs) in Kon Ka Kinh National Park, central Vietnam. Young leaves followed by fruit make up most of the primates diet.

The subspecies submonophylla occurs in mixed dipterocarp forest on sandy clay soils. Observed as a riverine plant.

== Conservation ==
The IUCN RedList lists this taxa as of Least Concern (see infobox). They base this on the tree being widespread and locally common, but that the population is severely fragmented, has a continuing declines in the number of mature individuals and the area, extent and/or quality of habitat.

== Vernacular names ==
- mai hom (ไม้หอม), sang khriat (สังเครียด) (peninsular Thailand).
- sak ka ma (สักกะมา), sang ka tong (สังกะโต้ง) (southwestern Thailand)
- mak kong (หมากกอง) (central Thailand)
- khang khao (ค้างคาว) (eastern Thailand)
- ta suea (ตาเสือ) (northern Thailand)
- sey pi (Karen language)
- bângkèw sva: (Khmer language)
- bang kau sva (Kuy and/or Khmer speakers in north-central Cambodia)
- 望谟崖摩 wang mo ya mo (Standard Chinese)

Subspecies oligocarpa:

- segara (Iban language, Sarawak)
- lantupak (Dusun Kinabatangan/Eastern Kadazan language, Sabah)

== Uses ==
The aril is eaten in Thailand. In Cambodia, the small tree's young leaves and fruits are eaten, while the wood is used in temporary constructions.

Amongst Kuy- and Khmer-speaking people living in the same villages in Stung Treng and Preah Vihear Provinces of north-central Cambodia, the tree is used as a source of medicine and food.

The leaves of A. lawii are made as a decoction to treat headaches and as a tonic by Karen people in the Mae Chaem District, Thailand Lawa people, living alongside the Karen villagers, do not use the taxa as an ethnomedicinal plant, which indicates that cultural history and background are more important factors in ethnopharmacology than geographic area.

Subspecies oligocarpa is used as a source of timber. People in Philippines use the leaves to treat headaches, and boil the bark in water and then use that water to kill lice.
