= BQR =

BQR may refer to:

- By Queroseno Racing, a racing team
- Burusu language (by ISO 639-3 language code)
- Buffalo-Lancaster Regional Airport (by FAA location identifier)
