= Gana language =

Gana language may refer to:

- Gǁana language, a Khoe dialect cluster of Botswana
- Gana language (Nigeria)
- Gana’ language, an Austronesian language of Sabah, Malaysia
