= Üçbulaq =

Üçbulaq may refer to:

- Üçbulaq, Fizuli, Azerbaijan
- Üçbulaq, Goygol, Azerbaijan
