= Tanjong (disambiguation) =

Tanjong (Malay/Indonesian for "cape" or "headland"), alternatively spelled Tanjung, may refer to:

- Tanjong, investment company of Malaysia
- George Town, Penang (old name: Tanjong Penaga)
- Tanjong Pagar, a district in Singapore
- Constituencies in Malaysia:
  - Tanjong (federal constituency), represented in the Dewan Rakyat
  - Tanjong Barat (state constituency), formerly represented in the Penang State Legislative Assembly (1959–74)
  - Tanjong Selatan (state constituency), formerly represented in the Penang State Legislative Assembly (1959–74)
  - Tanjong Tengah (state constituency), formerly represented in the Penang State Legislative Assembly (1959–74)
  - Tanjong Utara (state constituency), formerly represented in the Penang State Legislative Assembly (1959–74)
  - Tanjong East (settlement constituency), formerly represented in the Penang Settlement Council (1955–59)
  - Tanjong West (settlement constituency), formerly represented in the Penang Settlement Council (1955–59)
- Tanjong, another name for the Austronesian tilted square sail
- Tanjong language

== See also ==
- Tanjung (disambiguation)
