= PNM =

PNM, or pnm, can refer to:

- Penitentiary of New Mexico, a US prison
- People's National Movement, a political party in Trinidad and Tobago
  - Tobago Council of the People's National Movement
- PNM Resources. electricity and gas supplier, New Mexico, US
- pnm, the ISO 639-3 code for the Punan Batu language of Sarawak
- PNM, the National Rail code for Penmere railway station, Cornwall, UK
- Pop'n Music, a music video game series
- Portable anymap, graphics file formats
- Nationalist Party of Mexico (Partido Nacionalista de México), a defunct Mexican political party
