= Kanowit (disambiguation) =

Kanowit may refer to:

- Kanowit, a town and the capital of a district of the same name, located within the Sibu Division, Sarawak, Malaysia
- Kanowit (federal constituency), represented in the Dewan Rakyat
- Kanowit language, also called Serau Tet Kanowit (language of the Kanowit people), is an Austronesian language spoken in Sarawak, Malaysia on the island of Borneo
