= Kinabatangan language =

Austronesian language spoken in Malaysia

Kinabatangan
- Lobu
- Native to: Malaysia
- Region: Sabah
- Ethnicity: ca. 15,000 Lobu (1985–2015)
- Native speakers: 4,000 (Lanas Lobu) (2015)
- Language family: Austronesian: Malayo-Polynesian; North Bornean; Southwest Sabahan; Paitanic; Kinabatangan

Language codes
- ISO 639-3: Variously: dmg – Upper Kinabatangan ruu – Lanas Lobu (Rumanau) low – Tampias Lobu
- Glottolog: uppe1426

Kinabatangan is a language of Sabah, Malaysia.
