= Sian language =

Kajang language spoken in Malaysia and Brunei

Sian
- Sihan
- Native to: Malaysia, Brunei
- Region: Sarawak
- Native speakers: (50 cited 2000)
- Language family: Austronesian: Malayo-Polynesian; North Bornean; Melanau–Kajang; Outer Central Sarawak; Sian

Language codes
- ISO 639-3: spg
- Glottolog: sian1255
- ELP: Sian

Sian (Sihan) is a Kajang language of Brunei and Sarawak.
