= Rumanau people =

Ethnic group in Malaysia

Rumanau people Lobu people
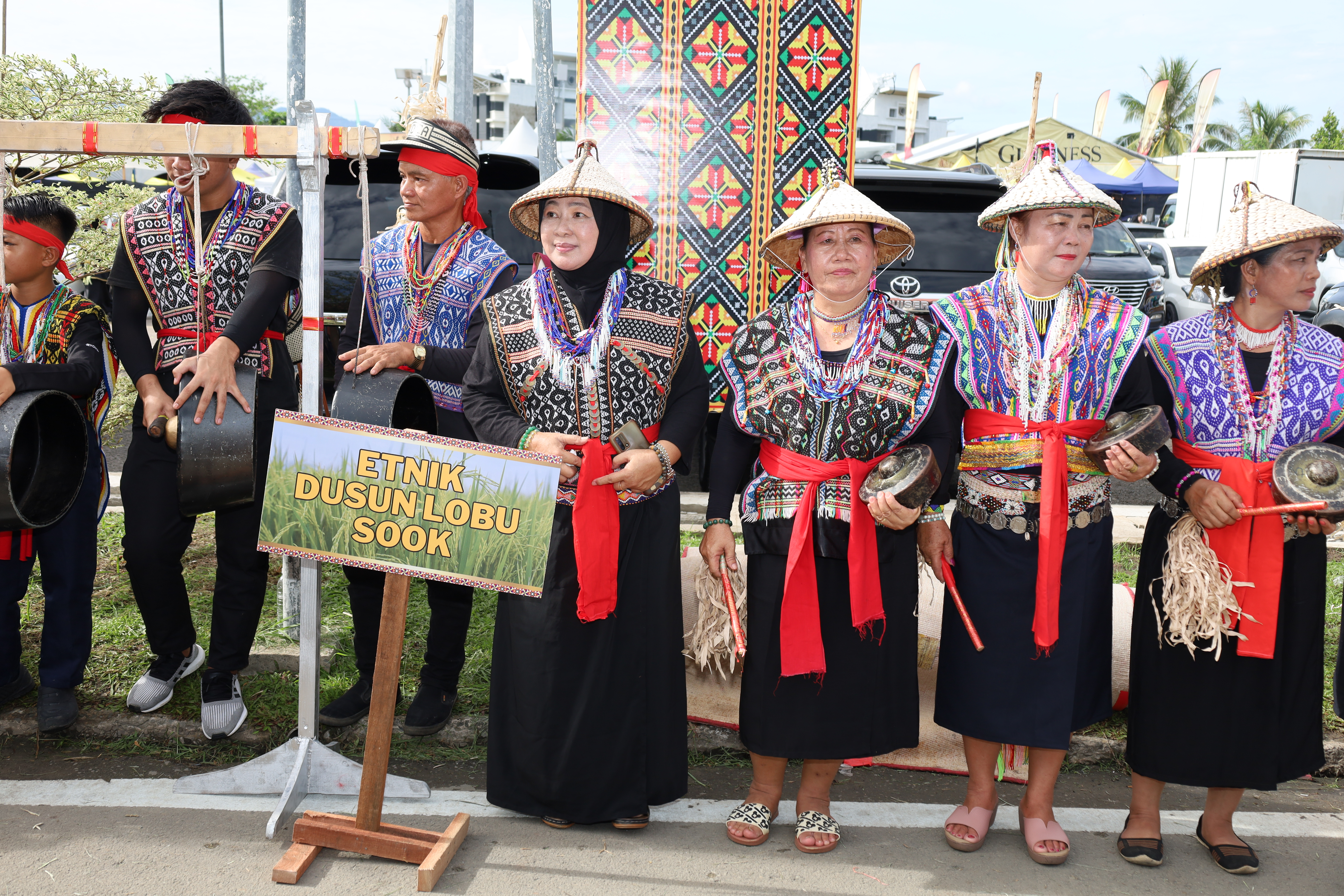
- The Rumanau of Sook, Keningau District, in their traditional dress

Total population
- 5,000

Regions with significant populations
- Malaysia (Sabah)

Languages
- Lobu, Malaysian (Sabah Malay)

Religion
- Folk religion (predominantly), Christianity, and Islam

Related ethnic groups
- Kadazan-Dusun, Murut

The Rumanau are an indigenous ethnic group residing in Sabah, eastern Malaysia on the island of Borneo. They are known as the Lobu in the Keningau District near Lanas, and the Rumanau in the Masaum, Mangkawagu, Minusu areas of the Kinabatangan District along the Kinabatangan River, in Sandakan Division. Their population was estimated at 2,800 in the year 1991. They are a sub-group of the Kadazan-Dusun, although their language (ISO 639-3 ruu) belongs to the Paitanic branch of the Austronesian language family.

== Etymology ==
The Rumanau people derived their name from two words "ru" and "ranah". The word ru is equivalent to the English phrase "to be with" or "to work with", and ranah refers to "wet earth" or "muddy soil". Thus the named Rumanau people means people who work with muddy soil. Wet paddy cultivation is the only known occupation among Kadazan-Dusun which involves "working with muddy soil". The Rumanau were the first ethnic group migrating out from Nunuk Ragang to acquire the skill of wet paddy cultivation. The paddy cultivation phase in Momolianism evolution had a big impact on the Rumanau people.
