= Dumpas language =

Austronesian language spoken in Sabah, Malaysia

Dumpas
- Region: Sabah
- Native speakers: (1,100 cited 2000)
- Language family: Austronesian: Malayo-Polynesian; North Bornean; Southwest Sabahan; Dusunic; Dumpas

Language codes
- ISO 639-3: dmv
- Glottolog: dump1242
- ELP: Dumpas

Dumpas is a Dusunic language of Malaysia.

== Classification ==
Although King & King (1984) classifies Dumpas as Paitanic, Lobel (2013:396-398) classifies Dumpas as a Dusunic language that is particularly closely related to Sungai Karamuak (also called Sukang), but has been heavily influenced by neighboring Paitanic languages.

Presently, Dumpas is located north of Beluran town, where it is surrounded by Paitanic languages such as Sungai Paitan, Tombonuwo, Lingkabau, and Sungai Beluran (Lobel 2013). Tidung and Tausug are also spoken in the area.
