= Tanjung =

A tanjung is a cape, and it is an extremely common geographical name in the Malay world. It may refer to:

- George Town, Penang in the Malay language
- Tanjung, Brebes, a district of Central Java
- Tanjung, Lombok, the capital city of North Lombok Regency, in West Nusa Tenggara province of Indonesia
- Tanjung, Tabalong, the capital city of Tabalong Regency, in South Kalimantan province of Indonesia
- Tanja sail or Tanjung, another name for the Austronesian tilted square sail

== See also ==
- Tanjong (disambiguation)
