= Klias River Kadazan language =

Austronesian language spoken in Sabah, Malaysia

Klias River Kadazan
- Native to: Malaysia
- Region: Sabah
- Ethnicity: Kadazan
- Native speakers: (1,000 cited 1984)
- Language family: Austronesian: Malayo-Polynesian; North Bornean; Southwest Sabahan; Dusunic; Dusun; Klias River Kadazan

Language codes
- ISO 639-3: kqt
- Glottolog: klia1235

Klias River Kadazan is an Austronesian language of Sabah, Malaysia.
