= Keningau Murut language =

Murutic language spoken on Borneo

Keningau Murut
- Central Murut
- Native to: Malaysia
- Region: Borneo
- Ethnicity: 7,000 Murut (2000)
- Native speakers: (1,000–1,200 cited 1985)
- Language family: Austronesian: Malayo-Polynesian; North Bornean; Southwest Sabahan; Murutic; Northern; Keningau Murut

Language codes
- ISO 639-3: kxi
- Glottolog: keni1249
- ELP: Keningau Murut

Keningau Murut, or Central Murut, is a language spoken by the Murut people of Borneo.
