= Kalabakan language =

Language

Kalabakan
- Tidong
- Native to: Malaysia
- Region: Sabah
- Ethnicity: 2,200 Tidung people (2000)
- Language family: Austronesian: Malayo-Polynesian; North Bornean; Southwest Sabahan; Murutic; Eastern; Kalabakan

Language codes
- ISO 639-3: kve
- Glottolog: kala1391

Kalabakan (Kalabakan Murut) is a Sabahan language spoken by members of the Tidong ethnic group in Kalabakan District, Sabah, Malaysia.
