= Selungai Murut language =

Language

Selungai Murut
- Native to: Malaysia, Indonesia
- Region: Borneo
- Ethnicity: Murut
- Native speakers: (1,200 cited 2000)
- Language family: Austronesian: Malayo-Polynesian; North Bornean; Southwest Sabahan; Murutic; Eastern; Selungai Murut

Language codes
- ISO 639-3: slg
- Glottolog: selu1243

Selungai Murut is a language spoken by the Murut people of Borneo.
