= Murutic languages =

Austronesian language family of Borneo

Murutic
- Geographic distribution: Sabah and North Kalimantan, Borneo
- Linguistic classification: Austronesian: Malayo-Polynesian; Greater North Bornean?; North Bornean?; Sabahan?; Southwest; Murutic
- Subdivisions: Murut proper; Tagol Murut; Timugon Murut; Bookan Murut

Language codes
- Glottolog: grea1294

The Murutic languages are a family of half a dozen closely related Austronesian languages, spoken in the northern inland regions of Borneo by the Murut and Tidung.

== Languages ==
The Murutic languages are:

- Murut proper

Timugon Murut and Tagol Murut

- Murut dialects

Keningau Murut, Beaufort Murut (Binta'), Tabalunan/Serudung Murut, Selungai Murut, Sembakung Murut, Okolod, Bookan, Tanggala Murut, Paluan, Agabag/Tinggalan Murut.

- Tidung language

Burusu, Kalabakan, Nonukan Tidong, Sesayap Tidong

Tagol Murut is commonly used and understood by a large majority of the Murut peoples.

Lobel (2013) also lists the languages Abai Sembuak, Abai Tubu, and Bulusu (all spoken near Malinau town in North Kalimantan) as Murutic languages. On the other hand, Abai Sungai, spoken in eastern Sabah, is a Paitanic language.

=== Lobel (2016) ===
Lobel (2016) covers the following Greater Murutic languages, including Tidong:

- Tatana
- Papar
- Murut Nabaay
- Ganaʼ
- Murut Timugon
- Murut Paluan
- Murut Tagol
- Kolod
- Western Tingalan
- Eastern Tingalan
- Murut Kalabakan
- Abai Sembuak
- Abai Tubu
- Bulusu
- Tidung Bengawong
- Tidung Sumbol
- Tidung Kalabakan
- Tidung Mensalong
- Tidung Malinau

== Innovations ==
Lobel (2013) lists the following Murutic phonological innovations. (Note: PSWSAB stands for Proto-Southwest Sabahan, while PMP stands for Proto-Malayo-Polynesian.)

- PMP/PSWSAB *R > *h / __ V (except after *ə, where it had already shifted to *g in PSWSAB). Subsequently, Proto-Greater Murutic *h > Ø occurred in all daughter languages except Papar.
- PMP/PSWSAB *R > *g / __ #
- PMP/PSWSAB *aw > *ow; *ay > *oy
- PMP/PSWSAB *iw > *uy
- PGMUR *g- > Ø after the adjectival prefix *ma-
- PMP/PSWSAB *ə > *a in non-final syllables, except in the environment *_Cə, where it is reflected as /o/
