= Sekapan language =

Austronesian language spoken in Sarawak, Malaysia

Sekapan
- Native to: Malaysia
- Region: Sarawak
- Ethnicity: Sekapan
- Native speakers: (750 cited 1981)
- Language family: Austronesian: Malayo-Polynesian; North Bornean; Melanau-Kajang; Kajang; Sekapan

Language codes
- ISO 639-3: skp
- Glottolog: seka1248

Sekapan is a Kajang language of Sarawak, Malaysia.
