= Daro-Matu language =

Austronesian language spoken in Malaysia

Daro-Matu
- Native to: Malaysia
- Region: Sarawak
- Ethnicity: Melanau people
- Native speakers: (7,600 cited 1981)
- Language family: Austronesian: Malayo-Polynesian; North Bornean; Melanau–Kajang; Melanau; Daro-Matu
- Dialects: Daro; Matu

Language codes
- ISO 639-3: dro
- Glottolog: daro1239

Daro and Matu are dialects of an Austronesian language spoken in Sarawak, Borneo.
