= Punan Batu language =

Endangered Austronesian language of Malaysia

Punan Batu
- Punan Batu 1
- Native to: Malaysia
- Region: Sarawak
- Native speakers: (30 cited 2000)
- Language family: Austronesian: Malayo-Polynesian; North Bornean; Melanau–Kajang; Outer Central Sarawak; Punan Batu

Language codes
- ISO 639-3: pnm
- Glottolog: puna1278
- ELP: Punan Batu 1

Punan Batu is a nearly extinct language of Sarawak.
