= Sembakung language =

Sabahan language spoken on Borneo

Sembakung Murut
- Tidong
- Native to: Indonesia, Malaysia
- Region: Borneo
- Ethnicity: Tidung people
- Native speakers: (3,200 in Indonesia; ethnic population of 2,000 in Malaysia cited 2000)
- Language family: Austronesian: Malayo-Polynesian; North Bornean; Southwest Sabahan; Murutic; Eastern; Sembakung Murut

Language codes
- ISO 639-3: sbr
- Glottolog: semb1240

Sembakung Murut, or Sembakung, and also known as Tinggalan, is one of several Sabahan languages of Borneo spoken by the Tidong people.
