= Paitanic languages =

Group of languages

Paitanic
- Geographic distribution: Sabah
- Linguistic classification: Austronesian: Malayo-Polynesian; North Bornean; Southwest Sabahan; Greater Dusunic; Paitanic

Language codes
- Glottolog: pait1248

The Paitanic languages are a group of languages spoken in the Malaysian state of Sabah in Borneo by the Paitan people. Several go by the name Lobu.

== Languages ==
The Paitanic languages are Tombonuwo, Kinabatangan, Abai Sungai, and Serudung.

Dumpas may also belong here. Furthermore, Lobel (2013) classifies Murut Serudung as a Paitanic language.

=== Lobel (2016) ===
Lobel (2016) covers the following Paitanic languages:

- Sungai Beluran
- Lobu Tampios
- Lobu Lanas
- Sungai Kuamut
- Murut Serudong
