= Paluan language =

Murutic language spoken on Borneo

Paluan
- Native to: Malaysia
- Region: Borneo
- Ethnicity: Murut
- Native speakers: (5,500 cited 2000)
- Language family: Austronesian: Malayo-Polynesian; North Bornean; Southwest Sabahan; Murutic; Northern; Paluan

Language codes
- ISO 639-3: plz
- Glottolog: palu1253

Paluan is a language spoken by the Murut people of Borneo. The principal dialects are Paluan (Peluan) itself and Pandewan.
