= Bookan language =

Murutic language spoken in Malaysia

Bookan
- Baukan Murut
- Native to: Malaysia
- Region: Borneo
- Ethnicity: 2,400 (2017)
- Language family: Austronesian: Malayo-Polynesian; North Bornean; Southwest Sabahan; Murutic; Northern; Bookan
- Writing system: Latin

Language codes
- ISO 639-3: bnb
- Glottolog: book1241

Bookan, or Baukan Murut, is a moribund language of the Murut people of Sabah, Malaysia.
