= Timugon language =

Austronesian language spoken in Sabah, Malaysia

Timugon Murut
- Native to: Malaysia
- Region: Sabah
- Ethnicity: 9,000 (2004)
- Language family: Austronesian: Malayo-Polynesian; North Bornean; Southwest Sabahan; Murutic; Northern; Timugon Murut
- Dialects: Beaufort Murut (Binta’)
- Writing system: Latin

Language codes
- ISO 639-3: tih
- Glottolog: timu1262

Timugon Murut is a language spoken by the Murut people of Borneo.
