= Burusu language =

Austronesian language

Burusu
- Native to: Indonesia
- Region: Borneo
- Ethnicity: Burusu people
- Native speakers: 4,400 (2007)
- Language family: Austronesian: Malayo-Polynesian; North Bornean; Southwest Sabahan; Murutic; Northern; Burusu

Language codes
- ISO 639-3: bqr
- Glottolog: buru1304

Burusu or Bulusu, is an Austronesian language of North Kalimantan, spoken by the Burusu people, a Dayak subgroup.
