= Abai language =

Murutic language spoken on Borneo

Abai
- Abai Tubu–Abai Sembuak
- Native to: Indonesia
- Region: Borneo
- Language family: Austronesian: Malayo-Polynesian; North Bornean; Southwest Sabahan; Murutic; Abai

Language codes
- ISO 639-3: None (mis)
- Glottolog: abai1241

Abai is a Murutic language of Borneo spoken in by the Abai people in the villages of Sembuak and Tubu. Ethnologue mistakenly classifies it as a dialect of Putoh.
