= Ganaʼ language =

Austronesian language of Sabah, Malaysia

Ganaʼ
- Ganaq
- Native to: Malaysia
- Region: Sabah
- Ethnicity: 2,000 (2013)
- Native speakers: 250 (2013)
- Language family: Austronesian: Malayo-Polynesian; North Bornean; Southwest Sabahan; Murutic; Northern; Ganaʼ
- Writing system: Unwritten; informal Latin

Language codes
- ISO 639-3: gnq
- Glottolog: gana1277
- ELP: Gana

Ganaʼ (Gana, Ganaq) is an Austronesian language of Sabah, Malaysia.

Since Ganaʼ and Kujau, a Dusunic language, are both spoken in and around Keningau town, Gana has a significant proportion of Dusunic loanwords, although it is originally a Murutic language.
