= Coastal Kadazan language =

Dusunic language spoken on Borneo

Coastal Kadazan
- Bo'os Kadazan
- Dusun Tangara
- Native to: North Borneo (East Malaysia)
- Region: Sabah and Federal Territory of Labuan
- Ethnicity: 220,000 Kadazan people (2018)
- Native speakers: (undated figure of 200,000)
- Language family: Austronesian: Malayo-Polynesian; North Bornean; Southwest Sabahan; Dusunic; Dusun; Coastal Kadazan
- Standard forms: Kadazandusun

Official status
- Recognised minority language in: Malaysia (as Kadazandusun)
- Regulated by: Multiple (?): Kadazandusun Cultural Association Sabah; Kadazandusun Language Foundation; United Sabah Dusun Association; Kadazan Society Sabah

Language codes
- ISO 639-3: dtp
- Glottolog: coas1294

Coastal Kadazan, also known as Dusun Tangara, is a dialect of Central Dusun as well as a minority language primarily spoken in Sabah, Malaysia. It is the primary dialect spoken by the Kadazan people on the west coast of Sabah especially in the districts of Penampang, Papar and Membakut (sub-district of Beaufort).

== Characteristics ==
The use of Coastal Kadazan has been declining due to the tenure of Mustapha Harun as Sabah Chief Minister whose government enforced Bahasa Malaysia while suppressing other vernacular languages with the objective of assimilation and cementing allegiance to Malaysian federal government; and by the use of English by missionaries, which was done through the method of language shift enforced by the work of both the colonial and federal governments. The state of Sabah has introduced policies to prevent this decline, which is also happening to other native Sabahan languages. This included the policy of using Kadazan and other indigenous languages in public schools. Efforts have also been done to allow the language to become official in the state.

Coastal Kadazan has adopted many loanwords, particularly from other northern Borneo indigenous languages and also Malay. Kadazan extensively employs the voiced alveolar sibilant fricative /z/ in their native lexicons, a feature found in only a few Austronesian languages. The Tsou and Paiwan languages also have these particular elements, spoken by the Taiwanese aborigines. Another language is Malagasy spoken in the island of Madagascar thousands of miles away off the coast of Africa.

Coastal Kadazan is highly mutually intelligible with Central Dusun and is considered by many to be the same language.

== History ==
The language was suppressed with many other Sabahan vernacular languages under Mustapha Harun's ministership in favour of an assimilationist policy enforcing Bahasa Malaysia across the state.

Under the efforts of the Kadazandusun Cultural Association Sabah, in 1995, the central Bundu-Liwan dialect (Central Dusun) was selected to serve as the basis for a standardised "Kadazandusun" language. This dialect was selected as it was deemed to be the most mutually intelligible when conversing with other "Dusun" or "Kadazan" dialects.

== Phonology ==
Miller (1993) lists the following phonemes:

Consonants
		Labial	Alveolar	Velar	Glottal
Nasal		m	n	ŋ	
Plosive	voiceless	p	t	k	ʔ
Plosive	voiced	b	d	ɡ	
Plosive	implosive	ɓ	ɗ		
Fricative	voiceless		s		h
Fricative	voiced	v	z		
Lateral			l		

Vowels
	Front	Central	Back
Close	i		u
Mid			ɤ~o
Open		a	

/o/ ranges from weakly rounded to unrounded. Four borrowed consonants from Malay and English include /dʒ r w j/.

== Sample prayers ==
=== Our Father ===
Tama za doid surga, obitua daa o ngaan nu, koikot no daa kopomolintaan nu, kaandak nu, adadi doiti id tana miaga doid Surga. Pataako dagai do tadau diti, oh takanon za do tikid tadau, om pohiongo zikoi do douso za, miaga dagai do popohiong di pinapakaus doid dagai. Kada zikoi pohogoso doid koimbazatan, katapi pahapaso zikoi mantad kalaatan. Amen.

[Our Father, who art in heaven, hallowed be thy name. Thy kingdom come, Thy will be done on earth as it is in heaven. Give us this day our daily bread, and forgive us our sins, as we forgive those who sin against us. Do not lead us into temptation, but deliver us from evil. Amen.]

=== Hail Mary ===
Ave Maria, noponu do graasia, miampai diau o Kinoingan, obitua ko do id saviavi tondu, om obitua o tuva' tinan nu Jesus. Sangti Maria, tina' do Kinoingan, pokiinsianai zikoi tu' tuhun do momimidouso, baino om ontok jaam do kapatazon za. Amen.

[Hail Mary, full of grace, the Lord is with you. Blessed are you amongst women, and blessed is the fruit of thy womb, Jesus. Holy Mary, Mother of God, pray for us, sinners, now and at the hour of our death. Amen.]

== Austronesian languages comparison table ==
Below is a table of Kadazan and other Austronesian languages comparing thirteen words.

English	one	two	three	four	person	house	dog	coconut	day	new	we (inclusive)	what	fire
Kadazan	iso	duvo	tohu	apat	tuhun	hamin	tasu	piasau	tadau	vagu	tokou	onu	tapui
Dusun	iso	duo	tolu	apat	tulun	walai	tasu	piasau	tadau	wagu	tokou	onu/nu	tapui
Tombulu (Minahasa)	esa	zua (rua)	telu	epat	tou	walé	asu	po'po'	endo	weru	kai, kita	apa	api
Tagalog	isa	dalawa	tatlo	apat	tao	bahay	aso	niyog	araw	bago	tayo	ano	apoy
Central Bikol	saro	duwa	tulo	apat	tawo	harong	ayam	niyog	aldaw	ba-go	kita	ano	kalayo
Rinconada Bikol	əsad	darwā	tolō	əpat	tawō	baləy	ayam	noyog	aldəw	bāgo	kitā	onō	kalayō
Waray	usa	duha	tulo	upat	tawo	balay	ayam/ido	lubi	adlaw	bag-o	kita	anu	kalayo
Cebuano	usa/isa	duha	tulo	upat	tawo	balay	iro	lubi	adlaw	bag-o	kita	unsa	kalayo
Hiligaynon	isa	duha	tatlo	apat	tawo	balay	ido	lubi	adlaw	bag-o	kita	ano	kalayo
Aklanon	isaea, sambilog, uno	daywa, dos	tatlo, tres	ap-at, kwatro	tawo	baeay	ayam	niyog	adlaw	bag-o	kita	ano	kaeayo
Kinaray-a	sara	darwa	tatlo	apat	tawo	balay	ayam	niyog	adlaw	bag-o	kita	ano	kalayo
Tausug	hambuuk	duwa	tu	upat	tau	bay	iru'	niyug	adlaw	ba-gu	kitaniyu	unu	kayu
Maranao	isa	dowa	t'lo	phat	taw	walay	aso	neyog	gawi'e	bago	tano	tonaa	apoy
Kapampangan	metung	adwa	atlu	apat	tau	bale	asu	ngungut	aldo	bayu	ikatamu	nanu	api
Pangasinan	sakey	dua	duara	talo	talora	apat	apatira	too	abong	aso	niyog	ageo	balo
Ilocano	maysa	dua	tallo	uppat	tao	balay	aso	niog	aldaw	baro	datayo	ania	apoy
Ivatan	asa	dadowa	tatdo	apat	tao	vahay	chito	niyoy	araw	va-yo	yaten	ango	apoy
Ibanag	tadday	dua	tallu	appa'	tolay	balay	kitu	niuk	aggaw	bagu	sittam	anni	afi
Yogad	tata	addu	tallu	appat	tolay	binalay	atu	iyyog	agaw	bagu	sikitam	gani	afuy
Gaddang	antet	addwa	tallo	appat	tolay	balay	atu	ayog	aw	bawu	ikkanetam	sanenay	afuy
Tboli	sotu	lewu	tlu	fat	tau	gunu	ohu	lefo	kdaw	lomi	tekuy	tedu	ofih
Malay (incl. Malaysian and Indonesian)	satu	dua	tiga	empat	orang	rumah	anjing	kelapa, nyiur	hari	baru, baharu	kita	apa	api
Javanese	siji	loro	telu	papat	uwong	omah	asu	klapa/kambil	hari	anyar/enggal	kita	apa/anu	geni
Acehnese	sa	duwa	lhèë	peuët	ureuëng	rumoh/balèë	asèë	u	uroë	barô	(geu)tanyoë	peuë	apuy
Lampung	sai	khua	telu	pak	jelema	lamban	asu	nyiwi	khani	baru	kham	api	apui
Buginese	sedi	dua	tellu	eppa	tau	bola	asu	kaluku	esso	baru	idi'	aga	api
Toba Batak	sada	dua	tolu	opat	halak	jabu	biang	harambiri	ari	baru	hita	aha	api
Tetum	ida	rua	tolu	haat	ema	uma	asu	nuu	loron	foun	ita	saida	ahi
Samoan	tasi	lua	tolu	fa	tagata	fale	taifau	niu	aso	fou	matou	ā	afi
Māori	tahi	rua	toru	wha	tangata	whare	kuri	kokonati	ra	hou	taua	aha	ahi
Tuvaluan	tasi	lua	tolu	fā	toko	fale	kuri	moku	aso	fou	tāua	ā	afi
Hawaiian	kahi	lua	kolu	hā	kanaka	hale	'īlio	niu	ao	hou	kākou	aha	ahi
Banjarese	asa	duwa	talu	ampat	urang	rūmah	hadupan	kalapa	hari	hanyar	kita	apa	api
Malagasy	isa	roa	telo	efatra	olona	trano	alika	voanio	andro	vaovao	isika	inona	afo
Iban	satu	dua	tiga	empat	orang	rumah	asu	nyur	ari	baru	kitai	nama	api
Melanau	satu	dua	telou	empat	apah	lebok	asou	nyior	lau	baew	teleu	nama	apui
