= Tagol language =

Austronesian language spoken in Borneo

Tagol Murut
- Native to: Malaysia, Indonesia
- Region: Borneo
- Ethnicity: 50,000 (2015)
- Native speakers: 20,000 in Malaysia (2015)
- Language family: Austronesian: Malayo-Polynesian; North Bornean; Southwest Sabahan; Murutic; Northern; Tagol Murut
- Writing system: Latin

Language codes
- ISO 639-3: mvv
- Glottolog: taga1273

The Tagol Murut language is spoken by the Tagol (highland) subgroup of the Murut people, and serves as the lingua franca of the whole group. It belongs to the Bornean subdivision of the Austronesian language family. Tagol Murut people can be found in Sabah and Sarawak, usually in areas around Sipitang, Tenom, Lawas, Limbang, and along the border areas shared with Brunei and Indonesia.

== Phonology ==
=== Consonants ===
		Labial	Alveolar	Palatal	Velar	Glottal
Nasal		m	n		ŋ	
Plosive/ Affricate	voiceless	p	t		k	ʔ
Plosive/ Affricate	voiced	[b]	[d]	(dʒ)	[ɡ]	
Fricative		β	s			h
Rhotic			r			
Approximant		w	l	j		

/dʒ/ occurs only in recent loanwords.

Sounds /β r h/ are heard as voiced stops [b, d, ɡ] in word-initial and word-medial position, when preceded by nasal consonants.

=== Vowels ===
Vowels are heard as /i, a, o, u/.
