= Eastern Kadazan language =

Austronesian language spoken in Sabah, Malaysia

Eastern Kadazan
- Labuk-Kinabatangan Kadazan
- Native to: Malaysia
- Region: Sabah
- Native speakers: 20,600 (2000) (only 5% of children learn it)
- Language family: Austronesian: Malayo-Polynesian; North Bornean; Southwest Sabahan; Dusunic; Dusun; Eastern Kadazan
- Writing system: Latin

Language codes
- ISO 639-3: dtb
- Glottolog: labu1249

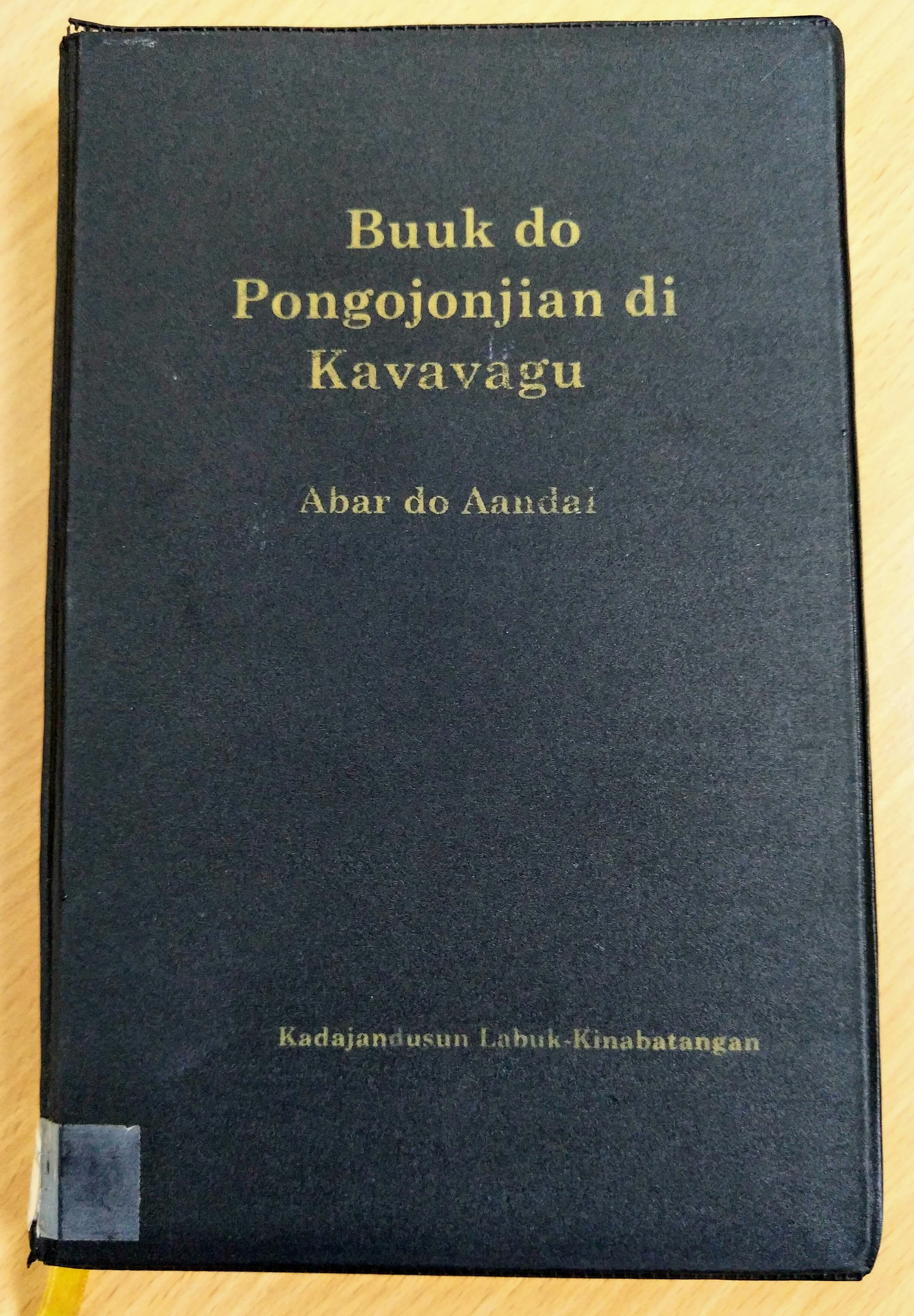
A translation of the Bible into the Labuk Kinabatangan language of Malaysia.

Eastern Kadazan, also known as Labuk Kadazan, Kinabatangan Kadazan, or Sungai, is an Austronesian language primarily spoken in Sabah, Malaysia.

== Phonology ==
Consonants
		Labial	Alveolar	Palatal	Velar	Glottal
Nasal		m	n		ŋ	
Plosive	voiceless	p	t		k	(ʔ)
Plosive	voiced	b	d	dʒ ~ ʒ	ɡ	
Fricative		β	s	dʒ ~ ʒ		
Approximant		w	l, ɫ	j		
Rhotic			r			

/dʒ/ may also range to a fricative [ʒ] among speakers.

The glottal stop /ʔ/ only appears in a few words.

Vowels
	Front	Central	Back
Close	i		u
Mid		ə ~ o	
Open		a	

/ə/ may also range to [o].
