= Sungai language =

Austronesian language spoken in Sabah, Malaysia

Abai Sungai
- Native to: Malaysia
- Region: Sabah
- Ethnicity: 500 Tambanuo or Orang Sungai (2000)
- Language family: Austronesian: Malayo-Polynesian; North Bornean; Southwest Sabahan; Paitanic; Abai Sungai
- Writing system: Unwritten

Language codes
- ISO 639-3: abf
- Glottolog: abai1240
- ELP: Abai Sungai
- Abai Sungai is classified as Definitely Endangered by the UNESCO Atlas of the World's Languages in Danger.

Sungai, or Abai Sungai after the village in which it is spoken, is a minor language of Sabah, Malaysia.
