= Üçbulaq, Goygol =

Üçbulaq Մուռուտ • Murut
- Location within Azerbaijan
- Coordinates: 40°31′03″N 46°17′04″E
- Country: Azerbaijan
- District: Goygol

Population
  - Total: 192
- Time zone: UTC+4 (AZT)

Üçbulaq (Uchbulag, lit. 'three springs'; Armenian: Մուռուտ, romanized: Murut, official name until 1999). is a village and municipality in the Goygol District of Azerbaijan. The village had an Armenian population before the exodus of Armenians from Azerbaijan after the outbreak of the Nagorno-Karabakh conflict.

== Demographics ==
It has a population of 192.
