= Okolod language =

Language of the Murutic family

Kolod
- Okolod
- Native to: Malaysia, Indonesia
- Region: Borneo
- Native speakers: (5,000 cited 2000)
- Language family: Austronesian: Malayo-Polynesian; North Bornean; Southwest Sabahan; Murutic; Eastern; Kolod

Language codes
- ISO 639-3: kqv
- Glottolog: okol1241

Okolod, or Kolod, is a language spoken by the Murut people of Borneo.
