= Serudung language =

Sabahan language spoken on Borneo

Serudung Murut
- Tidong
- Native to: Indonesia, Malaysia
- Region: Borneo
- Ethnicity: 1,000 Tidung people (2015)
- Native speakers: 400 (2015)
- Language family: Austronesian: Malayo-Polynesian; North Bornean; Southwest Sabahan; Paitanic; Serudung Murut
- Writing system: Unwritten

Language codes
- ISO 639-3: srk
- Glottolog: seru1246

Serudung Murut, or Serudung, is a Sabahan language spoken by members of the Tidong ethnic group in Kalabakan District, Sabah, Malaysia.
