= Kanowit language =

Austronesian language spoken in Malaysia

Kanowit
- Tanjong
- Native to: Malaysia, Brunei
- Region: Sarawak and neighboring Brunei
- Ethnicity: Melanau people
- Native speakers: (200 cited 2000)
- Language family: Austronesian: Malayo-Polynesian; North Bornean; Melanau–Kajang; Melanau; Kanowit

Language codes
- ISO 639-3: kxn
- Glottolog: kano1244
- ELP: Kanowit-Tanjong

The Kanowit language, also called Serau Tet Kanowit (language of the Kanowit people), is an Austronesian language spoken in Sarawak, Malaysia on the island of Borneo. It is mutually intelligible with the Tanjong (alternatively spelled Tanjung) language, which is spoken even further upriver near the town of Kapit. Tanjong may be a separate language from Kanowit. However, both languages currently share the denomination kxn in ISO 639-3. Kanowit is primarily spoken in Kampung Bedil, a village located approximately one mile up the Rajang River from Kanowit Town.

== Vocabulary ==
Some Kanowit vocabulary translated into English:

Kanowit	English
bahah	'husked rice', 'seed'
balak	'banana'
buyaʔ	'because'
kapan	'thick'
kəbeh	'die'
lakəy	'old (age)'
mañit	'sharp'
məlut	'sleep'
mərəw	'woman'
musuŋ	'lips', 'beak'
nəlabaw	'ask'
ñaga	'to fry'
pəloʔon	'ten'
sak	'red', 'ripe'
sidəp	'aflame'
supat	'swollen'
təjalaŋ	'rhinoceros hornbill'
tənawan	'person'
tigah	'straight'
ubaʔ	'word'
ubəl	'mute'
