= Melanau–Kajang languages =

Subgroup of the Austronesian language family

Melanau–Kajang
- Central Sarawak
- Geographic distribution: Indonesia and Malaysia (Borneo)
- Linguistic classification: Austronesian: Malayo-Polynesian; Greater North Borneo; Melanau–Kajang
- Subdivisions: Kajang (Kayang); Melanau; Punan–Müller-Schwaner

Language codes
- Glottolog: sara1342

The Melanau–Kajang languages, or Central Sarawak languages, are a group of languages spoken in Kalimantan, Indonesia and Sarawak, Malaysia by the Kenyah, Melanau and related peoples.

== Classification ==
=== Smith (2017) ===
Smith (2017) uses the term Central Sarawak, and puts it as an independent branch within the Greater North Borneo subgroup. He classifies the languages as follows.

- Melanau (Dalat, Sarikei, Mukah, Balingian, Matu, Sibu, Kanowit)
- Kajang (Kejaman, Sekapan, Lahanan)
- Punan–Müller-Schwaner
  - Punan
    - Punan Bah, Punan Tubu, Sajau
    - Punan Lisum, Punan Aput, Beketan, Ukit, Buket
  - Müller-Schwaner
    - Hovongan
    - Kereho, Aoheng, Seputan

== Austroasiatic influence ==
Kaufman (2018) notes that many Proto-Central Sarawak words are of likely Austroasiatic origin, including the following (Note: The Austroasiatic branch reconstructions are from Paul Sidwell's reconstructions; Proto-Pearic is from Headley (1985)).

- *siaw ‘chicken’ (cf. Proto-Khasic *sʔiar; Proto-Khmuic *(s)ʔiər)
- *tilaŋ ‘tiger leech’ (cf. Proto-Katuic *ɟləəŋ)
- *(ə)liŋ ‘saliva’

Proto-Kajang words of likely Austroasiatic origin:

- *diə̯k ‘chicken’ (cf. Proto-Pearic *hlɛːk)
- *(u)bəl ‘mute’ (cf. Proto-Bahnaric *kmlɔː)

Proto-Müller-Schwaner words of likely Austroasiatic origin:

- *ənap ‘fish scale’
