= List of contemporary ethnic groups of Asia =

List of Asian ethnic groups

The following is a list of contemporary ethnic groups of Asia. There has been constant debate over the classification of ethnic groups. Membership of an ethnic group tends to be associated with shared ancestry, history, homeland, language or dialect and cultural heritage; where the term "culture" specifically includes aspects such as religion, mythology and ritual, cuisine, dressing (clothing) style and other factors.

By the nature of the concept, ethnic groups tend to be divided into subgroups, may themselves be or not be identified as independent ethnic groups depending on the source consulted.

Asia here is considered to be approximately delimited from Oceania by the Weber Line in Wallacea located east of the Indonesian islands of Sulawesi, the Sula Archipelago, East Nusa Tenggara, and Barat Daya. It is delineated from Europe by Anatolia at the border between the Kocaeli and Istanbul Provinces, the Sea of Marmara, the Dardanelles, and the Aegean Islands, with those administered by Turkey being considered part of Asia and those by Greece being part of Europe; by the Greater Caucasus mountains with the North Caucasus being part of Europe and the South Caucasus being part of Asia; by Siberia at the border of the Volga, Northwestern, and Ural federal districts; and by Asian Kazakhstan at the border of the West Kazakhstan and Atyrau regions to the west and the Aktobe and Mangystau regions to the east and south. It is delimited from Africa by the Red Sea, Suez Canal, Bab-el-Mandeb, and Gulf of Aden; and from North America by the Chukchi Sea, Bering Strait, and Bering Sea along the Baker-Shevardnadze line. This does not fully align with conventional delimitations of Asia and is used primarily as a matter of convenience, as many publications about ethnic groups will only specify locations down to provinces, making more precise delimitation impractical.

== Ethnic groups ==
The following groups are commonly identified as "ethnic groups", as opposed to ethno-linguistic phyla, national groups, racial groups or similar.

Ethnicity	Language(s)	Primary homeland	Subgroups, tribes & castes	Religion(s)
Abkhazians	Northwest Caucasian → Abaza–Abkhaz → Abkhaz	Georgia (Abkhazia) (Note: Following the Caucasian War, the majority of Circassians and Abkhazians were deported to Turkey.)	Sadz, Afro-Abkhazians, Byzb, Abzhui, Samurzakanians	Christianity → Eastern Orthodoxy → Abkhazian Orthodoxy; Islam → Sunnism
Acehnese	Austronesian → Malayo-Polynesian → Acehnese	Indonesia (Aceh)		Islam → Sunnism
Achomi	Indo-European → Indo-Iranian → Achomi	Iran (Irahistan)		Islam → Sunnism
Adi	Sino-Tibetan → Tani → Adi, Padam, Bori	India (Arunachal Pradesh), China (Tibet)	Padam, Bori	Donyi-Polo, Christianity, Buddhism
Afghan Qizilbash	Indo-European → Indo-Iranian → Dari; Historically Turkic → Common Turkic → Turkmen	Afghanistan (Herat, Kabul, Kandahar)		Islam → Shia Islam → Twelver Shi'ism
Afghan Tatars	Turkic → Common Turkic → Tatar → Afghan Tatar; Indo-European → Indo-Iranian → Dari, Pashto (Note: Language family; with some exceptions, all speakers of the various languages within this family are typically seen as one singular ethnicity.); Turkic → Common Turkic → Uzbek; Turkic → Common Turkic → Turkmen	Afghanistan (Afghan Turkestan)		Islam → Sunnism → Hanafism
African Americans	Indo-Europeans → Germanic → English → African-American Vernacular English; Afroasiatic → West Semitic → Modern Hebrew	Israel (Dimona)		African Hebrew Israelite religion
Afro-Emiratis	Afroasiatic → West Semitic → Gulf Arabic → Emirati Arabic	United Arab Emirates		Islam
Afro-Iranians	Indo-European → Indo-Iranian → Persian	Iran (Southern Iran)		Islam → Shia Islam
Afro-Iraqis	Afroasiatic → West Semitic → Mesopotamian Arabic	Iraq (Basra Governorate)		Islam → Shia Islam
Afro-Jordanians	Afroasiatic → West Semitic → Levantine Arabic → Jordanian Arabic	Jordan		Islam
Afro-Omanis	Afroasiatic → West Semitic → Gulf Arabic → Omani Arabic	Oman		Islam
Afro-Palestinians	Afroasiatic → West Semitic → Levantine Arabic → Palestinian Arabic	Palestine		Islam, Christianity
Afro-Saudis	Afroasiatic → West Semitic → Hejazi Arabic	Saudi Arabia (Hejaz)		Islam
Afro-Syrians	Afro-Asiatic → West Semitic → Levantine Arabic → Syrian Arabic	Syria (Daraa Governorate)		Islam
Afro-Turks	Turkic → Common Turkic → Turkish → Anatolian Turkish	Turkey		Islam
Ahoms	Kra–Dai → Tai → Ahom (Note: Assamese ethnic group; the vast majority only speak Assamese.)	India (Assam, Arunachal Pradesh)		Hinduism, Ahom religion
Aimaq	Indo-European → Indo-Iranian → Aimaq	Afghanistan	Aimaq Hazara, Firozkohi, Jamshidi, Aimaq Kipchaks, Timuri, Taymani	Islam → Sunni Islam
Ainus	Ainu → Hokkaido Ainu; Historically Ainu → Sakhalin Ainu, Kuril Ainu	Japan (Hokkaido, Tōhoku region), Russia (Sakhalin, Kamchatka Peninsula, Khabarovsk Krai), Kuril Islands (Russia or Japan)	Hokkaido Ainus (including Ishikari Ainus, Menasunkur Ainus, Sumunkur Ainus, and Uchiura Ainus), Tokyo Ainus, Sakhalin Ainus, Russian Ainus	Animism → Ainu folk religion Buddhism → Mahayana → Nichiren Shōshū; Shinto; Christianity → Eastern Orthodoxy → Russian Orthodoxy
Akha	Sino-Tibetan → Loloish → Akha	China (Pu'er and Xishuangbanna) (Note: Some time around 1860s, many Akha have been migrating to Myanmar, Laos, and Thailand. Today, the majority reside outside of China.)	Akeu	Animism
Akhvakhs	Northeast Caucasian → Avar–Andic → Akhvakh	Azerbaijan (Zagatala District)		Islam
Alaskan Creoles	Eskaleut → Aleut; Indo-European → Balto-Slavic → Russian; Historically Eskaleut and Indo-European → Aleut and Russian → Mednyj Aleut	Russia (Commander Islands)		Christianity → Eastern Orthodoxy
Aleuts	Eskaleut → Aleut	Russia (Commander Islands)		Christianity → Eastern Orthodoxy
Altaians	Turkic → Common Turkic → Southern Altai; Turkic → Common Turkic → Northern Altai	Russia (Altai Republic and Altai Krai), Mongolia (Altai Mountains), China (Altay Prefecture)		Altai faith
Alyutors	Chukotko-Kamchatkan → Chukotkan → Alyutor	Russia (Koryak Okrug)		Shamanism; Christianity → Eastern Orthodoxy
Amis	Austronesian → East Formosan → Amis	Taiwan (Taitung and Hualien Counties)		Animism, Christianity
Aneuk Jamèë	Austronesian → Malayo-Polynesian → Minangkabau → Jamee (Note: Due to the influence of assimilation into Acehnese culture, most Aneuk Jamee people use Acehnese as their everyday language.)	Indonesia (Aceh)		Islam
Anglo-Burmese	Indo-European → Germanic → English; Sino-Tibetan → Lolo-Burmese → Burmese; Sino-Tibetan → Karenic → Karen	Myanmar		Christianity → Catholicism, Protestantism → Anglicanism; Buddhism
Anglo-Indians	Indo-Europeans → Germanic → English	India	Significant populations in Bangladesh	Christianity
Arabs	Afroasiatic → West Semitic → Arabic; Arab Sign languages Al-Sayyid Bedouin Sign; Kafr Qasem Sign; DGSic → Israeli Sign; Historically Afroasiatic → Arabic → Shirvani Arabic	West Asia (especially the Arabian Peninsula and Syrian Desert),	Bedouins (including Palestinian Bedouins (including Jahalin Bedouins, Negev Bedouins (including Al-Sayyid Bedouins and Hanajira), Galilee Bedouins, Ta'amreh), Tarabin Bedouins, Bedul, Beni Ades, Liyathnah), Israeli Arabs, Palestinians (including Palestinian Christians, Palestinian Baháʼís, Palestinian Muslims (including Palestinian Metawalis), Palestinian Bedouins, and Afro-Palestinians), Egyptian Arabs, Iranian Arabs (including Khuzestani Arabs, Khorasani Arabs, Huwalas, and Khamseh Arabs), Marsh Arabs, Arab Christians (including Antiochian Greek Christians and Jerusalemite Greek Christians), Alawites, Matāwila, Druze (including Lebanese Druze, Syrian Druze, Israeli Druze, Jordanian Druze), Hadharem, Mhallami, Baharna (including in Kuwait),Muhamasheen, diaspora populations (including the Palestinian diaspora) in the Caucasus, Turkey, Pakistan (including Palestinians), India, the Philippines	Islam; Christianity → Eastern Orthodoxy → Greek Orthodoxy; Christianity → Catholicism → Melkite Catholicism; Druzism
Aranadans	Dravidian → Malayalamoid → Eranadan	India (Kerala)		Hinduism
Armenians	Indo-European → Armenian; Armenian Sign; Historically Harsneren	Armenian highlands (Armenia, Turkey (Western Armenia)), (Note: During the Armenian genocide that occurred in Western Armenia, many Armenians fled to Russia, France, and the United States. Today, the majority reside outside of Greater Armenia, and Western Armenia no longer has an openly Armenian population (the Hemshin largely avoid identifying themselves as being Armenian, while the vast majority of people that are openly Armenian in Turkey reside in Istanbul, which is not a part of Western Armenia).) Azerbaijan, Georgia	Turkish Armenians (including Armenians in Istanbul, Hemshin, and Hidden Armenians), Armeno-Tats, Zoks, Hayhurum, Karabakhis and historically Udis and Turkic peoples who adhered to the Armenian Apostolic Church, along with significant populations in Cyprus, Georgia (including Samtskhe–Javakheti, Abkhazia, and Tbilisi), Azerbaijan (including Baku), Egypt, Lebanon, Pakistan, Iran, Qatar, Iraq, Kuwait, Syria, the United Arab Emirates, Israel, Jordan, China, India, Bangladesh, Myanmar, Singapore, Israel and Palestine	Christianity → Oriental Orthodoxy, Catholicism → Eastern Catholicism → Armenian Catholicism
Assamese	Indo-European → Indo-Iranian → Assamese; Historically Sino-Tibetan → Chutia	India (Assam)	Assamese Brahmins, Kalitas, Kaibartas, Assamese Muslims, Chutias	Hinduism
Assyrians	Afroasiatic → West Semitic → Aramaic	Assyrian homeland (Iraq, Iran, Syria, Turkey)	Assyrian tribes, Citadel Christians, Mhallami, Chaldean Catholics	Christianity → Syriac Christianity
Asurs	Austroasiatic → Munda → Asur–Birjia	India (Bihar, Jharkhand)	Bir, Asur, Birjia, Agaria	Animism and Hinduism → Asur religion
Atayals	Austronesian → Atayalic → Atayal; Japonic → Japanese-based creole → Yilan Creole Japanese	Taiwan		Animism, Christianity
Ati	Ati language	Philippines (Western Visayas)		Animism; Christianity
Atoni	Austronesian → Malayo-Polynesian → Uab Meto–Amarasi	Indonesia (West Timor), East Timor (Oecusse)	Amarasi	Christianity
Avars	Northeast Caucasian → Avar–Andic → Avar; Northeast Caucasian → Lezgic → Archi	Azerbaijan (Balakan, Zagatala), Turkey, Georgia	Archis, Kvareli Avars	Islam → Sunni Islam
Awadhis	Indo-European → Indo-Iranian → Awadhi	India (Awadh)		Hinduism
Äynu	Turkic and Indo-European → Uyghur and Persian → Äynu; Turkic → Common Turkic → Uyghur	China (Xinjiang)		Islam → Shi'ism → Alevism
Azerbaijanis	Turkic → Common Turkic → Azeri, Afshar, Sonqori, Turkmen → Ersari; Francosign → RSLic → Russian Sign → Azerbaijani Sign	Azerbaijan, Iran (Iranian Azerbaijan), Armenia, Turkmenistan (Balkan Region, Lebap Region), Uzbekistan (Bukhara Region), Russia (Dagestan)	Ayrums, Baharlu, Bayat, Karadaghis, Qajars, Küresünni, Padar, Qarapapaqs, Shahsevan, Karapapakhs, Yeraz, Dagestani Azerbaijanis, Afghan Qizilbash, Iranian Azeris (including Afshars (including Urmian Afshars), Sonqoris) along with significant populations in Georgia, and historically Armenia	Islam → Shi'ism
Badagas	Dravidian → Badaga–Kannada → Badaga	India (Nilgiris district)		Hinduism
Bahnar	Austroasiatic → Bahnaric → Bahnar	Vietnam (Central Highlands)		Animism
Bai	Sino-Tibetan → Macro-Bai → Bai	China (Dali Bai Autonomous Prefecture, Bijie, Sangzhi County)		Buddhism, Benzhuism, Taoism
Balangao	Austronesian → Malayo-Polynesian → Balangao	Philippines (Cordillera Administrative Region)		Anitism
Balinese	Austronesian → Malayo-Polynesian → Balinese	Indonesia (Bali)	Bali Mula	Hinduism → Balinese Hinduism, Folk Hinduism (Bali Mula)
Balochs	Indo-European → Indo-Iranian → Balochi	Balochistan (Pakistan (Balochistan), Iran (Sistan and Baluchestan), Afghanistan (Balochistan))	Askani, Bajkani, Bangulzai, Barazani, Bhurgari, Bugti, Buledi, Chandio, Darzada, Dehwar, Dodai, Dombki, Gabol, Ghazini, Jatoi, Kalmati, Khetran, Kunara, Langhani, Lango, Lashkrani, Loharani, Lund, Marri, Mazari, Mengal, Mirali, Mugheri, Muhammad Shahi, Mullazai, Nothazai, Pitafi, Qaisrani, Rind, Sadozai, Sethwi, Shaikhzadah, Talpur, Tauki, Umrani, Yarahmadzai, Zardari, Makrani, Punjabi Balochs, Sindhi Balochs, Uttar Pradeshi Baluchs, along with significant populations in the United Arab Emirates (including Al Balushi), Iran	Islam → Sunni Islam
Baltis	Sino-Tibetan → Tibetic → Balti	Pakistan (Gilgit-Baltistan)		Islam → Shi'ism
Bamars	Sino-Tibetan → Burmish → Burmese; Historically Sino-Tibetan → Burmish → Hpon	Myanmar	Bamars proper, Taungyo, Yaw, Yabein, Anglo-Burmese	Buddhism → Theravada Buddhism; Burmese folk religion
Banjara	Indo-European → Rajasthani → Lambadi	India (Mewar)		Hinduism
Banjars	Austronesian → Malayic → Banjarese	Indonesia (South Kalimantan)		Islam → Sunnism
Basseri	Indo-European → Indo-Iranian → Basseri	Iran (Fars Province)		Islam → Shia Islam
Bataks	Austronesian → Northwest Sumatra–Barrier Islands → Batak	Indonesia (North Sumatra)	Angkola, Karo, Mandailing, Pakpak, Simalungun, Toba, Alas, Kluet, Singkil	Christianity → Protestantism → Lutheranism; Islam → Sunnism; Malim, Pemena
Batek	Austroasiatic → Asilan → Batek	Malaysia (Pahang, Kelantan, Teregganu)		Animism
Bazigar	Indo-European → Indo-Iranian → Bazigar	India (Punjab, Haryana, Uttar Pradesh, Delhi, Chandigarh, Himachal Pradesh, Jammu and Kashmir, Rajasthan), Pakistan (Punjab)		Hinduism
Bengalis	Indo-European → Indo-Iranian → Bengali, Sylheti, Noakhali; Indo-Pakistani–Nepali Sign → Indo-Pakistani Sign → Bengali Sign	Bengal (Bangladesh, India)	Bengali Muslims, Bengali Hindus (including Mahishyas), Bengali Buddhists, Bengali Christians, Bangals (including Sylhetis, Dhakaiyas (including Mahifarash), Noakhalis), Ghotis (including Muslim Ghosi, Lodha Muslims), Shershabadia, Mahimal	Islam → Sunnism; Hinduism → Shaktism, Vaishnavism, Hindu atheism Christianity → Catholicism, Protestantism; Buddhism → Theravada
Betawis	Austronesian → Malay-based creole → Betawi	Indonesia (Jakarta)		Islam → Sunni Islam
Bhils	Indo-European → Indo-Iranian → Bhil	India (Madhya Pradesh, Gujarat, Rajasthan, Maharashtra)	Barda, Bhagalia, Bhilala, Bhil Gametia, Bhil Garasia, Bhil Kataria, Bhil Mama, Bhil Mavchi, Dholi Bhil, Dungri Bhil, Damor, Dungri Garasia, Mewasi Bhil, Nirdhi Bhil, Rawal Bhil, Tadvi Bhil, Vasava, Bhil Meena, Chaudhri, Bagdi	Hinduism
Bhojpuris	Indo-European → Indo-Iranian → Bhojpuri	India, Nepal	Paswan, Teli	Hinduism, Jainism
Bhumijs	Austroasiatic → Munda → Bhumij (Note: Due to their historical low status in India, the majority only speak Bengali.)	India (West Bengal, Odisha, Jharkhand)		Sarnaism
Bhutia	Sino-Tibetan → Tibetic → Sikkimese	India (Sikkim)		Buddhism → Vajrayana Buddhism
Bicolanos	Austronesian → Philippine → Bikol	Philippines (Bicol Region)	Central Bikol, Sorsoganons, Catandunganons, Rinconada, Albayanon	Christianity → Catholicism
Bidayuh	Austronesian → Malayo-Polynesian → Land Dayak	Malaysia (Sarawak)	Kendayan, Selako, Bakatiʼ, Sara Bakati', Laraʼ, Bukar–Sadong, Biatah, Tringgus, Jagoi, Jangkang, Kembayan, Semandang, Ribun, Nyaduʼ, Sanggau	Christianity
Bimanese	Austronesian → Malayo-Polyneisan → Bima	Indonesia (Sumbawa)		Islam
Bisayas	Austronesian → Dusunic → Sabah Bisaya, Brunei Bisaya	Brunei, Malaysia (Sabah, Sarawak)	Sabah Bisaya, Brunei Bisaya	Islam, Christianity
Bishnupriyas	Indo-European → Bengali-based creole → Bishnupriya Manipuri	India (Manipur), Bangladesh		Hinduism → Vaishnavism
Blaan	Austronesian → Philippine → Blaan	Philippines (Soccsksargen)		Anitism
Bontoc	Austronesian → Malayo-Polynesian → Bontoc, Ilocano, Tagalog	Philippines (Cordillera Administrative Region)		Anitism
Boro	Sino-Tibetan → Sal → Boro	India (Bodoland)	Mech	Bathouism, Hinduism
Bouyei	Kra–Dai → Tai → Bouyei	China (Guizhou)		Moism
Brahuis	Dravidian → Northern Dravidian → Brahui	Pakistan (Balochistan)	Raisani, Jhalawan, Sarawan, Mengal (including Zagar and Zakria Zae), Sasoli	Islam → Sunni Islam → Hanafi
Bru	Austroasiatic → Katuic → Bru	Laos (Savannakhet province), Vietnam (Quảng Binh and Quảng Trị provinces)		Satsana Phi, Buddhism → Theravada Buddhism
Buginese	Austronesian → South Sulawesi → Buginese	Indonesia (South Sulawesi)		Islam, Christianity, folk religion
Bugkalot	Austronesian → Malayo-Polynesian → Bugkalot, Ilocano, Tagalog	Philippines (Cordillera Administrative Region)		Anitism
Bugun	Sino-Tibetan → Kho-Bwa → Bugun	India (Arunachal Pradesh)		Donyi-Polo, Hinduism, Christianity
Bunak	Trans–New Guinea → Timor–Alor–Pantar → Bunak	Indonesia (West Timor), East Timor		Christianity → Catholicism
Bunun	Austronesian → Bunun	Taiwan (Nantou)		Animism, Christianity
Burushos	Burushaski	Pakistan (Gilgit-Baltistan)		Islam → Shi'ism → Isma'ilism
Buryats	Mongolic → Central Mongolic → Buryat, Khalkha → Sartul, Tsongol	Russia (Buryatia), China (Inner Mongolia), Mongolia	Barga	Buddhism → Tibetan Buddhism; Shamanism → Mongolian shamanism; Christianity → Eastern Orthodoxy
Butonese	Austronesian → Malayo-Polynesian → Buton, Wolio	Indonesia (Buton)		Islam
Chaharmahali Turks	Turkic → Common Turkic → Chaharmahali Turkic	Iran (Chaharmahal)		Islam → Shi'ism → Twelver Shi'ism
Chakmas	Indo-European → Indo-Iranian → Chakma	Bangladesh (Chittagong Hill Tracts)		Buddhism → Theravada Buddhism
Chams	Austronesian → Malayo-Polynesian → Chamic	Champa (Cambodia, Vietnam), China (Hainan)	Churu, Jarai, Rade, Raglai, Utsuls	Islam → Sunnism, Shi'ism → Bani Islam; Hinduism
Chechens	Northeast Caucasian → Nakh → Chechen	Georgia (Pankisi, Kakheti, Tusheti), Turkey (Muş Province), Iraq (Sulaymaniyah Governorate)	Kists, Chechen Kurds, Terloys, other teips, with significant populations in Jordan, Syria, Turkey	Islam → Sunnism; Historically Vainakh religion
Chelkans	Turkic → Common Turkic → Northern Altai → Chelkan	Russia (Altai Republic, Kemerovo Oblast)		Christianity → Eastern Orthodoxy; Burkhanism, Shamanism
Chepang	Sino-Tibetan → Chepangic → Chepang	Nepal		Hinduism
Chinese Tatars	Turkic → Common Turkic → Tatar → Chinese Tatar; Sino-Tibetan → Chinese → Mandarin	China (Xinjiang)		
Chittagonians	Indo-European → Indo-Iranian → Chittagonian	Chittagong region		Islam → Sunnism
Cho Ro	Austroasiatic → Bahnaric → Chrau	Vietnam (Dong Nai, Binh Duong, Binh Phuoc, Ba Ria-Vung Tau)		Animism; Buddhism → Theravada
Cholanaikkans	Dravidian → South Dravidian I → Cholanaikkan	India (Kerala)		Animism
Chuanqing	Sino-Tibetan → Sinitic → Mandarin Chinese → Southwestern Mandarin	China (Guizhou)		Ethnic religion
Chukchis	Chukotko-Kamchatkan → Chukotkan → Chukchi	Russia (Chukchia, Sakha Republic, Magadan Oblast, Kamchatka Krai)		Christianity → Eastern Orthodoxy → Russian Orthodoxy; Shamanism
Chulyms	Turkic → Common Turkic → Chulym	Russia (Tomsk Oblast, Krasnoyarsk Krai)		Christianity → Eastern Orthodoxy → Russian Orthodoxy
Chuvans	Indo-European → Balto-Slavic → Russian; Chukotko-Kamchatkan → Chukotkan → Chukchi; historically Yukaghir → Chuvan	Russia (Chukotka)		Christianity → Eastern Orthodoxy → Russian Orthodoxy
Cina Kampung	Kra–Dai, Austronesian, and Sino-Tibetan → Southern Thai, Kelantan–Pattani Malay, and Hokkien → Kelantan Peranakan Hokkien	Malaysia (Kelantan)		Buddhism and Chinese folk religion → Theravada and Chinese ancestor worship → Cina Kampung religion
Cirebonese	Austronesian → Malayo-Polynesian → Javanese → Cirebonese	Indonesia (Cirebon)		Islam
Damia	Indo-European → Indo-Iranian → Dameli	Pakistan (Chitral District)		Islam
Daurs	Mongolic → Dagur	China (Inner Mongolia, Heilongjiang, Xinjiang)		Shamanism
Deccanis	Indo-European → Indo-Iranian → Hindustani → Deccani	India (Deccan)	Hyderabadi Muslims	Islam → Sunnism → Sufism; Islam → Shi'ism → Isma'ilism → Nizari Isma'ilism
Dhimal	Sino-Tibetan → Dhimalish → Dhimal	Nepal		Hinduism, Kiratism
Dogras	Indo-European → Indo-Iranian → Dogri	India (Jammu Division)		Hinduism
Dolgans	Turkic → Common Turkic → Dolgan	Russia (Krasnoyarsk Krai)		Christianity → Eastern Orthodoxy → Russian Orthodoxy, Shamanism
Doms	Indo-European → Indo-Iranian → Domari, Garachi	Azerbaijan, Middle East	Garachi, with significant populations in Egypt, Israel, Libya, Syria	Islam, Judaism
Dongxiangs	Mongolic → Shirongolic → Santa	China (Gansu)		Islam → Sunnism
Dönmeh	Turkic → Common Turkic → Turkish; Indo-European → Hellenic → Greek	Turkey, Greece		Sabbateanism
Dubla	Indo-European → Indo-Iranian → Dubli (Note: Due to their historical low status in India, the majority only speak Gujarati.)	India (Gujarat)		Hinduism
Dukha	Turkic → Common Turkic → Taiga Sayan Turkic → Dukhan	Mongolia (Khövsgöl Province)		Shamanism → Dukha indigenous religion
Dutch Burghers	Indo-European → Germanic → English → Sri Lankan English	Sri Lanka		Christianity → Protestantism
Egyptians	Afroasiatic → West Semitic → Egyptian Arabic; Historically Afroasiatic → Egyptian → Coptic (Note: The original Egyptian language, which morphed into the Coptic language around the 1st century AD, died out as a spoken language around the 17th century and is now only used for religious ceremonies. Today, the Egyptians, including the Copts, speak Lower and Upper Egyptian Arabic.); Egyptian Sign	Egypt (Sinai Peninsula)	Copts, Sa'idi	Islam → Sunni Islam; Christianity → Oriental Orthodoxy → Coptic Orthodoxy; Christianity → Catholicism → Eastern Catholicism → Coptic Catholicism
Enets	Uralic → Samoyedic → Enets	Russia (Krasnoyarsk Krai)		Shamanism
Eurasian Singaporeans	Indo-European → Germanic → English	Singapore		Christianity
Evenks	Tungusic → Northern Tungusic → Evenki	Russia, China		Shamanism
Evens	Tungusic → Northern Tungusic → Even; Turkic → Common Turkic → Yakut; Historically Tungusic → Northern Tungusic → Arman	Russia (Kamchatka Krai, Magadan Oblast, Sakha)	Tungus, Tiugesir, Memel', Buiaksir, Arman	Shamanism
Franco-Indians	Indo-European → Romance → French → Indian French	India (Puducherry)		Christianity → Catholicism
Fuyu Kyrgyz	Turkic → Common Turkic → Fuyu Kyrgyz	China (Fuyu County)		Buddhism → Vajrayana → Tibetan Buddhism
Gaddang	Austronesian → Malayo-Polynesian → Gaddang (Note: Otherwise known as Cagayan.)	Philippines (Cagayan Valley, Cordillera Administrative Region)	Ga'dang, Gaddang proper, Yogad, Maddukayang, Katalangan, Iraya	Christianity → Catholicism, Protestantism
Garhwalis	Indo-European → Indo-Iranian → Garhwali	India (Uttarakhand)		Hinduism
Garos	Sino-Tibetan → Sal → Garo	India (Garo Hills)		Christianity, Songsarek
Gayonese	Austronesian → Northwest Sumatra–Barrier Islands → Gayo	Indonesia (Bener Meriah, Central Aceh, and Gayo Lues Regencies)		Islam
Gelao	Kra–Dai → Kra → Gelao (Note: Many of the Gelao dialects are mutually unintelligible; they are known to intermarry with other ethnic groups; recently, these factors have resulted in most of the populations speaking only Chinese.)	China (Guizhou)		Taoism, Buddhism
Georgians	Kartvelian languages Northeast Caucasian → Nakh → Bats; Georgian Sign	Georgia, Azerbaijan (Saingilo), Turkey (Black Sea region, Marmara region, Eastern Anatolia region)	Adjarians, Bats, (Note: Although a Nakh people, they are heavily assimilated into Georgian society.) Gurians, Imeretians, Imerkhevians, Ingiloys, Javakhians, Kakhetians, Khevsurians, Meskhetians, Mingrelians (including Samurzakanians), Mokheves, Mtiuletians, Pshavs, Rachians, Svans, Tushetians, Chveneburi, with significant populations in Turkey (including Chveneburi and Imerkhevians), and Iran (including Fereydan Georgians)	Christianity → Eastern Orthodoxy → Georgian Orthodoxy
Ghorbati	Indo-European → Indo-Iranian → Persian, Ghorbati	Central Asia	Mugat Ghorbati	Islam → Shia Islam
Gilaks	Indo-European → Indo-Iranian → Gilaki	Iran (Gilan)		Islam → Twelver Shi’ism
Gonds	Dravidian → Gondi (Note: Due to their historical low status in India, the majority only speak Hindi.)	India (Gondwana)	Godha, Madia Gonds, Muria, Koya	Hinduism, Koyapunem
Gorontalo	Austronesian → Philippine → Gorontaloan; Austronesian → Malayo-Polynesian → Gorontalo Malay	Indonesia (Gorontalo)	Polahi	Islam → Sunni Islam
Great Andamanese	Great Andamanese	India (Great Andaman)		Animism
Greeks	Indo-European → Hellenic; Turkic → Common Turkic → Turkish → Karamanli Turkish, Tsalka; Cypriot Sign	Cyprus, Turkey (Cappadocia, Pontus, Istanbul), Egypt, the South Caucasus, and surrounding regions	Greek Cypriots (including Greek Northern Cypriots), Asia Minor Greeks (including Pontic Greeks (including Georgian Urums), Cappadocian Greeks (including Karamanlides), Constantinopolites, Ionian Greeks), Greek Muslims (including Vallahades, Cretan Muslims), Phanariots, Egyptian Greeks (including Alexandrian Greeks), Caucasus Greeks (including Tsalka Urums), Sfakians, along with significant populations in Turkey, Georgia, Azerbaijan, Armenia, Egypt	Christianity → Eastern Orthodoxy, Catholicism → Greek Byzantine Catholicism historically Hellenism, Neoplatonism, Greco-Roman Mysteries
Gujarati	Indo-European → Indo-Iranian → Gujarati	India (Gujarat)	Koli, Bharwad, Khoja, Patidar, Bohras (including Alavi Bohras, Dawoodi Bohra, Hebtiahs Bohra and Sunni Bohra), Lohana, Vagri, Kharva, Charan, Baria, Momna, Ghanchi, Shenva, Bhambi Khalpa, Zarabes, Bhoi, Padhar, Gujarati Americans	Hinduism, Islam (Sunni Islam and Shia Islam), Jainism
Gurjars	Indo-European → Indo-Iranian → Gujari; Dhadkai Sign Language	Pakistan, India, Afghanistan	Khatana, Solanki, Parihar, Parmar, chandel, Chauhan, Bhadana, Kohli, Tomar, Panwar, Pawar, Baisla, Bagri, Hans, Kutch Gurjar Kshatriyas, Bakarwals, Muslim Gurjars	Islam, Hinduism, Sikhism
Gurungs	Sino-Tibetan → Gurung	Nepal, India (Sikkim, West Bengal)		Buddhism → Vajrayana → Tibetan Buddhism, Bon, Hinduism
Han	Sino-Tibetan → Sinitic → Chinese; CSLic languages JSLic → Taiwan Sign; Indo-European → Germanic → English → Manglish, Singlish, Hong Kong English; Austronesian → Malayic → Bazaar Malay → Baba Malay; Austronesian → Murutic–Papar–Tatana → Tatana historically Sino-Tibetan → Chinese → Ba–Shu; Indo-European → Germanic → English → Chinese Pidgin English; Indo-European → Balto-Slavic → Russian → Kyakhta Russian–Chinese Pidgin	China, Taiwan, Singapore, Myanmar (Kokang), Malaysia	Subei, Yue (including Cantonese, Punti, Taishanese (including Taishanese Hongkongers), Hongkongers (including Punti), Macau), Tankas (including Fuzhou Tankas), Màirén, Hui (including Panthays), Fujianese (including Fuzhounese, Hoklos, Hui'an maidens, Putianese, Fujianese Hongkongers, and Teochew), Gaoshan Han, Gan, Tunbao, Pinghua (including Northern Pinghua and Southern Pinghua), Hakka (including Ngái (including Dan)), Hainanese, Hebei, Hunanese, Jianghuai, Shandong, Sichuanese, Wu (including Shanghainese, Ningbonese, and Wenzhounese), Kokang Chinese, Han Taiwanese (including Hoklo Taiwanese, Hakka Taiwanese, Waishengren), Sino-Singaporeans (including Straits Chinese), Chin Haw, Hwagyo, Zhongum), along with significant populations in Mongolia, Malaysia (including Penangite Chinese, Straits Chinese, Sino-Natives (including Tatanas), and Peranakans (including Baba-Nyonya and Kiau–Seng)), Thailand, Indonesia (including Benteng), Myanmar, the Philippines (including Sangleys), Vietnam (including Chinese Nùng and Ngai (including Dan)), Japan, Russia (including Taz), Korea (including North Korea and South Korea), India (including Zhongum), Laos, Cambodia (including Teochew, Cantonese Cambodians, Hainanese Cambodians, Hoklos, and Hakkas), Iran, Israel, Kazakhstan, Kyrgyzstan, Bangladesh, Pakistan, Sri Lanka, Turkey, the United Arab Emirates, Egypt	Chinese folk religion, Buddhism → Chinese Buddhism, Taoism, Irreligion (see also Religion in China and Religion in Taiwan)
Hani	Sino-Tibetan → Loloish → Hani	China (Yunnan)		Animism
Ḫawlan bin ʾAmir	Afroasiatic → Sayhadic → Razihi, Faifi	Yemen (Saada Governorate), Saudi Arabia (Fifa Mountains)	Razihis, Faifis	Islam → Shia Islam → Zaydism
Hazaras	Indo-European → Indo-Iranian → Hazaragi	Afghanistan (Hazarajat), Pakistan		Islam
Helong (Note: Otherwise known as Kupangese.)	Austronesian → Timoric → Helong	Indonesia (Kupang Regency, Semau, Flores)		Christianity
Hindustani	Indo-European → Indo-Iranian → Hindustani, (Note: The coherence of this language group depends on the classification being used. If there can be considered a consensus within the dialectology of Hindustani dialect continuum, it is that it can be split into two sets of dialects: Western and Eastern Hindi. Shapiro (2003), p. 276) Rajasthani, Bihari, Central Pahari	Hindustani Belt, Pakistan, Deccan, Old Dhaka	Urdu-speaking people, Hindi-speaking people, Rajasthanis, Biharis	Hinduism, Islam
Hmong	Hmong–Mien → Hmongic	China (Guizhou) (Note: Following the suppression of Miao Rebellion of 1854–1873, the majority of the Hmong fled further south to Guangxi, Yunnan, Vietnam, and Laos.)	A-Hmao, Gha-Mu, Xong, Pa-Hng	Hmong folk religion
Hruso	Sino-Tibetan → Hrusish → Hruso	India (Arunachal Pradesh)		Hinduism, Buddhism, Nyezi-No
Iban	Austronesian → Malayic → Iban	Malaysia (Sarawak)	Mualang	Christianity
Ibanag	Austronesian → Philippine → Cordilleran → Ibanag	Philippines (Isabela, Cagayan)		Christianity → Catholicism
Ibaloi	Austronesian → Malayo-Polynesaian → Ibaloi, Ilocano, Tagalog	Philippines (Cordillera Administrative Region)		Anitism
Ifugao	Austronesian → Malayo-Polynesian → Ifugao, Ilocano, Tagalog	Philippines (Cordillera Administrative Region)		Anitism
Ili Turks	Turkic → Common Turkic → Ili Turki	China (Ili Kazakh Autonomous Prefecture), Kazakhstan		Islam → Sunni Islam
Ilocano	Austronesian → Philippine → Ilocano	Philippines (Ilocos Region)		Christianity → Catholicism
Indos	Indo-European → Germanic → Dutch; Austronesian → Malayic → Indonesian–Malaysian Malay → Indonesian	Indonesia		Christianity
Indo-Hongkongers	Indo-European → Germanic → English; Sino-Tibetan → Sinitic → Cantonese	Hong Kong		Hinduism; Islam; Sikhism; Jainism
Indo-Yemenis	Afro-Asiatic → Semitic → Arabic	Yemen		Islam; Hinduism; Christianity
Indus Kohistanis	Indo-European → Indo-Iranian → Indus Kohistani	Pakistan (Kohistan)		Islam → Sunni Islam
Iranun	Austronesian → Malayo-Polynesian → Iranun	Philippines (Mindanao)		Islam → Sunni Islam
Isnag	Austronesian → Malayo-Polynesian → Isnag, Ilocano, Tagalog	Philippines (Cordillera Administrative Region)		Anitism
Itawes	Austronesian → Malayo-Polynesian → Itawis	Philippines (Cagayan Valley)		Christianity → Catholicism
Itelmens	Chukotko-Kamchatkan → Kamchatkan → Itelmen	Russia (Kamchatka Peninsula)		Shamanism
Itneg	Austronesian → Malayo-Polynesian → Itneg, Ilocano, Tagalog	Philippines (Cordillera Administrative Region)		Anitism
Ivatans	Austronesian → Malayo-Polynesian → Ivatan	Philippines (Batanes)		Christianity → Catholicism
Jadgals	Indo-European → Indo-Iranian → Jadgali	Balochistan (Pakistan, Iran), Oman	Sardarzahi, Bizenjo, Zehri, Sasoli, Mengal, Mir, Hoot	Islam → Sunni Islam
Jambian	Austronesian → Malayo-Polynesian → Jambian	Indonesia (Jambia)	Batin	Sunni Islam
Japanese/Yamato	Japonic → Japanese, (Note: Due to a lack of mutual intelligibility with other Japanese varieties, the Kagoshima/Satsugū and Tsugaru (Note: The ResearchGate mirror (archive) contains metadata about the presentation.) varieties are considered to be distinct languages from other Japanese varieties within a Japanesic language family by the Max Planck Institute for Evolutionary Anthropology within their Glottolog database.) Hachijō; JSLic → Japanese Sign; Miyakubo Sign Language	Japan	Kanto-jin, Kansai, Hokkaido, Tohoku (including the Matagi dialect of the Matagi), Hōnichi, Hichiku, Satsugū, Chūgoku, Umpaku, Echigo, Tōkai, Shinshuu, Hokuriku, Hachijō, Miyakubo, Tsugaru, and Nikkei Brazilians in Japan, along with significant populations in Russia, China (including Hong Kong), Turkey, Egypt, India, Indonesia, North Korea, South Korea, Malaysia, Nepal, Sri Lanka, Vietnam, Singapore, Thailand, the United Arab Emirates, and the Philippines.	Irreligion, Shinto, Tenrikyo, Buddhism, Animism (Matagi); (Note: The majority of the Japanese practiced a syncretised form of Shinto and Buddhism called Shinbutsu-shūgō.) Christianity → Catholicism → Kakure and Hanure Krishitanity
Jarai	Austronesian → Chamic → Jarai	Vietnam (Central Highlands)		Animism
Jarawas	Ongan → Jarawa	India (South Andaman, Middle Andaman)		Animism
Javanese	Austronesian → Javanese	Indonesia (Java)	Osing, Tenggerese, Boyanese, Banyumasan, Mataram, along with significant populations in Malaysia, Indonesians in Singapore (over 60% of Singaporean Malays are of Javanese descent), Suriname, China, Sri Lanka, French Guiana, New Caledonia, and Saudi Arabia	Islam → Sunni Islam; Sunni Islam + Hinduism + Buddhism + Animism → Kejawèn
Jews	Afroasiatic → West Semitic → Hebrew → Modern Hebrew (Note: Despite the successful revival of the Hebrew language, many Jews continue to speak the various languages that have developed by the diaspora populations, including Yiddish, Ladino, and Judeo-Arabic. In addition, English serves as the lingua franca of Israel.) Jewish languages, (Note: Though many Jewish languages are not genetically related to each other, they are all ethnolects developed by the Jewish diaspora.); DGSic → Israeli Sign	Israel (Note: While Jews originate in the Land of Israel, they were primarily a diaspora ethnicity from the late antique period until 1948, with the Jewish identity being claimed mostly by descendants of those that left Israel following the First Jewish–Roman War. Despite some entire Jewish communities migrating back to Israel, Israeli Jews make up only 45% of the worldwide Jewish population.)	Ashkenazim (including Udmurt and Tatar Jews), Assyrian Jews, Sephardim (including Eastern Sephardim, Paradesi, Meshuchrarim), Mizrahim (including Bukharim, Juhurim, Kurdim, Lakhloukh Jews, Syrian Jews, Arab Jews (including Banu al-Harith), Afghan Jews, Baghdadi Jews, Teimanim (including Rechabites, Baladi Jews, Shami Jews, and Rambamists), Sharʿabi Jews, Habbanim, Adeni Jews, Persim, Mashhadi Jews, and Kaifeng Jews), Romaniotes, Constantinopolitan Karaites, Bavlim, Gruzim, Bene Israel, Banu Israil, Kochinim, Israeli Jews, B'nai Moshe, Bnei Menashe, Desi Jews, Levites (including Kohen, Urfalim), Bene Ephraim, along with significant populations in Russia, Turkey, Azerbaijan, Georgia, Iraq, India (including Sephardim)	Judaism
Jingpo	Sino-Tibetan → Sal → Jingpho	China (Yunnan), India (Northeast India), Myanmar (Kachin State)		Animism
Jino	Sino-Tibetan → Loloish → Jino	China (Yunnan)		Animism, Buddhism
Kadazan–Dusun	Austronesian → Southwest Sabahan → Dusunic	Malaysia (Sabah)	Kadazan, Dusun, Dumpas, Ida'an, Kwijau, Lotud, Mangka'ak, Maragang, Minokok, Orang Sungai, Rumanau, Rungus, Tambanuo	Christianity, Momolianism
Kalanguya	Austronesian → Malayo-Polynesian → Kalanguya, Ilocano, Tagalog	Philippines (Cordillera Administrative Region)		Anitism
Kalash	Indo-European → Indo-Iranian → Kalasha	Pakistan (Chitral District)		Kalasha
Kalinka	Austronesian → Malayo-Polynesian → Kalinga, Ilocano, Tagalog	Philippines (Cordillera Administrative Region)		Anitism
Kalmyks	Mongolic → Central Mongolic → Oirat → Sart Kalmyk	Kyrgyzstan (Issyk-Kul Region)	Sart Kalmyks	Buddhism → Tibetan Buddhism
Kangeanese	Austronesian → Malayo-Polyesian → Kangeanese	Indonesia (Kangean Islands)	Kangean, Paliat, Sepanjang, Sabunten, Saobi	Islam → Sunni Islam
Kankanaey	Austronesian → Malayo-Polynesian → Kankanaey, Ilocano, Tagalog	Philippines (Cordillera Administrative Region)		Anitism
Kannadigas	Dravidian → South Dravidian → Kannada	India (Karnataka)	Vokkaliga	Hinduism, Jainism
Kapampangans	Austronesian → Malayo-Polynesian → Kapampangan	Philippines (Pampanga)		Christianity → Catholicism, Iglesia ni Cristo, Anitism
Karakalpaks	Turkic → Common Turkic → Karakalpak	Uzbekistan (Karakalpakstan)	Qon'ırat, On To'rt Urıw	Islam → Sunni Islam
Karbi	Sino-Tibetan → Kuki-Chin–Naga → Karbic	India (Assam, Meghalaya)	Hills Karbi, Amri Karbi	Hinduism, Animism, Christianity
Karen	Sino-Tibetan → Karenic	Myanmar (Karen State, Kayah State, Pa'O Self-Administered Zone), Thailand	S'gaw Karen, Pwo Karen, Karenni (including Kayan), Pa'O	Buddhism → Theravada Buddhism
Kashmiris	Indo-European → Indo-Iranian → Kashmiri	Kashmir (India, Pakistan)	Kashmiri Hindus (including Kashmiri Pandits), Punjabi Kashmiris	Islam → Sunni Islam, Hinduism, Sikhism
Kazakhs	Turkic → Common Turkic → Kazakh; Francosign → RSLic → Russian Sign → Kazakh Sign	Kazakhstan	Uly juz, Orta juz, Kishi juz. Significant populations in China, Iran, and Russia	Islam → Sunni Islam
Kemak	Austronesian → Timoric → Kemak	Timor (West Timor Timor-Leste)		Folk religion, Christianity
Kenaboi	Kenaboi	Malaysia (Negeri Sembilan (Jelebu District))		Animism
Kereks	Chukotko-Kamchatkan → Chukotkan → Kerek	Russia (Chukotka)		Shamanism
Kerinci	Austronesian → Malayo-Polynesian → Kerinci	Indonesia (Kerincia)		Sunni Islam
Ket	Yeniseian → Northern Yeniseian → Ket	Russia (Krasnoyarsk Krai)		Shamanism
Khakas	Turkic → Common Turkic → Khakas	Russia (Khakassia)		Christianity → Eastern Orthodoxy → Russian Orthodoxy; Shamanism → Tengrism
Khalaj	Turkic → Common Turkic → Khalaj	Iran		Islam → Shia Islam
Khanty	Uralic → Khanty	Russia (Khanty-Mansi Autonomous Okrug)		Christianity → Eastern Orthodoxy → Russian Orthodoxy, Shamanism → Bear worship
Khas	Indo-European → Indo-Iranian → Nepali	Nepal and India (Uttarakhand, Sikkim, Assam, West Bengal)	Chhetri, Thakuri, Rana, Vaisya, Kami, Damai, Sarki, Sunar, Gandarbha	Hinduism
Khasi	Austroasiatic → Khasi–Palaungic → Khasic	India (Meghalaya)	Pnar	Christianity
Khatso	Sino-Tibetan → Tibeto-Burman → Katso	China (Tonghai County)		Buddhism → Tibetan Buddhism
Khmer	Austroasiatic → Khmer	Cambodia, Vietnam (Southeast region, Mekong Delta region), Thailand (Eastern Thailand, Isan), Laos (Champasak province)	Northern Khmer people, Khmer Krom, Cardamom Khmers, Khmer Khe	Buddhism → Theravada Buddhism
Khonds	Dravidian → Kui	India (Kandhamal)		Hinduism
Khorasani Turks	Turkic → Common Turkic → Khorasani Turkic	Iran (Khorasan), Turkmenistan		Islam → Shia Islam
Kirantis	Sino-Tibetan → Kiranti	Nepal (Eastern Region)	Limbu, Sunuwar, Yakkha (including Athpare), Rai (including Kulung, Bantawa, and Bahing)	Kirat Mundhum
Koches	Sino-Tibetan → Sal → Koch	India (Assam, Meghalaya), northern Bangladesh		Animism
Kodava	Dravidian → Tamil–Kodava–Urali → Kodava	India (Kodagu, Bangalore, Mysore)		Hinduism
Konkani	Indo-European → Indo-Iranian → Konkani	India (Goa, Konkan, Karnataka)	Goan Catholics, Mangalorean Catholics	Hinduism; Christianity → Catholicism
Koreans	Koreanic languages JSLic → Korean Sign	Korea (North Korea, South Korea), China (Jilin, Xi'an District)	North Koreans (including in South Korea), South Koreans, Jeju Islanders, Koryo-saram, Sakhalin Koreans, Zainichi Koreans, Chaoxianzu (including in Japan and Korea) and along with significant populations in Russia (including North Koreans, Koryo-saram, and Sakhalin Koreans), China, Japan (including Zainichi Koreans and Chaoxianzu), Vietnam, Thailand, Singapore, the Philippines, Indonesia, Mongolia, Iran, Nepal, Taiwan, Sri Lanka, India, the Arab world	Christianity (Note: Largest practiced religion; the majority/plurality of this group are actually non-religious.) → Protestantism, Catholicism; Buddhism → Mahayana Buddhism → Korean Buddhism; Korean shamanism, Cheondoism, Unification Church, Juche
Koryaks	Chukotko-Kamchatkan → Chukotkan → Koryak	Russia (Koryak Okrug)		Christianity → Eastern Orthodoxy, Shamanism
Kristang	Indo-European → Portuguese-based creole → Kristang	Malaysia, Singapore		Christianity → Catholicism
Kryts	Northeast Caucasian → Lezgic → Kryts	Azerbaijan		Islam → Sunnism
Kumandins	Turkic → Common Turkic → Northern Altai → Kumandy	Russia (Altai Krai, Altai Republic)		Christianity → Eastern Orthodoxy → Russian Orthodoxy
Kumaonis	Indo-European → Indo-Iranian → Kumaoni	India (Uttarakhand (Kumaon)), Nepal (Doti)	Johari, Askoti, Bhabhri, Danpuriya, Gangoli, Khasparjiya, Kumaiyya, Pachhai, Phaldakotiya, Rhau-Chaubyansi, Sirali, Soriyali	Hinduism, Buddhism
Kumzari	Indo-European → Indo-Iranian → Kumzari	Oman (Kumzar)		Islam → Ibadism, Sunnism
Kurds	Indo-European → Indo-Iranian → Kurdish, Zaza–Gorani; Turkic → Common Turkic → Khorasani Turkic; Kurdish Sign	Kurdistan (Iraq, Iran, Syria, Turkey), South Caucasus (Armenia, Azerbaijan, Georgia)	Bajalan, Zazas, Feylis, Laks, Mhallami, Chechen Kurds, Yazidis, Yarsanis, Kurdish Christians, Shabaks, Sheylanli, Chalabianlu, Muzuri, Caucasian Kurds, Khorasani Kurds along with significant populations in Iraq (including Yazidis), Iran, Syria (including Yazidis), Turkey (including Yazidis), Armenia (including Yazidis), Georgia (including Yazidis), Azerbaijan, Palestine, Kazakhstan	Islam → Sunni Islam → Sufism → Naqshbandi, Qadiriyya; Islam → Alevism → Kurdish Alevism; Yazidism, Yarsanism, Zoroastrianism; Historically Shabakism
Kurukh	Dravidian → North Dravidian → Kurukh; Indo-European → Indo-Iranian → Oraon Sadri	India (Chota Nagpur Plateau)	Kisan	Sarnaism, Christianity, Hinduism
Kusunda	Kusunda	Nepal (Gandaki Province, Lumbini Province)		Animism, Hinduism, Buddhism
Kyrgyz	Turkic → Common Turkic → Kyrgyz; Turkic → Common Turkic → Uyghur → Akto; Mongolic → Central Mongolic → Oirat → Sart Kalmyk; Francosign → RSLic → Russian Sign	Kyrgyzstan, China (Xinjiang), Uzbekistan, Pakistan (Broghil Valley, Gojal Tehsil), Afghanistan (Wakhan District)	Sart Kalmyks, Kyrgyzstani Kyrgyz, Uzbekistani Kyrgyz, Pamir Kyrgyz (including Pakistani Kyrgyz and Afghan Kyrgyz), Chinese Kyrgyz (including Akto Turkmen), significant populations in Turkey	Islam → Sunni Islam → Hanafi, Tengrism
Ladakhis	Sino-Tibetan → Tibetic → Ladakhi	India (Ladakh), China (Tibet), Pakistan (Baltistan)		Buddhism → Tibetan Buddhism, Islam → Shia Islam, Hinduism
Lamaholot	Austronesian → Flores–Lembata → Lamaholot	Indonesia (Solor)		Christianity → Catholicism
Lampungs	Austronesian → Malayo-Polynesian → Lampung	Indonesia (Lampung)		Islam
Lao	Kra–Dai → Tai → Lao, Isan	Laos, Thailand (Isan)	Isan, Lao Ga, Lao Krang, Lao Lom, Lao Loum, Lao Ngaew, Lao Song, Lao Ti, Lao Wiang	Buddhism → Theravada Buddhism, Satsana Phi
Laz	Kartvelian → Zan → Laz (Note: Due to both Turkification and the tendency among Georgia-residing Laz to see themselves as being a Georgian subgroup, the majority of Laz either speak Turkish or Georgian.)	Lazistan (Turkey, Georgia)	Turkish Laz, Georgian Laz	Islam → Sunnism
Lepchas	Sino-Tibetan → Tibeto-Burman → Lepcha	India (Sikkim, West Bengal), Nepal, Bhutan, China (Tibet)		Buddhism, Mun, Christianity
Lezgins	Northeast Caucasian → Lezgic → Lezgian	Lezgistan (Azerbaijan)	Azerbaijani Lezgins	Islam → Sunni Islam
Lhoba	Sino-Tibetan → Adi, Bokar, Idu Mishmi (Note: The Lhoba speak a variety of Sino-Tibetan languages, all of which may or may not be mutually intelligible.)	China (Tibet), India (Arunachal Pradesh)	Nishi, Na, Galo, Mishmi people, Tagin, Adi	Animism, Buddhism, Christianity
Lhotshampa	Indo-European → Indo-Iranian → Nepali	Bhutan		Hinduism, Buddhism
Li	Kra–Dai → Hlai	China (Hainan)		Islam → Sunnism
Lisu	Sino-Tibetan → Loloish → Lisu	China, Myanmar	Lipo	Christianity → Protestantism → Lisu Christianity
Lodha	Austroasiatic → Munda → Lodhi	India (Jharkhand, Odisha, West Bengal)	Lodha Muslims	Hinduism, Islam
Lom	Indo-European → Armenian and Indo-Iranian → Lomavren; Indo-European → Armenian	Armenia, Georgia, Turkey		Christianity → Oriental Orthodoxy
Lori	Indo-European → Indo-Iranian → Balochi; Indo-European → Indo-Iranian → Saraiki	Balochistan (India, Pakistan)		Islam
Lubu	Austronesian → Malayic → Lubu	Indonesia (Sumatra)		Islam
Lurs	Indo-European → Indo-Iranian → Luri	Iran (Lorestan, Kohgiluyeh and Boyer-Ahmad, Khuzestan, Bushehr, and Chaharmahal and Bakhtiari Provinces)	Bakhtiari, Laks	Islam → Shia Islam, Yarsanism
Luso-Indians	Indo-European → Portuguese-based creole → Daman and Diu Portuguese Creole, Korlai Portuguese Creole, Cochin Portuguese Creole; Indo-European → Indo-Iranian → Konkani, Gujarati; Indo-European → Germanic → English	India (Goa, Gujarat, Mumbai, Vasai, Daman, Diu & Silvassa, Kerala, Tamil Nadu, Kolkata, Andhra Pradesh, Karnataka)		Christianity → Catholicism; Hinduism
Macanese	Indo-European → Romance → Portuguese → Macanese Patois, Sino-Tibetan → Sinitic → Cantonese	China (Macau)		Christianity → Catholicism
Madurese	Austronesian → Malayo-Polyesian → Madurese	Indonesia (Madura) (Note: Due to poor soil condition in Madura, the majority now live on Java.)	Boyanese	Islam → Sunni Islam → Shafi'i
Magahi	Indo-European → Indo-Iranian → Magahi	India (Magadha)		Hinduism
Magars	Sino-Tibetan → Mahakiranti → Magaric (Note: The majority of the Magars have recently switched to Nepali.); Sino-Tibetan → Tibeto-Kanauri → Kaike	Nepal, India, Bhutan	Various Magar clans Kham Magars, Kaike Magars	Hinduism, Buddhism
Maguindanao	Austronesian → Philippine → Maguindanao	Philippines (Maguindanao)		Islam
Maithils	Indo-European → Indo-Iranian → Maithili	Mithila (India, Nepal)	Maithil Brahmins	Hinduism
Makassarese	Austronesian → South Sulawesi → Makassarese	Indonesia (South Sulawesi)		Islam → Sunni Islam
Malasar	Dravidian → Tamiloid → Malasar	India (Karnataka, Kerala, Tamil Nadu)		Hinduism
Malayalis (Note: Otherwise known as Keralites or Keralans.)	Dravidian → Malayalamoid → Malayalam	India (Kerala, Lakshadweep)	Ambalavasi, Dheevara, Nair, Paravar, Ezhava, Malabar Latin Catholics, Saint Thomas Christians (including Northists and Knanayas), Malabar Muslims (including Mappilas, Thangals, Baramis, Themims, Pusalars, Ossans, Koyas) along with significant populations in the Arab states of the Persian Gulf	Hinduism, Islam, Christianity
Malayarayans	Dravidian → Malayalamoid → Malaryan	India (Kerala, Tamil Nadu)		Hinduism
Malays	Austronesian → Malayic → Malaysian–Indonesian Malay, Brunei Malay, Jambi Malay, Pahang Malay, Terengganu Malay, Kelantan-Pattani Malay, Kedah Malay, Reman Malay; Francosign → ASLic → Malaysian Sign; Austronesian → Malay Creole → Sri Lanka Malay	Malay world (Malaysia, Singapore, Indonesia, Brunei)	Kedahans, Pattani, Pahang, Pontianaks, Terengganuarians, Kelantanese, Perakians, Berau, Loloan Malays, Proto-Malay (including Orang Kuala, Jakun, Orang Rimba, Orang Seletar, and Temuan) Cape Malays, Cocos Malays, Bangka Malays, Thai Malays, Burmese Malays, Sri Lanka Malays, Bruneians	Islam → Sunnism
Maldivians	Indo-European → Indo-Iranian → Maldivian	Maldives, India (Minicoy)	Mahls	Islam → Sunnism
Mambai	Austronesian → Timoric → Mambai	East Timor (Dili District)		Christianity → Catholicism
Manchus	Tungusic → Southern Tungusic → Manchu (Note: The majority of the Tungusic languages are endangered, and many Tungusic ethnic groups now mostly speak only Russian or Chinese depending on the location of their homeland.)	Russia (Outer Manchuria), China (Inner Manchuria, Weichang, Fengning, Kuancheng, Qinglong-Manchuria)	Significant populations in Taiwan	Shamanism
Mandaeans	Afroasiatic → West Semitic → Mandaic	Iraq (Dhi Qar Governorate, Maysan Governorate, Wasit Governorate, Basra Governorate, Baghdad Governorate), Iran (Khuzestan)		Mandaeism
Mandarese	Austronesian → South Sulawesi → Mandar	Indonesia (West Sulawesi)		Islam
Manggarai	Austronesian → Sumba–Flores → Manggarai	Indonesia (Manggarai)		Christianity
Mannan	Dravidian → Tamiloid → Mannan	India (Idukki district)		Hinduism
Mansi	Uralic → Mansi	Russia (Khanty-Mansi Autonomous Okrug)		Christianity → Eastern Orthodoxy → Russian Orthodoxy; Shamanism → Bear worship
Maranao	Austronesian → Philippine → Maranao	Philippines (Lanao)		Islam
Marathi	Indo-European → Indo-Iranian → Marathi	India (Maharashtra)	Mahar, Maratha, Kunbi, Dhangar, Bhoi, East Indian Catholics	Hinduism, Jainism, Christianity → Catholicism, Buddhism → Navayana Buddhism,
Mardijkers	Austronesian → Malayic → Betawi, Malay → Indonesian; Indo-European → Romance → Portuguese → Mardijker Creole	Indonesia (Jakarta)		Christianity
Maronites	Afroasiatic → West Semitic → Lebanese Aramaic, (Note: Most Maronites today speak Arabic since a language shift around the 17th century with Syriac in liturgical use, however some Maronites in Jish are reviving Aramaic.) Cypriot Arabic, Levantine Arabic	Levant, Cyprus	Significant populations in Syria, Lebanon, Cyprus and Israel along with the greater Lebanese diaspora	Christianity → Maronite Catholicism
Mazandaranis	Indo-European → Indo-Iranian → Mazanderani	Iran (Mazandaran)		Islam → Shi'ism
Mehri	Afroasiatic → West Semitic → Mehri	Oman (Dhofar), Yemen (Al Mahrah Governorate, Socotra)		Islam
Meitei	Sino-Tibetan → Kuki-Chin–Naga → Meitei	India (Manipur)	Loi	Hinduism → Vaishnavism
Melanau	Austronesian → Melanau–Kajang → Melanau	Malaysia (Sarawak)		Islam
Mien	Hmong–Mien → Mienic; Sino-Tibetan → Sinitic → Dong, Yuebei Tuhua, Jianghua Tuhua	China (Hunan, Guizhou), Vietnam	Iu Mien, Kim Mun, Dzao Min, Biao Min, Bunu, Lakkia, Biao Mon, San Diu	Yao folk religion
Minahasan	Austronesian → Philippine → Minahasan; Austronesian → Malay Creole → Manado Malay	Indonesia (Minahasa Peninsula)	Tonsawang, Tontemboan, Tondano, Tombulu, Tonsea	Christianity → Protestantism
Minangkabau	Austronesian → Malayic → Minangkabau, → Negeri Sembilan Malay	Indonesia (Minangkabau Highlands), Malaysia (Negeri Sembilan)		Islam → Sunnism
Mising	Sino-Tibetan → Tani → Mising	India (Assam, Arunachal Pradesh)		Donyi-Polo, Ekasarana Dharma
Mlabri	Austroasiatic → Khmuic → Mlabri	Laos, Thailand		Christianity, Animism
Moghols	Indo-European → Indo-Iranian → Dari; Historically Mongolic → Moghol	Afghanistan	Nikudari	Islam → Sunnism
Moken	Austronesian → Moken	Thailand, Myanmar (Mergui Archipelago, Surin Islands)		Buddhism
Mon	Austroasiatic → Monic → Mon	Myanmar (Mon State)		Buddhism → Theravada Buddhism
Mongols	Mongolic languages Sino-Tibetan → Lolo-Burmese → Katso; Sino-Tibetan → Naic → Laze; Francosign → Austro-Hungarian Sign → Mongolian Sign; Historically Turkic → Common Turkic → Uyghur → Khoton; Tungusic → Ewenic → Khamnigan Evenki	China (Inner Mongolia, Dorbetia, Bayingolin, Dzungaria, Subei-Mongolia, Santania, Kharchinia, Henan, Bortala, Hoboksar, Haixi, Qianguo, Fuxin, Weichang, Yunnan, Sichuan), Mongolia, Russia (Zabaykalsky Krai)	Khalkha (including Khotogoids, Eljigin), Oirats (including Manchurian Öelets, Dörbets, Zakhchins, Bayads, Olots, Altai Uriankhais), Hamnigan, Tsagaan, Khatso, Bonan, Sichuan Mongols, Sogwo Arig, Ordos, Darkhad, Kanja, Sogwo Arig, Mughals, Santa, Naimans, Dariganga, Khorchin, Kharchin, Koke Nuur, Chaharian, Jalairs, Gorlos, Sartuul, Myangad, Tubalar, Uzemchin, Uradian, Tumed, Baarins, Hishigten, Muumyangan, Jalaids, Abaganar, Chantuu, Sunud, Shar Darkhads, Eastern Dorbet, Aohans, Onnigud, Khoshut, Abagas, Khotons, Alasha, Khoid, Choros, Asud, with significant populations in India, South Korea, Japan, Taiwan	Buddhism → Tibetan Buddhism, Tengrism
Mongondow	Austronesian → Philippine → Mongondow	Indonesia (Mongondowia)		Islam → Sunnism
Monguour	Mongolic → Shirongol → Monguor	China (Qinghai, Gansu)		Buddhism → Tibetan Buddhism, Tengrism
Monpa	Sino-Tibetan → East Bodish	India (Arunachal Pradesh)		Buddhism → Vajrayana Buddhism
Mosuo	Sino-Tibetan → Naish → Na	China (Sichuan and Yunnan)		Daba, Buddhism → Tibetan Buddhism
Mughals	Indo-European → Indo-Iranian → Hindustani; Historically Indo-European → Indo-Iranian → Persian	India, Pakistan, Bangladesh		Islam
Muhajir	Indo-European → Indo-Iranian → Urdu, Gujarati, etc	Pakistan		Islam → Sunnism
Munanese	Austronesian → Celebic → Munanese	Indonesia (Muna Island)		Islam
Mundas	Austroasiatic → Munda → Mundari	India (Jharkhand, Odisha, West Bengal)	Sabar, Mahali	Sarnaism
Murut	Austronesian → Southwest Sabahan → Murutic	Malaysia (Murutia)	Okolod, Keningau, Tagal, Paluan, Selungai, Timugon, Serudung, Sembakung, Tidong, Kalabakan, Bulungan, Bookan	Christianity → Catholicism
Muthuvans	Dravidian → Tamiloid → Muthuvan	India (Kerala, Tamil Nadu)		Hinduism
Nagas	Sino-Tibetan → Kuki-Chin–Naga (Note: The Kuki-Chin–Naga language grouping (it is unclear whether the Kuki-Chin–Naga form an actual language family) consists of five to eight branches. Except for Karbi and Meitei, the Kuki-Chin–Naga is divided between the Chin and the Naga. The Mruic and most of the Kuki-Chin speakers are seen as Chin, while speakers of the remaining Kuki-Chin–Naga branches (Ao, Angami–Pochuri, Tangkhulic, and Zeme) and the speakers Northwestern Kuki-Chin are seen as Naga.); Historically Angami Naga Sign	India (Nagaland, Manipur, Arunachal Pradesh, Assam), Myanmar (Naga Self-Administered Zone)	Anal Angami, Ao, Chakhesang (including Chokri and Khezha), Chang, Khiamniungan, Konyak, Lotha, Mao, Maram, Maring, Nocte, Phom, Pochury, Poumai, Rengma, Sangtam, Sumi, Tangkhul, Tangsa, Tikhir, Wancho, Yimkhiung, Zeliangrong (Zemi, Liangmei, Rongmei/Kabui), Lamkang Naga	Christianity → Protestantism → Baptism
Nagpuria	Indo-European → Indo-Iranian → Nagpuri	India (Chota Nagpur Plateau)	Chik Baraik	Hinduism
Nanai	Tungusic → Nanaic → Nanai; Tungusic → Ewenic → Kili; Tungusic → Udegheic → Kilen	Russia, China		Shamanism, Buddhism → Tibetan Buddhism
Nashya Shaikh	Indo-European → Indo-Iranian → Kamtapuri	India (Assam, West Bengal, Bihar), Bangladesh		Islam
Negidals	Tungusic → Northern Tungusic → Negidal	Russia (Khabarovsk Krai)		Shamanism
Nenets	Uralic → Samoyedic → Nenets	Nenets Autonomous Okrug, Yamalo-Nenets Autonomous Okrug	Forest Nenets, Tundra Nenets	Shamanism, Animism
Newars	Sino-Tibetan → Newar	Nepal (Kathmandu Valley)	Rajupadhaya, Rajbhandari, Pradhan, Malla, Shrestha, Shakya, Chitrakar	Hinduism; Buddhism → Vajrayana → Newar Buddhism
Ngaju	Austronesian → Barito → Ngaju	Indonesia (Central Kalimantan)	Bakumpai, Meratus	Kaharingan
Ngalop	Sino-Tibetan → Tibetic → Dzongkha	Bhutan	Kheng, Bumthang	Buddhism → Tibetan Buddhism, Bon
Nganasans	Uralic → Samoyedic → Nganasan; historically Indo-European → Balto-Slavic → Russian → Taimyr Pidgin Russian	Russia (Taymyr Autonomous Okrug)		Animism, Shamanism, Christianity → Eastern Orthodoxy
Nias	Austronesian → Northwest Sumatra–Barrier Islands → Nias	Indonesia (Nias)		Christianity
Nicobarese	Austroasiatic → Nicobarese	India (Nicobar Islands)		Christianity, Animism
Nihali	Nihali	India (Maharashtra)		Animism
Nivkhs	Nivkh languages	Russia (Khabarovsk Krai, Sakhalin Oblast)		Shamanism
Nùng	Kra–Dai → Tai → Nùng	Vietnam, China (Guangxi)		Moism
Nuristanis	Indo-European → Indo-Iranian → Nuristani	Afghanistan (Nuristan)	Safed-Posh Kaffirs (including Askunis), Kamkata-viris (including Kata and Kom)	Islam → Sunnism
Nyishi	Sino-Tibetan → Tani → Nishi	India (Arunachal Pradesh)		Christianity
Odia	Indo-European → Indo-Iranian → Odia	India (Odisha)	Utkala Brahmins, Khandayat, Bonaz, Badu; Bairagi (Oriya); Barika; Chaikwa; Chatarkheya; Dhobi, Oriya; Ganrar; Ghantarghada; Girigiria; Gond (Oriya); Haddi; Jhodia; Kobari; Koraga; Kuliya; Lohar, Oriya; Mali, Oriya; Malia; Panka (Oriya); Paroja; Patra; Radhi; Sannyasi; Teli, Oriya; Thanapati; Thoria	Hinduism
Onge	Ongan → Onge	India (Little Andaman Island)		Animism
Orang Darat	Austronesian → Malayo-Polynesian → Old Malay	Indonesia (Riau Islands)		Islam → Sunni Islam
Orang Laut	Austronesian → Malayic	Malaysia (Malay Peninsula), Indonesia (Riau Archipelago), Singapore (Note: This ethnic group is largely a nomadic or semi-nomadic one and do not have a particular area to claim as a primary homeland; these countries are listed here due to having a significant population.)	Loncong, Orang Seletar	Animism, Folk religion, Islam → Sunnism
Ormurs	Indo-European → Indo-Iranian → Ormuri	Afghanistan (Logar Province), Pakistan (South Waziristan)		Islam
Orochs	Tungusic → Udegheic → Oroch	Russia (Khabarovsk Krai, Magadan Oblast, Sakhalin Oblast, Primorsky Krai)		Shamanism, Christianity → Eastern Orthodoxy
Oroks (Note: Sometimes known as Ulita.)	Tungusic → Nanaic → Orok	Russia (Sakhalin Oblast), Japan	Karafuto Oroks (Note: Resettled in Hokkaido after 1945.)	Christianity → Eastern Orthodoxy → Russian Orthodoxy, Shamanism
Oroqens	Tungusic → Ewenic → Oroqen	China (Heilongjiang, Inner Mongolia)		Shamanism, Buddhism → Tibetan Buddhism
Ossetians	Indo-European → Indo-Iranian → Ossetian	Georgia (South Ossetia)	Iron, Digor, Kudar, Trialeti Ossetians	Christianity → Eastern Orthodoxy
Ot Danum	Austronesian → Greater Barito → Ot Danum	Indonesia (West and Central Kalimantan)	Lawangan, Ma'anyan	Kaharingan
Palembangese	Austronesian → Malayic → Palembang	Indonesia (South Sumatra)		Islam → Sunni Islam
Palula	Indo-European → Indo-Iranian → Palula	Pakistan (Chitral District)	Ashreti, Biori	Islam → Sunni Islam
Pamiris	Indo-European → Indo-Iranian → Pamir	Pamir Mountains (Tajikistan, Afghanistan, China)	Shughni, Sarikoli (including Tajiks of Xinjiang), Yazghulami, Munji, Yidgha, Sanglechi, Ishkashimi	Islam → Shia Islam → Isma'ilism
Pangasinese	Austronesian → Philippine → Pangasinan	Philippines (Pangasinan)		Christianity → Catholicism
Parachis	Indo-European → Indo-Iranian → Parachi	Afghanistan (Nijrab District, Kabul)		Islam
Parsis	Indo-European → Indo-Iranian → Gujaratic → Gujarati	Indian subcontinent (India, Pakistan)		Zoroastrianism
Parya	Indo-European → Indo-Iranian → Parya	Tajikistan, Uzbekistan		Islam → Sunni Islam
Pashayi	Indo-European → Indo-Iranian → Pashayi	Afghanistan (Laghman, Kapisa and Nangarhar Provinces)		Islam → Sunni Islam, Shia Islam → Isma'ilism → Nizari Isma'ilism
Pashtuns	Indo-European → Indo-Iranian → Pashto	Pashtunistan (Afghanistan, Pakistan), Iran (Khorasan, Mazandaran), India	Kakar, Ghilji (including Lodi (including Niazi, Hotak (including Babai), and Lohani (including Marwat))), Popalzai (including Sudhan), Punjabi Pathans (including Malerkotla Pathans and Multani Pathans), Tareen, Bettani (including Shirani), Afridi, Sarbani, Bangash, Karlani, Rohilla, and other Pashtun tribes, with significant populations in India, Kashmir, Sri Lanka	Islam → Sunni Islam → Hanafi; Sikhism
Persians	Indo-European → Indo-Iranian → Persian; Iranian Sign Language, Afghan Sign Language	Iran, Afghanistan, India	Farsiwan, Iranis, Sistanis (including Khorasani Sistanis and Golestani Sistanis), Dezfulis, Shushtaris, along with significant populations in the United Arab Emirates, Bahrain, Kuwait, Iraq, Qatar, Japan, China, Pakistan	Islam → Shia Islam → Twelver Shi'ism, Ni'matullāhī, Safaviyya; Zoroastrianism, Baháʼí Faith
Peshawaris	Indo-European → Indo-Iranian → Hindko → Peshori	Pakistan (Peshawar)		
Portuguese Burghers	Indo-European → Romance → Portuguese → Sri Lankan Portuguese Creole	Sri Lanka		Christianity → Catholicism
Punjabis	Indo-European → Indo-Iranian → Punjabi	Punjab (Pakistan, India)	Arain, Awan, Jat, Bhatti, Khatris, Punjabi Rajputs, Sikhs (including Jat Sikhs), Chibhālīs, along with the Punjabi diaspora	Islam → Sunnism; Hinduism, Sikhism, Ravidassia
Purigpa	Sino-Tibetan → Tibetic → Purgi	India (Ladakh), Pakistan (Gilgit-Baltistan)		Islam → Shi'ism
Puroik	Sino-Tibetan → Kho-Bwa → Puroik	India (Arunachal Pradesh)		Animism, Hinduism, Christianity
Qara Tatars	Indo-European → Indo-Iranian → Persian, Balochi	Iran (Kerman province)		Islam → Shi'ism
Qashqai	Turkic → Common Turkic → Qashqai	Iran (Fars province)		Islam → Shi'ism
Qiang	Sino-Tibetan → Qiangic	China (Ngawa Tibetan and Qiang Autonomous Prefecture)		Qiang folk religion
Qureshi	Indo-European → Indo-Iranian → Kundal Shahi	Pakistan (Kundal Shahi)		Islam → Sunnism → Barelvi
Rabari	Indo-European → Indo-Iranian → Gujarati, Sindhi → Kutchi	India (Kutch)		Hinduism
Rade	Austronesian → Chamic → Rade	Central Highlands, Vietnam		Christianity
Rajasthanis	Indo-European → Indo-Iranian → Rajasthani	India (Rajasthan)	Charan, Kachhi, Marwari, Meena, Rajputs (including Chandels, Mahyavanshi, and Molesalam)	Hinduism, Jainism, Sikhism
Rajbanshi	Indo-European → Indo-Iranian → Kamtapuri	India (Assam, West Bengal), Bangladesh		Hinduism
Rakhine	Sino-Tibetan → Burmese → Arakanese	Myanmar (Rakhine State)	Marma	Buddhism → Theravada Buddhism
Raute	Sino-Tibetan → Raji-Raute → Raute	Nepal		
Rejangese	Austronesian → Malayo-Polynesian → Rejang	Indonesia (Rejang Lebong Regency)		Islam → Sunnism
Relli	Indo-European → Indo-Iranian → Reli, Hindi	India (Andhra Pradesh, Chhattisgarh, Odisha, West Bengal)		Hinduism
Rohingyas	Indo-European → Indo-Iranian → Rohingya	Myanmar (Rakhine State)		Islam
Rotenese	Austronesian → Timoric → Rotenese	Indonesia (Rote Island)	Dela, Oenale	Christianity
Russians	Indo-European → Balto-Slavic → Russian; Francosign → Russian Sign	Russia and surrounding regions	Siberians, Cossacks (including Nekrasov Cossacks), Subbotniks, Old Believers (including Kamenschiks, Lipovans, Semeiskie), Karyms, Gurans, Doukhobors, Goryuns, Kamchadals, Molokans (including Subbotnik Molokans), Starozhily, along with significant populations in Azerbaijan, China (including Hong Kong), Israel, Kazakhstan, Kyrgyzstan, Taiwan, Turkmenistan, Armenia (including Molokans), Uzbekistan	Christianity → Spiritual Christianity, Eastern Orthodoxy → Russian Orthodoxy, Old Believerism and Old Ritualism; Christianity and Animism → Eastern Orthodoxy and Animism → Pomor Christianity
Rutuls	Northeast Caucasian → Lezgic → Rutul	Azerbaijan (Shaki District)		Islam → Sunni Islam
Ryukyuans	Japonic → Ryukyuan (Note: All Ryukyuan speakers are seen as one ethnicity; however, due to a history of forced assimilation by the Japanese government, the majority can only speak Japanese.); Japonic → Japanese → Okinawan Japanese, Amami Japanese; JSLic → Japanese Sign; Koniya Sign Language	Japan (Ryukyu Islands)	Amami (including Kikai, Amami Ōshima (including Setouchi), Tokunoshima, Okinoerabu, and Yoron), Okinawans (including Kunigami) Miyakoans, Tarama, Yaeyama, Yonaguni	Irreligion; Ryukyuan religion; Christianity → Catholicism → Ryukyuan Catholicism
Sakizaya	Austronesian → East Formosan → Sakizaya	Taiwan (Hualien County)		Animism, Christianity
Salar	Turkic → Common Turkic → Salar	China (Qinghai, Gansu)		Islam → Sunnism
Sama–Bajau	Austronesian → Barito → Sama–Bajaw	Maritime Southeast Asia (Philippines, Malaysia, Indonesia, Brunei)	Sama (including Banguingui), Bajaw, Abaknon	Islam → Sunnism
Samaritans	Afroasiatic → West Semitic → Hebrew → Modern Hebrew; Afroasiatic → West Semitic → Levantine Arabic → Palestinian Arabic; Historically Afroasiatic → West Semitic → Samaritan Hebrew, Samaritan Aramaic	Israel, Palestine		Samaritanism
Sambal	Austronesian → Philippine → Sambalic	Philippines (Zambales)	Bolinao, Botolan (including Banguingui)	Christianity → Catholicism
Sangirese	Austronesian → Philippine → Sangirese	Indonesia (Sangihe Islands), Philippines (Mindanao)		Christianity → Protestantism
Sankethi Brahmin	Dravidian → Southern Dravidian → Tamil or Kannada? → Sankethi	India (Karnataka)		Hinduism → Advaita Vedanta
Santal	Austroasiatic → Munda → Santali	India (West Bengal, Jharkhand, Odisha) (Note: Non-contiguous homeland. Throughout most of its history (if not its entire history), this ethnic group has lived in separate, isolated communities scattered throughout the countries/subdivisions listed.)	Deswali Majhi	Christianity → Catholicism
Saraiki	Indo-European → Indo-Iranian → Saraiki	Pakistan (Saraikistan, Derajat)	Khakwani, Derawali, Waiha	Islam
Sasak	Austronesian → Malayo-Polynesian → Sasak	Indonesia (Lombok)		Islam
Saurashtras	Indo-European → Indo-Iranian → Saurashtra	India (South India)		Hinduism → Vaishnavism, Hinduism → Shaivism
Savu	Austronesian → Malayo-Polynesian → Hawu	Indonesia (Savu)		Christianity → Protestantism
Seediq	Austronesian → Atayalic → Seediq	Taiwan (Nantou and Hualien Counties)	Tkdaya, Toda	Christianity, Animism
Selkups	Uralic → Samoyedic → Selkup	Russia (Tomsk Oblast, Krasnoyarsk Krai, Tyumen Oblast)		Shamanism, Christianity → Eastern Orthodoxy
Semnanis	Indo-European → Indo-Iranian → Semnani	Iran (Semnan)	Biyabunakis, Sangsaris, Sorkheis, Aftaris, Lasgerdis	Islam → Shi'ism → Twelver Shi'ism
Sentinelese	Sentinelese	India (North Sentinel Island)		Animism
Shan	Kra–Dai → Tai → Shan	Myanmar (Shan State)		Buddhism → Theravada Buddhism
Sharchops	Sino-Tibetan → Kalaktang–Tshangla → Tshangla	Bhutan (Lhuntse, Mongar, Pemagatshel, Samdrup Jongkhar, Trashigang, and Trashiyangtse Districts)		Buddhism → Tibetan Buddhism, Bon
Sherpas	Sino-Tibetan → Bodish → Sherpa	Nepal, India (Sikkim, West Bengal)		Buddhism
Shina	Indo-European → Indo-Iranian → Shina, Kohistani Shina	Pakistan (Gilgit-Baltistan)	Kohistani Shina	Islam
Shompen	Shompen	India (Great Nicobar Island)		Animism
Shors	Turkic → Common Turkic → Shor	Russia (Gornaya Shoriya, Khakassia, Altai Republic)		Christianity → Eastern Orthodoxy → Russian Orthodoxy, Shamanism → Shor Shamanism
Sibe	Tungusic → Jurchenic → Xibe	China (Liaoning, Jilin, Xinjiang)		Shamanism
Siberian Tatars	Turkic → Common Turkic → Tobol-Irtysh, Baraba, Tom (Note: While they are commonly subsumed into one Siberian Tatar language, the Tobol-Irtysh dialects belong to Kipchak-Nogai while the Baraba and Tom dialects belong to Kipchak-Kyrgyz.)	Russia (Western Siberia)	Baraba Tatars, Chats, Eushta Tatars, Kalmak Tatars, Siberian Bukharans, Zabolotnie Tatars	Islam → Sunnism
Siberian Yupik	Aleut–Inuit–Yupik → Inuit–Yupik → Siberian Yupik, Naukan	Russia (Chukchi Peninsula)	Naukan	Shamanism
Siddi	Niger–Congo → Bantu → Swahili (Note: The Siddi now speak the dominant language of their region.) → Sidi	Pakistan (Baluchistan, Sindh), India (Karnataka, Gujarat, Hyderabad)		Islam
Sika	Austronesian → Flores–Lembata → Sika	Indonesia (Sikka Regency)		Christianity → Catholicism
Sindhis	Indo-European → Indo-Iranian → Sindhi	Pakistan (Sindh)	Jat, Jamote, Memon, Arain, Indian Sindhis	Islam → Sunnism → Hanafism; Hinduism
Sinhalese	Indo-European → Indo-Iranian → Sinhala	Sri Lanka	Dewa, British Sri Lankans, Burghers (including Portuguese Burghers and Dutch Burghers)	Buddhism → Theravada Buddhism
Sogwo Arig	Sino-Tibetan → Tibetic → Lhasa Tibetan	China (Qinghai)		Buddhism → Tibetan Buddhism
Soyots	Turkic → Common Turkic → Taiga Sayan Turkic → Soyot	Russia (Okinsky District)		Shamanism
Sri Lanka Kaffirs	Indo-European → Portuguese-based creoles → Sri Lankan Portuguese Creole	Sri Lanka (Puttalam, Trincomalee, Batticaloa, Negombo)		Christianity → Catholicism; Buddhism → Theravada Buddhism
Sri Lankan Moors	Dravidian → Southern Dravidian → Tamil → Sri Lankan Muslim Tamil	Sri Lanka		Islam → Sunnism
Sri Lankan Chetties	Dravidian → Southern Dravidian → Tamil; Indo-European → Indo-Iranian → Sinhala	Sri Lanka		Christianity → Catholicism, Christianity → Protestantism → Anglicanism, Christianity → Protestantism → Calvinism
Subanons	Austronesian → Philippine → Subanon	Philippines (Zamboanga Peninsula)	Kolibugan, Lapuyan	Christianity, Islam, Animism
Sui	Kra–Dai → Kam–Sui → Sui	China (Sandu Shui Autonomous County)		Animism
Sulanese	Austronesian → Central Maluku → Sula	Indonesia (Sula Islands Regency)	Fagudu, Falahu, Fatcei, Mangon	Islam → Sunnism; Animism
Sumba	Austronesian → Sumba–Flores → Sumba	Indonesia (Sumba)	Anakalangu, East Sumbanese, Kodi, Lamboya, West Sumbanese, Mamboru, Wanukaka	Christianity → Protestantism
Sumbawa	Austronesian → Sumbawa	Indonesia (Sumbawa)		Islam
Sundanese	Austronesian → Malayo-Polynesian → Sundanese	Indonesia (Java)	Bantenese, Baduy, Ciptagelar	Islam → Sunnism
Sylhetis	Indo-European → Indo-Iranian → Sylheti	Bangladesh (Sylhet Division), India (Barak Valley)		Islam → Sunni Islam
Syriacs	Afroasiatic → West Semitic → Aramaic (Note: The Aramaic language morphed into the Neo-Aramaic languages around 1200 AD. Whether the majority of the Arameans are still speaking these languages is unclear, however.)	Syria (Qalamoun Mountains)	Arameans (includes Israeli Arameans), Chaldean Catholics from Nineveh and Bohtan, Citadel Christians	Christianity → Eastern Christianity → Syriac Christianity
Tagalogs	Austronesian → Philippine → Tagalog	Philippines		Christianity → Catholicism
Tajiks	Indo-European → Indo-Iranian → Tajik; Francosign → Austro-Hungarian Sign → Russian Sign → Tajik Sign; Turkic → Common Turkic → Tor Tajik	Central Asia, China (Tor)	Chagatai Tajiks, Gharmi Tajiks, Kharduri Tajiks, Kulobi Tajiks, Madaklashti Tajiks, Tor Tajiks, with significant populations in Uzbekistan, Pakistan	Islam → Sunni Islam
Talysh	Indo-European → Indo-Iranian → Talysh	Talish (Azerbaijan, Iran)		Islam → Shia Islam
Tamangs	Sino-Tibetan → Tibeto-Kanauri → Tamang	Nepal, India (Sikkim)	Waiba, Lopchan, Thokar, Lama	Hinduism, Buddhism
Tamils	Dravidian → Tamiloid → Tamil; Austronesian → Malay Creole → Malay Chetty	India (Tamil Nadu), Sri Lanka (Northern and Eastern Provinces)	Indian Tamils (including Indian Tamils of Sri Lanka), (Note: The Sri Lankan Tamils and Indian Tamils of Sri Lanka are distinct subgroups. The former are descended from the Tamil community that has lived in Sri Lanka since at least the 2nd century BCE, while the latter are the descendants of 19th- and 20th-century immigrants from South India. Also, most of the Indian Tamil population lives in the country's central highland region, while the native Tamils typically live in the Northern and Eastern Provinces.) Sri Lankan Tamils (including Negombo Tamils), Chitty, Giraavaru, Ambattar, along with significant populations in Malaysia, Singapore	Hinduism, Islam, Christianity, Jainism
Tampuans	Austroasiatic → Bahnaric → Tampuan	Cambodia (Ratanakiri)		Animism
Tao	Austronesian → Batanic → Tao	Taiwan (Orchid Island)		Christianity, Anitism
Tausūg	Austronesian → Bisayan → Tausug	Philippines (Sulu Archipelago)		Islam → Sunni Islam
Tboli	Austronesian → Philippine → Tboli	Philippines (South Cotabato)		Anitism
Tebers	Turkic → Common Turkic → Turkish → Teberce	Turkey, Syria, Balkans		Islam → Alevism
Telengits	Turkic → Common Turkic → Southern Altai → Telengit	Russia (Altai Republic)		Christianity → Eastern Orthodoxy, Shamanism, Burkhanism
Teleuts	Turkic → Common Turkic → Southern Altai → Teleut	Russia (Kemerovo Oblast)		Christianity → Eastern Orthodoxy → Russian Orthodoxy, Shamanism
Telugus	Dravidian → South-Central Dravidian → Telugu	India (Andhra Pradesh, Telangana, Odisha, Tamil Nadu)	Reddy, Velama, Kapu, Raju, Madiga, Mala, Kaikalas, Adi Andhra, Adi Jambava, Vatuka (including Kamma, Balijas (including Kavarais), Gollas), Mumbai Telugus, Sri Lankan Telugus, Konda Reddis (Note: They are entirely unrelated to the Telugu caste also known by the name Reddy. They are also a Scheduled Tribe.)	Hinduism, Islam, Christianity
Tetun	Austronesian → Malayo-Polynesian → Tetun	Timor-Leste, Indonesia (West Timor)	Fehan	Christianity → Catholicism, Protestantism
Thais	Kra–Dai → Tai → Central Thai, Southern Thai, Northern Thai, Northeastern Thai	Thailand	Southern Thai, Khorat, Lanna, Thai Isan and Thai diaspora	Buddhism → Theravada Buddhism
Tharus	Indo-European → Indo-Iranian → Tharu	Terai (Nepal, India)	Kathariya, Danuwar, Lampucchwa, Kochila, Sonha, Dangaura, Rana	Hinduism, Buddhism
Tibetans	Sino-Tibetan → Tibeto-Kanauri → Tibetic, Sino-Tibetan → Tibeto-Kanauri → Tshangla → Pemako Tshangla, Tibetan Sign	China (Tibet), Nepal, Bhutan	Amdolese (including Golok and Tebbu), Khams, U-Tsang (including Ngari and Walung), Pemakopas, Changpa, Baima, Kachee	Buddhism → Tibetan Buddhism, Bon
Tiwa	Sino-Tibetan → Sal → Tiwa	India (Assam, Meghalaya)		Hinduism
Tofalars	Turkic → Common Turkic → Tofa	Russia (Tofalariya)		Christianity
Toraja	Austronesian → South Sulawesi → Toraja	Indonesia (Tana Toraja)		Christianity → Protestantism
Trawara	Indo-European → Indo-Iranian → Mankiyali	Pakistan (Danna, Khyber Pakhtunkhwa)		Islam
Tripuri	Sino-Tibetan → Sal → Kokborok	India (Tripura)	Jamatia, Murasing	Hinduism
Tsakhurs	Northeast Caucasian → Lezgic → Tsakhur	Azerbaijan (Zagatala District, Qakh District)		Islam → Sunnism
Tujia	Sino-Tibetan → Tujia (Note: Due to the widespread presence of Chinese, the majority of Tujia only have a passive knowledge of their language.)	China (Wuling Mountains)		Nuo folk religion
Tuluvas	Tulu	India (Karnataka)		Hinduism
Turkish Levantines	Indo-European → French, Italian, German	Turkey		Christianity → Catholicism
Turkmens	Turkic → Common Turkic → Turkmen, South Azerbaijani, Afshar	Turkmenistan, Iran (Turkmen Sahra), Afghanistan	Teke, Yomut, Bayandur, Afshar, Begdili, Ersari, Chowdur, Saryk, Bayats, Kayıs, Iranian Turkmens, Afghan Turkmens, with significant populations in Pakistan	Islam → Sunni Islam
Turks	Turkic → Common Turkic → Turkish; Turkish Sign	West Asia, the Caucasus	Turkish Turks (includes the Baraks, Manavs, Elbegli, Tahtacı, and other Anatolian Turkoman tribes), Turkish Cypriots (including Mainland Turks), Meskhetian Turks, Iraqi Turkmen, Syrian Turkmen, Lebanese Turkmen, Jordanian Turkmen, Yörüks, Amuca, Turkish Roma, along with significant populations in Egypt, Qatar, Israel, and Palestine	Islam → Sunni Islam, Alevism
Tuvans	Turkic → Common Turkic → Steppe Sayan Turkic → Tuvan; Turkic → Common Turkic → Taiga Sayan Turkic → Tozhu Tuvan, Tere-Khöl Tuvan	Russia (Tuva), Mongolia (Khovsgol Province)	Tozhu Tuvans	Buddhism → Tibetan Buddhism
Udeges	Tungusic → Udegheic → Udege	Russia (Khabarovsk Krai, Primorsky Krai)		Shamanism
Ulchi	Tungusic → Southern Tungusic → Ulch	Russia (Ulchsky District)		Christianity → Eastern Orthodoxy → Russian Orthodoxy, Shamanism
Urak Lawoi	Austronesian → Malayic → Urak Lawoi	Thailand (Phuket)		Buddhism → Theravada Buddhism
Uyghurs	Turkic → Common Turkic → Uyghur	China (East Turkestan), Central Asia	Kashgartsy, Dolan (including Awat Dolan, Yarkand Dolan, Tarim Dolan and Lop Nur Dolan), Chantuu, Lops, with significant populations in Kazakhstan, Pakistan, Kyrgyzstan, Turkey	Islam → Sunni Islam
Uzbeks	Turkic → Common Turkic → Uzbek	Uzbekistan, Afghanistan	Ming, Yuzi, Kyrk, Karategin Uzbeks, Significant populations in Pakistan, and Turkey	Islam → Sunni Islam
Van Baoria	Indo-European → Rajasthani → Shekhawati	India (Rajasthan)	Vad Gujar, Param Veldo, Meowoti, Chandia, Gelot	Hinduism
Vedda	Indo-European → Sinhala-based creole → Vedda	Sri Lanka	Coast Veddas, Anuradhapura Veddas, Bintenne Veddas	Animism
Viet (Kinh)	Austroasiatic → Vietic → Vietnamese; Vietnamese sign languages	Vietnam	Gin in China; along with significant populations in the United States, Cambodia, Taiwan, Japan, Korea, Hong Kong, Laos, and France	Vietnamese folk religion; Buddhism → Mahayana; Caodaism; Hoa Hao; Chrisitianity
Visayans	Austronesian → Philippine → Bisayan	Philippines (Visayas)	Aklanon, Butuanon, Cebuano (including Boholano and Eskaya), Caluyanon, Capiznon, Cuyunon, Hiligaynon, Karay-a, Masbatenos, Negrenses, Porohanon, Romblomanon (including Bantoanons), Waray	Christianity → Catholicism
Wa	Austroasiatic → Palaungic → Wa	Myanmar (Wa State)		Buddhism, Animism
Wakhi	Indo-European → Indo-Iranian → Wakhi	Afghanistan, Tajikistan, Pakistan, China		Islam → Shia Islam → Isma'ilism → Nizari Isma'ilism
Waxiang	Sino-Tibetan → Sinitic → Waxiang Chinese	China (Hunan)		Chinese folk religion
Yaghnobis	Indo-European → Indo-Iranian → Yaghnobi, Tajik	Tajikistan (Sughd Region)		Islam → Sunni Islam
Yakan	Austronesian → Barito → Yakan	Philippines (Basilan)		Islam → Sunni Islam
Yakuts	Turkic → Common Turkic → Yakut	Russia (Yakutia)		Christianity → Eastern Orthodoxy
Yerukala	Dravidian → South Dravidian I → Yerukala	India (Andhra Pradesh, Telangana)		Hinduism
Yi	Sino-Tibetan → Loloish	China (Yunnan, Sichuan, Guizhou, Guangxi)	Phu La, Azha, Nasu	Bimoism
Yugh	Yeniseian → Northern Yeniseian → Yugh	Russia (Krasnoyarsk Krai)		Shamanism
Yugurs	Turkic → Common Turkic → Western Yugur; Mongolic → Eastern Yugur	China (Gansu)		Buddhism → Tibetan Buddhism, Tengrism
Yukaghir	Yukaghir languages	Russia (Yakutia)		Shamanism
Zamboanguenos	Indo-European → Spanish-based creoles → Chavacano	Philippines (Zamboanga City)		Christianity → Catholicism
Zazas	Indo-European → Indo-Iranian → Zaza	Turkey (Eastern Anatolia, Southeastern Anatolia)		Islam → Sunni Islam; Alevism
Zhuang	Kra–Dai → Tai → Zhuang (Note: Though many Zhuang languages are not closely related to each other, they are all known to be ethnolects spoken among Zhuangs.)	China (Zhuangia)		Moism
Zo	Sino-Tibetan → Kuki-Chin–Naga, Mruic	Zogam (Myanmar, Bangladesh, India)	Tedim (including Sizang), Thadou, Paite, Zou, Khyang, Khumi, Kom, Koireng, Mizo (including Khiangte, Hmar (including Saihriem and Zote), Renthlei, Chawngthu, Miu-Khumi, and Ralte), Aimol, Sukte, Bawm, Lai, Biate, Chin (including Asho, Daai, Lutuv, Mara, Matu, Mro-Khimi, Mru (including Anok, Tshungma, Domrong, Dopteng, and Rumma), Anu, Chho, Cumtu, and Hkongso (including Kasang, Htey, Kamu, Ngan, Gwa, Hteikloeh, Ngai, Rahnam, Kapu, Kasah, Namte, Krawktu, and Namluek)), Kuki (including Vaiphei, Khelma, Halam (including Korbong), Mate, and Simte) Zomi, Tashon, Gangte, and Bnei Menashe	Christianity

== See also‌ ==
- Jats of Afghanistan
- Indo-Aryan people
- History of Asia
- Yuezi
