= Lubu =

Lubu may refer to:

- the Lubu people of Indonesia or
- the Lubu language spoken by these people.
