= Telugu diaspora =

Telugu people living outside of Andhra Pradesh and Telangana, India

తెలుగు ప్రవాసులు
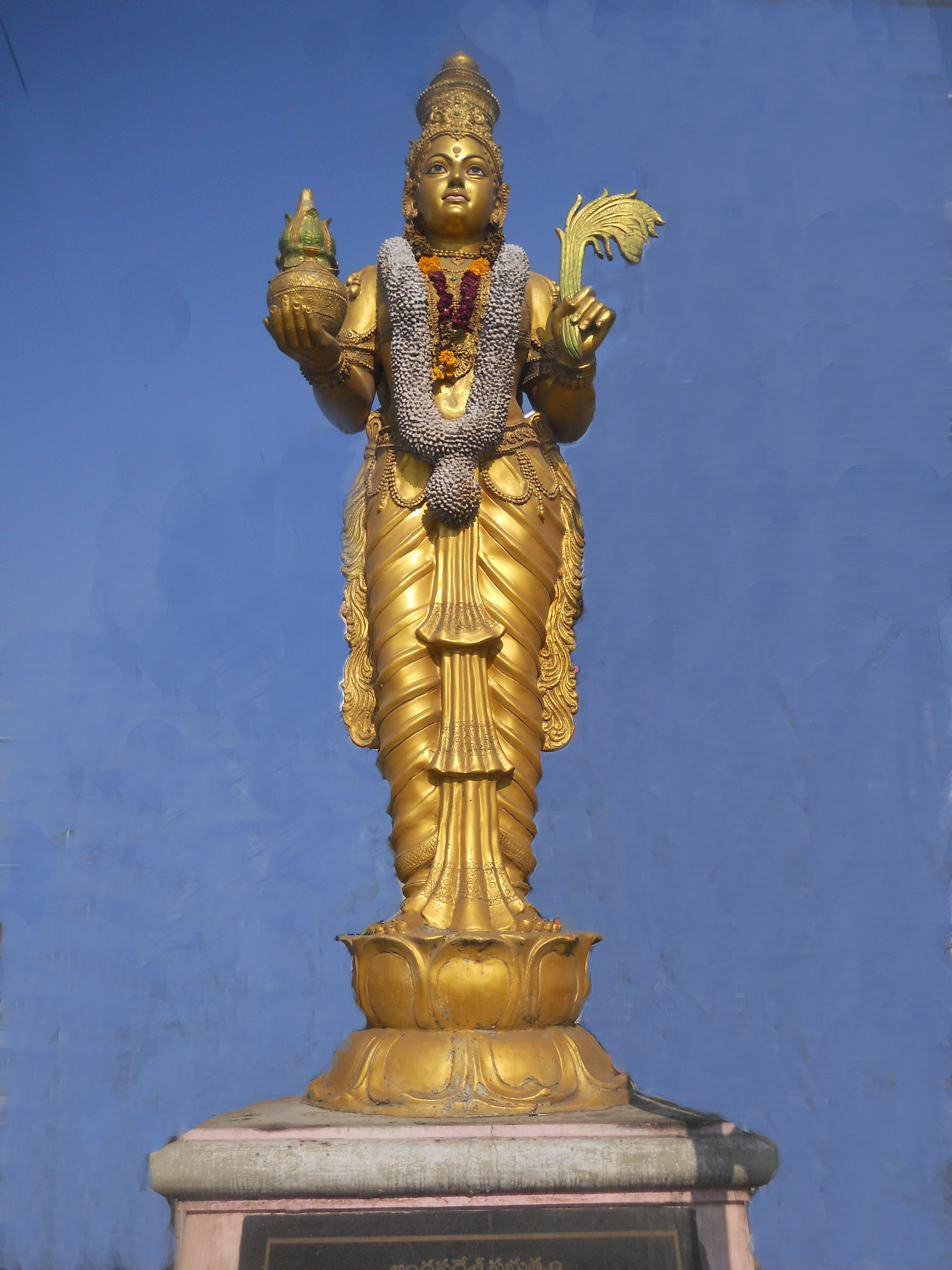
- Telugu Thalli, the personification of Telugu language

Total population
- c. 2.3 million
- United States: 1,230,000
- Saudi Arabia: 388,000
- Myanmar: 139,000
- Malaysia: 127,000
- Australia: 59,400
- Canada: 54,685
- Bangladesh: 40,000
- Singapore: c. 40,000
- Fiji: 35,000
- United Kingdom: 33,000
- Mauritius: 20,000
- Bahrain: 18,700
- Oman: 13,300
- New Zealand: 5,754
- South Africa: 5,000
- Sri Lanka: c. 4,000

Languages
- Telugu; English; vernacular languages of other countries in the diaspora

Religion
- Hinduism, Christianity, Islam

Related ethnic groups
- Telugu people

The Telugu Diaspora refers to Telugu people who live outside their homeland of Indian states of Andhra Pradesh and Telangana. They are predominantly found in North America, Europe, Australia, Caribbean, Gulf, Africa and other regions around the world. There are also Telugus from other Indian states such as Karnataka, Tamil Nadu, Odisha and Maharashtra, who live outside India. Telugus of Andhra Pradesh origin, living outside India are often referred as Non-resident Andhras (NRA). After the bifurcation of the United Andhra Pradesh, these are popularly referred as Non-resident Telugus.

== The Telugu Boom ==
The Telugu Boom refers to the migration of a large number of Telugu speaking people from the Indian states of Andhra Pradesh and Telangana to the United States of America from late 80s largely consisting of the migration of students and Information Technology workers which continues to the present day. As of 2017, as per Katherine Hadda, American Consulate general in Hyderabad, one in every four Indians going to USA is a Telugu person.

=== Background ===
With the onset of IT revolution in the late 1980s and 1990s coupled with high unemployment and corruption led more families to send their undergraduate children for higher studies to universities of developed countries on better job prospects. This was also supported with F1 visa program of USA and similar programs of other countries such as Canada and UK. The Y2K problem and Indian government's Software Technology Park initiative also helped many small companies to set up shops in Hyderabad that helped prospective employees to use H-1B Visa program.

== Effects of the Migration on the society of Andhra Pradesh ==
Andhra Bank and State Bank of Hyderabad predominantly regional banks of the state of AP have reported rise in Non Resident Indian deposits over the last decade.

== See also ==
- Malaysian Telugus
- Mumbai Telugus
- Sri Lankan Telugus
- Telugu Americans
- Telugu people
