= Lists of contemporary ethnic groups =

This is a list of lists of contemporary ethnic groups.

- List of contemporary ethnic groups of Africa
- List of contemporary ethnic groups of Asia
- List of contemporary ethnic groups of Europe
- List of contemporary ethnic groups of North America
- List of contemporary ethnic groups of Oceania
- List of contemporary ethnic groups of South America
- List of Indigenous peoples
- List of diasporas
- List of stateless nations

== Regional lists ==
- African people
  - Indigenous people of Africa
  - Ethnic groups in Algeria
  - Ethnic groups in Botswana
  - Ethnic groups in Burundi
  - Ethnic groups in Chad
  - List of ethno-linguistic groups in Eritrea
  - List of ethnic groups in Ethiopia
  - List of ethnic groups in Nigeria
    - List of ethnic groups in Rivers State
  - Ethnic groups in Rwanda
  - List of ethnic groups in Tanzania
  - Ethnic groups in Senegal
  - Ethnic groups in Sierra Leone
  - List of ethnic groups in South Sudan
  - List of ethnic groups in Zambia
- Asian people
  - List of contemporary ethnic groups of Asia
  - Ethnic groups in Northern Asia
    - List of ethnic groups in Russia
  - List of ethnic groups in East Asia
    - List of ethnic groups in China
    - List of ethnic groups in Japan
    - List of ethnic groups in North Korea
    - List of ethnic groups in South Korea
    - List of ethnic groups in Taiwan
      - List of indigenous peoples of Taiwan
  - South Asian ethnic groups
    - Ethnic groups in Nepal
    - Ethnic groups in Pakistan
      - Demographics of Sindh
    - List of Naga ethnic groups
  - Ethnic groups in Southeast Asia
    - Ethnic groups in Indonesia
    - List of ethnic groups in Laos
    - Ethnic groups in Malaysia
    - List of ethnic groups in Myanmar
    - Ethnic groups in the Philippines
    - List of ethnic groups in Vietnam
  - Ethnic groups in the Middle East
- European people
  - List of contemporary ethnic groups of Europe
  - Ethnic groups in Bosnia and Herzegovina
  - Peoples of the Caucasus
- Indigenous peoples of the Americas
  - List of contemporary ethnic groups of South America
  - Classification of indigenous peoples of the Americas
- Oceanian people
  - List of contemporary ethnic groups of Oceania
  - List of Indigenous Australian group names
  - List of Melanesian ethnic groups
    - List of New Guinean ethnic groups
  - List of Micronesian ethnic groups
  - List of Polynesian ethnic groups
- Ethnoreligious group
- Ethnic groups by country
