= Village guard system =

Militia guards

Security Ranger Department Güvenlik Korucuları Dairesi

Agency overview
- Formed: 26 March 1985
- Employees: 75,000 (2023)

Jurisdictional structure
- Operations jurisdiction: Turkey

Operational structure
- Parent agency: Gendarmerie General Command

Notables
- Significant operation: Kurdish–Turkish conflict

Website
- www.icisleri.gov.tr

Village guards (Turkish: Korucular lit. "Rangers") are the government-mandated militia that acts under the Gendarmerie General Command in Turkey.

== Background ==
The Village Guards were levied according to an amendment to the "Law of Temporary Village Guards" of 1924, which was introduced due to the lack of security officers after the war of independence.

Their stated purpose was to act as a local militia in towns and villages, protecting against attacks and reprisals from the insurgents of the Kurdistan Workers Party (PKK).

The rationale behind the establishment of the village guards was that it would be helpful to the Turkish Army to have an additional force of people who knew the Southeastern Anatolia Region and the Kurdish language in order to assist in military operations against the PKK.

== History ==
The establishment of the Village Guards resulted into a change of policy by the PKK, who reorganized its military wing at the 3rd party congress in October 1986 and made the joining of its military wing the Kurdistan People's Liberation Force compulsory.

Originally they were set up and funded by the Turkish state in the mid-1980s under the direction of Turgut Özal, the amendment was approved by the Turkish parliament in March 1985, after the first major confrontations between the PKK and Turkey.

From 1985 to 1990, recruitment of village guards was mainly accomplished by negotiating with tribal chieftains, with the tribes being awarded greater autonomy rights in exchange for their services.

In 2012 the Turkish Government indicated that it was planning to phase out the village guard system. But as the conflicts started again in 2014, the village guards assumed the local guiding and local protection operations.

This time, the state not only accepts volunteers. Now, in order to deal with the unemployment in the region, the government hires young people who just finished military service as commando, to become a village guard.

It became difficult for a male person to be a village guard since 2014, too many applications were made in the previous years.

The Gendarmerie General Command brought new conditions to become a village guard after announcing 25,000 people will be employed as village guards in 2019.

== Recruitment ==
There are separate classifications of paid and voluntary village guards, with both being allowed the bear weapons. In 1985 there were 3,679 weapons given to 7,933 village guards.

=== Evaluation ===
Turkey evaluated who could be an eventual ally against the PKK by assessing the loyalty of the tribes in the previous Kurdish revolts. The list was compiled in the 1970s.

The Bucak tribe joined in the early 1990s when the PKK attempted to compel the tribe to join the side of the PKK.

Tahir Adiyaman who reportedly had control over 5000 men in the region of Hakkari and Sirnak became a supporter of the village guard system.

Adiyaman had previously also fought against Turkish authority and took part in an attack in which a Turkish prosecutor and several Turkish soldiers were killed in 1975.

=== Selection ===
The applications made by those who want to be appointed as Security Village Guard are examined by the governorships or district governorships in accordance with the Temporary Village Guards Regulation and Directive.

Those who are deemed appropriate to be appointed as Security Village Guard are assigned to the villages or settlements they reside with the approval of the Provincial Governor.

Voluntary Security Guards (GGK) can be given priority to one of the children of the Security Guards, who are martyred or disabled to work in the fight against terrorism, those who died of death and who left their duties after completing their service term, or one of their siblings if they do not have children.

The newly recruited Security Village Guards receive two-week basic training at the beginning, and at least two-day in-service training every six months.

=== Requirements ===
- Be a citizen of Turkey.
- Being literate in Turkish.
- Having completed military service, not less than 22 years old and not over 60 years old.
- Not to be deprived of public rights.
- Not being convicted of a crime.
- Not being involved in destructive, divisive and reactionary activities being well-mannered and not fighting with everyone.
- Not having moodiness like drunkenness.
- To be residing in the village where he / she will work.
- To certify with a medical report that there is no physical or mental illness or bodily injury that prevents him from performing his duty.
- Security Guards must attend training programs.

=== Salary ===
The village guards receive an attractive salary.

In 2003, they earned a monthly salary of about $290 when the average income was $100. At times they received a monthly pay of around $230 US dollars while at the same time the annual salary was $400.

In 2019 the Security Guards were getting a monthly salary of 2020 TL. In 2020, the monthly salary of the Security Guards, together with the compensation, was 2243 TL.

=== Manpower ===
In 2019, the force consisted of approximately 54,000 village guards in total.

The members are mostly Kurds but also Circassians, Turks, Uzbeks and Kyrgyz people.

==== Death rates ====
The village guards are frequently targeted by PKK militants as they are seen as "traitors" for betraying the “Kurdish nation” or also seen as adherents to the feudal system.

A prominent attack against village guards and their relatives include the massacre committed in the Pinarcik village near Mardin in 1987.

The PKK often also hung village guards from trees and stuffed their mouths with money in order to deter the Kurdish population from joining the village guards. During the ongoing conflict since 2015, 62 village guards have been killed.

By the year 2000, over 1100 village guards have died in clashes with the PKK and about an additional 1100 were wounded.

== Controversies ==
=== Crimes ===
Village guards have immunity for crimes even for rapes or killings. The right to bear arms often lead to solving disputes between a village guard and a "terrorist" in the killing of the latter.

At times also minor conflicts during the soccer game of children or in business relations were solved this way.

The commission of Unresolved Killings from the Grand National Assembly of Turkey came to the conclusion that most of drug trafficking in the region is controlled by the Village Guards who trusted in their protection from prosecution.

Whilst not officially endorsed by the Turkish Government, some village guards are reported to have been involved in "disappearances", extrajudicial executions and torture.

The Turkish government reported that the Village Guards were implicated in attacks on Kurdish internally displaced persons returning to their villages after forced evacuation.

During the conflict Turkish government used village guard system to distinguish “loyal” and “disloyal” citizens and backed the system with material benefits and coercion.

A report by the Turkish Parliament in 1995 confirmed that village guards have been involved in not just these but a wide range of illegal activities, including killing, extortion, and drug smuggling.

Human Rights Watch has stated that for years they have received reports of "violations by village guards—murders, rapes, robberies, house destruction, and illegal property occupation, among others". They add however that not all of these reports have been confirmed first hand.

The Village Guards gained wealth through smuggling over the Turkish-Iraqi border for which they had immunity.

It was even stated by Van Bruinessen that some village guards were recruited among known smugglers. The amount of village guards surged from 18,000 to 63,000 between 1990 and 1994.

The Turkish Interior Ministry estimated that 296 murders were committed by village guards between 1985 and 1996. In a subsequent report in 2006, the Ministry indicated that some 5,000 village guards were involved in criminal activities.

=== Recruitment process ===
According to the US State Department, accepting to become a village guard is a voluntary process, but there are other reports of forced recruitments.

In a report by the Human Rights Watch, it is mentioned that if the villagers did not want to become village guards, it was likely that their settlement was surrounded by troops loyal to the Turkish government and then the village would be destroyed and evacuated.

Some people who refused to join the village guards have had their homes burned, or have been forced to leave and their homes and property seized. They have endured sexual assault and humiliation by the Turkish security forces.

There have been some attempts by the Turkish authorities to compensate people who have lost property in this way. A member of the Turkish Parliament, Ünal Erkan and former governor of some areas of south-eastern Turkey states that,

"village guards often operated outside the control of the gendarmerie, and that many villagers faced pressure to enter the system".

The journalist Gottfried Stein relates former lieutenant in the Turkish Army Yener Soylu as describing the process of persuading some villagers to join the village guards:

"We posed the people with a choice, either they acted as village guards, or they would be resettled in other provinces. In the evening, we staged what appeared to be a skirmish with the guerrillas, we shot at windows and also directed heavy weapons against the village. As the people depended on their harvest and animals, we destroyed their fields and slaughtered the animals. If this did not help, we surrounded the village and sent in the counter-guerrillas."

== See also ==
- Hamidiye (cavalry)
