= Chechens in Syria =

Minority group in Syria

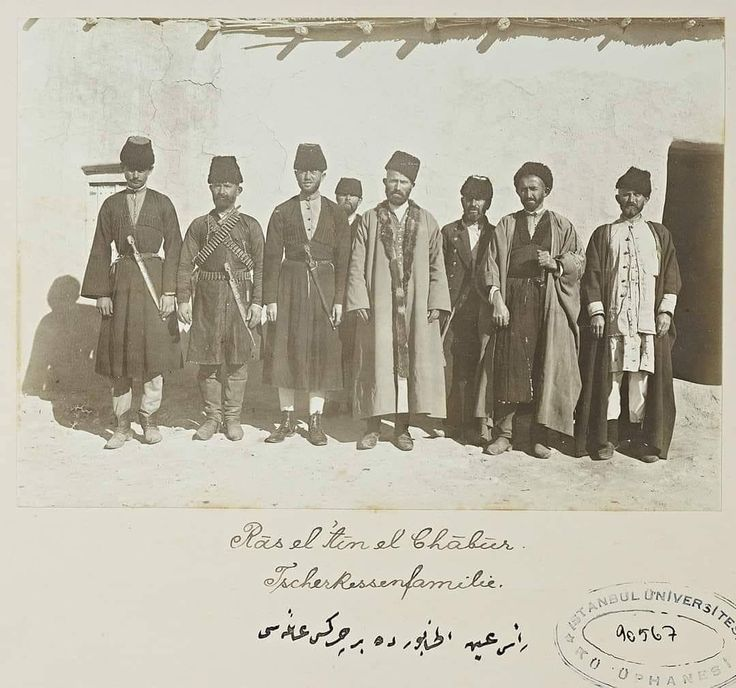
- Chechens in Ras al-Ayn, Syria, 1899.

Total population
- 10,000–35,000

Regions with significant populations
- Ras al-Ayn, Ayn Al-Arab, Al-Qamishli, Al-Malikiyah, Al-Hasakah, Afrin, Manbij, Damascus

Languages
- Arabic, Chechen

Religion
- Sunni Islam

Related ethnic groups
- Other Chechens (especially Chechen Kurds), Circassians in Syria

Chechens in Syria are ethnic Chechens who form a small minority in Syria.

== History ==
Syria is home to a substantial population of Chechens who emigrated there due to the Caucasian War and later the Chechen–Russian conflict. The initial Chechen migrants sometimes clashed with local Arab and Druze settlers, though they later peacefully integrated into Syrian society. After the Syrian civil war's outbreak in 2011, however, about 3,000 Chechen militants also travelled to Syria in order to wage jihad there, and formed numerous anti-government militias. The most notable Chechen-led groups in Syria were Jaish al-Muhajireen wal-Ansar, the Caucasus Emirate (Syrian branch), Junud al-Sham and Ajnad al-Kavkaz.

The hostility of Chechens to the Assad regime was strengthened by the close relationship between Russia and its client Assad, and the long historical Chechen–Russian conflict. Chechen soldiers also fought on Assad’s side - they were mostly sent by Chechnya's pro-Kremlin leader Ramzan Kadyrov.

== Population ==
There are no reliable figures on ethnic minorities in Syria, however, estimates on the Chechen minority ranged from 10,000 to 35,000 in 2024.

The Chechen community in the Golan Heights fled following the 1967 Israeli occupation of the Golan Heights, with many Chechen refugees moving to Damascus whilst others emigrated abroad, especially to the United States.

== Culture ==
Due to repression by the Syrian Ba'athist government, the Chechen minority have had little success in preserving their language and culture. The Encyclopedia of Arabic Language and Linguistics places the Chechen language as the sixth-most spoken language in the country.
