= Chechen Kurds =

Kurdified Chechens living in Iraqi and Turkish Kurdistan

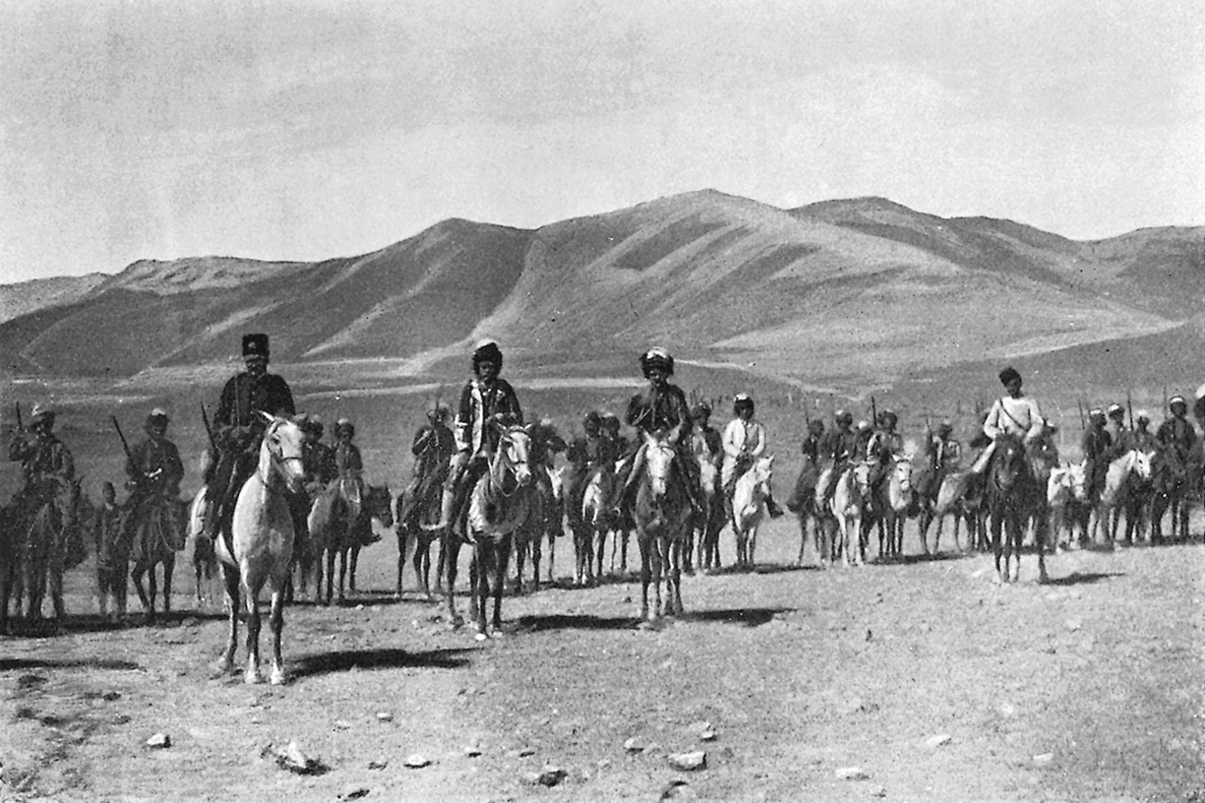
- Hamidiye cavalry at Varto (1901) – Both Chechens and Kurds joined the cavalry.

Regions with significant populations
- Following villages in Varto district: Bağiçi (Çaharbur); Kayalık (Zirinik); Tepeköy (Tepe); Tescilsiz (Doğdap); Ulusırt (Aynan); Aydıngün (Şaşkan), Çöğürlü (Arinç) and Kıyıbaşı villages in Muş district Kızıltepe; Saidsadiq District

Languages
- Kurdish (as mother tongue), Turkish, Chechen

Religion
- Hanafi and Shafi‘i Islam

Chechen Kurds or Kurdified Chechens are ethnic Chechens who went through a process of Kurdification after fleeing to the region of Kurdistan during and after the Russian conquest of the Caucasus in the 1860s. Today, these Chechens are perceived as being of the "Chechen tribe" and "Lezgî tribe".

Chechen families were first settled in other regions of the Ottoman Empire like the Balkans, but were since moved to Kurdistan by the Sublime Porte. The Ottomans planted Chechen refugees in Kurdistan and Western Armenia to change the demographics, since they feared Armenian separatism and, later on, Kurdish separatism.

Today, the Chechen population in Turkish Kurdistan is scattered among the Kurdish population and has been assimilated into it. About 200 to 300 Kurdified Chechen families live in Saidsadiq District, some 100 families in Penjwen District and about 200 in Sulaymaniyah city in Iraqi Kurdistan.

== History ==
=== Migration to Kurdistan ===
As the first migration wave occurred in the late 1850s, Ottoman authorities managed to direct the refugees towards the Balkans, Western-, and Central Anatolia, since Russia warned the Ottomans not to settle them near the Russian border. The reasons none were settled in Kurdistan were due to the extreme poverty and the lack of materials needed for a settlement. Nevertheless, some migrants settled around Sarıkamış and founded about 20 villages on land previously owned by Armenians and Greeks. Chechen refugees preferred the mountainous region of Eastern Anatolia including Kurdistan, due to its resemblance to North Caucasus and in the early 1860s about 6,000 to 8,000 Caucasian refugees including Chechens settled in Sarıkamış. In 1865, the Ottoman authorities planned on settling 5,000 to 6,000 Chechen refugees in the Turkish-majority town of Çıldır, but the Russians opposed as it was too close to the front. As a result, most of them were settled southward in the unofficial Kurdish capital of Diyarbakir and Ras al-Ayn in present-day Syria. Between 1901 and 1905, Chechen refugees settled in the Kurdish towns of Varto and Bulanık since other ethnic groups like Circassians had already settled there. No exact numbers exist for the number Chechens in Kurdistan, but the Jordanian Circassian author Amjad Jaimoukha estimates that 80,000 Chechens left for the Ottoman Empire in 1860 and 23,000 in 1865, however this number seems highly overestimated in retrospect when looking at the number of the Chechen diaspora in the former Ottoman empire today.

=== Later history ===
When H. F. B. Lynch visited Eastern Anatolia in 1901, he wrote that the Circassians (referring to Chechens) wore traditional clothing and that their living standards were far better than that of their Armenian and Kurdish neighbours. In 1925, the Kurds of the newly proclaimed Republic of Turkey staged a rebellion led by Sheikh Said. Some local Chechens supported the rebellion while others actively worked to constrain it.

While it was already reported by Kurdish writer Mehmet Şerif Fırat, in his description of Varto in 1948 that the local Chechens there had forgotten the Chechen language, the Turkish state claimed in a secret report in 1987 that the Chechens spoke Kurdish as their mother tongue.

== Villages and politics in Turkish Kurdistan ==
Province	Tribe, Population	Village	Note
Muş Province	Lezgî tribe 641 (1987)	Bağiçi (Çaharbur)	Kurdish-speaking Chechens
Muş Province	Lezgî tribe 641 (1987)	Kayalık (Zirinik, Zırınge)	Kurdish-speaking Chechens
Muş Province	Çeçen tribe 387 (1987)	Tepeköy (Tepe) and Tescilsiz (Doğdap) hamlet	Kurdish-speaking Chechens
Muş Province	Çeçen tribe 387 (1987)	Ulusırt (Aynan)	Kurdish-speaking Chechens
Muş Province	—	Kıyıbaşı	Mixed Kurdish and Chechen village
Muş Province	—	Çöğürlü (Arinç)	Mixed Kurdish, Chechen and Arab village
Muş Province	—	Aydıngün (Şaşkan) hamlet of Serinova village	Mixed Kurdish and Chechen village

== See also ==
- Persecution of Muslims
- Chechen genocide
- A Modern History of the Kurds by David McDowall
