= Uyghurs in Kyrgyzstan =

Ethnic group in Kyrgyzstan

Total population
- 60,210 (2021)

Regions with significant populations
- Bishkek, Ferghana Valley

Languages
- Uyghur, Russian, Kyrgyz, Mandarin Chinese

Religion
- Sunni Islam

The Uyghurs arrived in modern-day Kyrgyzstan in three separate migrations throughout the 19th and 20th centuries. According to official statistics, they make up about 0.9% of the national population.

== Migration history ==
Uyghur migration to Kyrgyzstan can be analysed in three waves. The first wave began in the late 19th century. Some Uyghurs from Kashgar came with the Dungans to the Ferghana Valley in the aftermath of the 1862–1877 uprising in Northwest China; the total number to settle there (including both Uyghurs and Dungans) was about 7,000 people, according to contemporary Russian reports. Later, in the early 20th century, Uyghurs, Dungans and Chinese alike came as migrant workers to find employment in coal mines and cotton mills. The second wave consists of those who fled Xinjiang after the People's Republic of China established control in the area or during the hardships of the Great Leap Forward and the Cultural Revolution. The people in this second wave tend to be connected to the political and intellectual elite of the Second East Turkestan Republic and accordingly sometimes look down on the migrants who came before or after them. The 1979 Soviet census found 29,817 Uyghurs in the Kirghiz Soviet Socialist Republic, making up 0.8% of the population. Their numbers continued to grow in the following decade; the 1989 census found 36,779 (0.9%). The third wave of migration consists of sojourners, PRC citizen traders of Uyghur and other ethnicities who take up temporary residence, typically in Bishkek, to engage in trade. The 1999 Kyrgyzstan census found 46,944 Uyghurs living in the country (1.0%); the 2009 census found 48,543 (0.9%); and in 2021 there were 60,210 Uyghurs living in the country. Unofficial statistics give even higher estimates, ranging from 100,000 to 200,000 people; Uyghur organisations explain the discrepancy as the result of Uyghurs registering themselves as Uzbeks in their official papers.

== Trade and employment ==
Uyghur migrants who have come from Xinjiang to Kyrgyzstan to engage in cross-border trade tend to cluster in the East-5 suburb of Bishkek. Their bilingualism has enabled them to act as business intermediaries between Han Chinese and local people. However, their bazaars have become the targets of numerous attacks. In 2000, a fire broke out in the Tour Bazaar. Uyghurs attempting to investigate arson were attacked in their car, with two being shot to death. Another suspicious fire occurred there in 2002; water service was mysteriously disrupted that day, and Uyghurs accused the police of engaging in looting during the blaze. A PRC government report accused the Uyghur Liberation Organisation of starting the fire. In 2005, the Uyghur-dominated Madina Bazaar was set on fire in election-related riots, and Uyghur traders there suffered beatings and lootings.

Uyghurs also run a number of famous restaurants in Bishkek, including Diyar, Arzu and Arcada.

== Education ==
Unlike neighbouring Kazakhstan, Kyrgyzstan lacks formal education in Uyghur. However, some elders run informal schools to teach the language. As a result, the command of the Uyghur language among youth is declining. Many can speak, but are unable to read, the Uyghur Ereb Yéziqi (Perso-Arabic orthography).

== Organisations ==
The Uyghur organisation Ittipak was founded in 1989. It is seen as a separatist group by the Chinese government, which has applied pressure to the Kyrgyzstani government to supervise it more closely. In 2000, their chairman Nigmat Bazakov was assassinated; Kyrgyzstan officials arrested four members of the East Turkestan Liberation Organization and tried them for the murder, but many local Uyghurs believe the assassination was actually the work of Chinese government agents. After their chairmanship election in July 2003, officials of the Ministry of the Interior came to their office and searched their papers. Ittipak supported the winner Kurmanbek Bakiyev in the 2009 presidential elections. However, government pressure against them continued even after Bakiev's victory; in August that year, as their 20th anniversary celebration neared, Kyrgyzstani authorities detained their chairman Dilmurat Akbarov and deputy chairman Jamaldin Nasyrov during a demonstration on the outskirts of Bishkek against Chinese government policies in Xinjiang.

Ittipak also publishes an eponymous newspaper, funded by donations from the Uyghur diaspora as well as the Open Society Institute.

In 2006, the Uyghur American Association established a Uyghur Human Rights Project satellite office in Bishkek, Kyrgyzstan.

== Inter-ethnic relations ==
Common stereotype portrays them as mostly successful people in trading. However, during the 2010 Kyrgyzstani riots, anti-government protests in Tokmok escalated into ethnic riots, and Uyghur and Dungan shops and houses were attacked, resulting in the hospitalisation of 11 people.

== Sources ==
- Hojer, Lars (March 2009), What does it take 'to migrate'? Uyghur perspectives from Kyrgyzstan (PDF), Research Fellows Reports, American University of Central Asia
- Millward, James (2004), Violent Separatism in Xinjiang: A Critical Assessment (PDF), Policy Studies, Washington, DC: East-West Center, ISBN 1-932728-11-2, archived from the original (PDF) on 2012-02-22
- Zhaparov, Amantur (February 2009), "The Issue of Chinese Migrants in Kyrgyzstan" (PDF), China and Eurasia Forum Quarterly, 7 (1): 81–91
