= Bhil Mavchi =

The Mavchi are one of the sub-groups of the community found in the state of Maharashtra in India. They are also known as Gavit.

They mostly found in Sakri, Navapur talukas.

== Origin ==
The community is also referred to as Gavit, which means a headman, because village headmen were often chosen from the Mavchi community. They speak their own dialect, Mavchi, which is distinct from other Bhil dialects, having less Marathi loanwords. the community is similar to Gamit community of neighbouring Tapi District of Gujarat. The dialect of both communities is similar. Mavchi has more Marathi words since people are educated in Marathi while for Gamits education is done in Gujarati and they use more Gujarati words. however basic words are same mostly used by elderly and illiterate people. The village heads were appointed from these communities. for village "GAV" in Marathi and therefore Gavit in Maharashtra and similarly 'GAM' in Gujarati and Gamit in Gujarat. Both communities has social ties including marriages etc. Bothsides they have relations in Gujarat and Maharashtra. In 1960 the Uchhal taluka was full of Mavchi community. The Taluka was transferred to Gujarat from Maharashtra and suddenly they became Gamits.

== Present circumstances ==
The Mavchi are an endogamous community, and practice clan exogamy, There customs are similar to neighbouring Bhil groups such as the Vasave, Valvi, Gavit. The Mavchi are a community of small and medium-sized farmers. Some are now beginning to migrate to the cities of Surat and Mumbai, and work in the sugar mills. The Mavchi are divided into two groups, the Christian and Hindu Mavchi. This is recent phenomena with the spread of Christianity among community. Among the Hindus, there also exists a number of ancestral non-Hindu tribal deities, such as Hiwaryo dev, Gaondev, Kuwarli, Devalimadi, Yahamogi, etc. Waghdev is worshipped on full moon day of Sravan month and celebrated as festival. With spread of education among community Ganapati festival, Navratri etc. are also celebrated.
