= Koreans in Sri Lanka =

Ethnic group

Total population
- 948 (2011)

Regions with significant populations
- Colombo, Negombo, Gampaha, Kandy, Nuwara Eliya

Related ethnic groups
- Korean diaspora

There are roughly 948 Koreans in Sri Lanka, according to the 2013 statistics of South Korea's Ministry of Foreign Affairs and Trade).

== Demography ==
The number of Koreans in Sri Lanka was recorded at 854 in 2009, 948 in 2011, and 782 in 2013. Among them were 268 international students studying at Sri Lankan universities, and 514 with other types of visas. The vast majority (513) lived at Colombo, with another 96 in Western Province (namely Negombo and Gampaha), 124 in Central Province (Kandy and Nuwara Eliya), and 49 in other areas.

== Religion ==
South Korean Christian missionaries are active in Sri Lanka. They have conducted charitable activities, such as constructing disaster assistance centres. However, their activities to promote religious conversion have also caused conflict with the predominantly Buddhist and Hindu local people.

== Community organisations ==
There is a Korean Association of Sri Lanka, as well as a weekend school for Korean language. The former has organised various public events to inform the public about Korean culture and history, such as a special lecture commemorating the start of the Korean War.
