= Tebbu people =

The Tebbu people (Chinese: 迭部人; pinyin: Diébù rén) are a Tibetan-Himalayan ethnic group indigenous to the Min Mountains along the Bailong River and its tributaries in Tewo County and possibly the eastern part of Zhugqu County in southern Gansu Province, Tibet. They speak the Amdo Tibetan language. The Tebbu population is currently estimated at more than 20,000 individuals.
