= Vietnamese people in Laos =

Regions with significant populations
- Vientiane, Champasak, Savannakhet, Khammouane

Languages
- Vietnamese, Laotian

Religion
- Folk religion, Buddhism, Catholicism

Related ethnic groups
- Vietnamese diaspora

There is a large community of Vietnamese people in Laos. As Vietnam and Laos are neighbours, there is a long history of population migrations between the territories which today make up the two respective countries.

== Migration history ==
When Laos was a French protectorate, the French colonial administration brought many Vietnamese people to Laos to work as civil servants. As a result, ethnic Vietnamese became the majority of large urban centers in Laos. For example, during the 1940s, ethnic Vietnamese made up of 72% and 85% of the population in Savannakhet and Thakhek, respectively. In 1943, 53% of the population of Vientiane were Vietnamese. This matter was the object of strenuous opposition by Phetsarath Ratanavongsa, who in the 1930s made an unsuccessful attempt to replace Vietnamese in the government with Lao people. After Vietnamese emperor Bảo Đại's declaration of Vietnamese independence in 1945, Vietnamese people all over Laos held demonstrations; in particular, members of Savannakhet's Vietnamese youth association staged a march through the town waving a Japanese imperial Rising Sun Flag and a Vietnamese flag. As many as 80% of the Vietnamese population in Laos departed, either repatriating to Vietnam or resettling in northeastern Thailand, following the French reconquest of Laos in 1946.

== Community organisations ==
In the Laotian capital of Vientiane, the Nguyen Du Kindergarten and Elementary School enrolls 2,000 students of both Vietnamese and Lao origin, providing them with an education using Vietnamese as the medium of instruction. Another organisation is the Association of Vietnamese People in Laos (Tổng hội người Việt Nam tại Lào), which has organised various activities such as football games between Vietnamese and Lao people, as well as collecting donations for charitable activities.
