= Sogwo Arig =

Regions with significant populations
- China: 40,000? (2013)

Languages
- Tibetan language, Oirat Mongolian (Henan County Dialect)

Religion
- Tibetan Buddhism and Bon

Related ethnic groups
- Mongolic peoples

The Sogwo Arig (or Sog Mongols) are a Mongolic ethnic group claim to be descendants of Yuan dynasty rulers in Henan, Qinghai, China. The name "Sogwo" derives from Tibetan word "Sogbo" meaning "Mongol". French traveller Vicomte Henri d'Ollone met with them in 1906 and the Sogwo Arig lord signed a letter with the title of "King of Henan." Vicomte d'Ollone wrote: "When the Mongols were expelled from China, the dynasty of the kings of Ho-Nan [Henan] - kings without a kingdom - retired to their steppes; and when in their turn the Manchus seized the empire [1644] they utilized the Mongols for the purpose of holding the Tibetans in check, for which reason a horde was sent to establish itself in this region." The Sogwo Arig Mongol lords held their royal title until the 1950s. They are nomads who live in Mongolian style yurts.

== Bibliography ==
- Peoples on the Move: Introducing the Nomads of the World
