= Saidsadiq District =

Saidsadiq District قه‌زای سه‌یدسادق Arabic: قضاء سيد صادق
- District
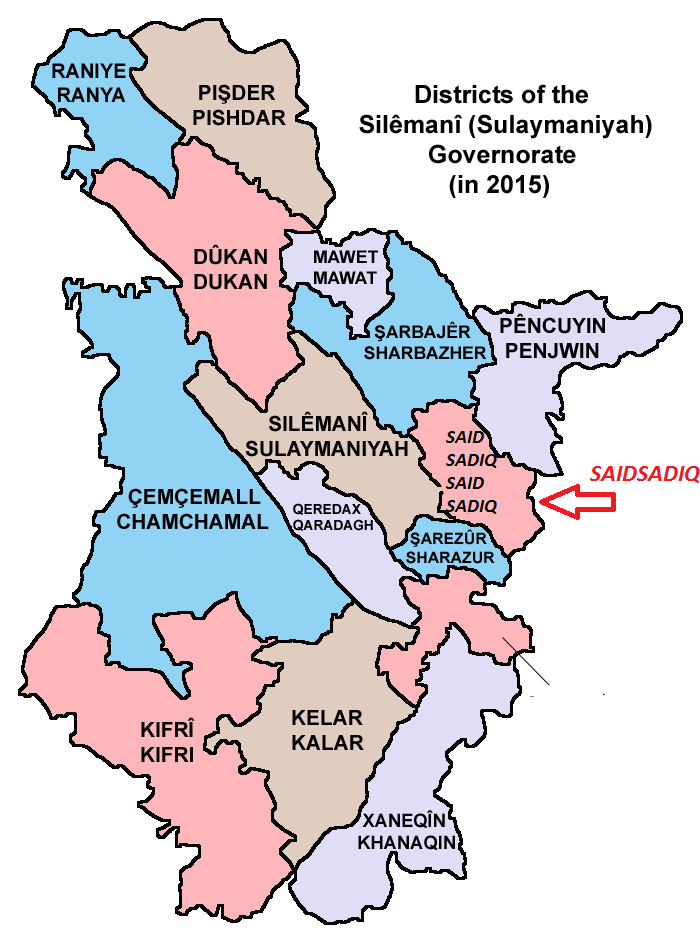
- Districts of the Sulaymaniyah Governorate, with Saidsadiq indicated
- Coordinates: 35°35′22″N 45°45′51″E
- Country: Iraq
- Governorate: As Sulaymaniyah Governorate

Population (2014)
  - Total: 115,000
- Time zone: UTC+3 (UTC+3)
- Website: http://www.saidsadq.net/

Saidsadiq District (Arabic: قضاء سيد صادق; Sorani Kurdish: قه‌زای سه‌یدسادق, romanized: Qezay Seyidsadiq) is a district of Sulaymaniyah Governorate in the Kurdistan Region, Iraq. The main town of Said Sadiq part of Shahrizor area, is 47 kilometers south-east of the city of Sulaymaniyah. There is more than one story about the naming of Sayed Sadiq city. It is said that a man named Sidsadeg built the city. It is also said that the name came from the name of Mount Sincere in Iraqi Kurdistan. Sidesadeg has more than 100,000 inhabitants and more than 25,000 houses. It is a cosmopolitan city.

In 1988, the army of Saddam Hussein destroyed more than 23,000 houses and killed 6,000 people.

Large protests erupted in the city of Sidsadeg on 2 January 2014 because of poor public services and opposition to a proposal to include the district in halabja Governorate. The protesters demanded the resignation of the mayor, who did resign after security forces shot and killed one protester and wounded more than 100.
