= Chho tribe =

Tribe of Mizo people found in Chin state, Myanmar

The Chho are one of the eleven tribes of the Chin-Kuki-Mizo people.

== Social life ==
=== Revenge murder ===
In contrast to their hospitality, murder for the cause of revenge is the strangest tradition they keep. The root cause of this tradition is not known. However, this tradition is not observed in other Mizo people living nearby (the Chinboi, Yindu and Yaw tribes). In 1968, the Burmese government attempted to eradicate this tradition of revenge-murder. In the beginning, the people were afraid their tradition would be completely eradicated, which resulted in a higher rate of murder. Till 1973, the murder rate was much less than before.
