= Citadel Christians =

Turkish-speaking Assyrian community in Kirkuk

Kale Hristiyanları قلعه مسیحیلری

Regions with significant populations
- Kirkuk, Iraq

Languages
- Distinct Turkish dialect Ottoman Turkish (liturgical)

Religion
- Chaldean Catholic Church

Related ethnic groups
- Assyrians, Iraqi Turkmen

The Citadel Christians (Turkish: Kale Hristiyanları; colloquially: قلعه مسیحیلری; romanised: Qəl‘ə Məsihiləri) are a community of ethnic Assyrians who speak their own dialect of Turkish and religiously follow the Chaldean Catholic Church. They are native to Kirkuk and have traditionally been the caretakers of the Kirkuk Citadel.

== History ==
They are ethnic Assyrians from Kirkuk who lived in or near the citadel, where they adopted the Turkish language from Iraqi Turkmen, especially during the Ottoman Empire. Their dialect is mutually intelligible with the Iraqi Turkmen dialect. Their official hymns, eulogies, and prayers are in Turkish. Their bible is in the Ottoman Turkish language written in the 1800s and is recited by community leaders. The Citadel Christians are distinct from the community of Iraqi Turkmen who follow the Roman Catholic Church. Iraqi Turkmen Catholics were Latin Catholic and were a significantly larger community, numbering around 30,000 in 2015. They lived in all areas of Turkmeneli, including Kirkuk. The Citadel Christians were Chaldean Catholic, lived only in Kirkuk, and were ethnically Assyrian whereas the Iraqi Turkmen were ethnically Turkic. The Citadel Christians, however, enjoyed good relations with Iraqi Turkmen and were both persecuted by the Ba'ath regime and the Islamic State. The Citadel Christians were described as a community of "a few thousand" in 2017. The Citadel Christians, and minorities in Kirkuk in general, had much cultural heritage destroyed by the Islamic State, and had most of their churches were shelled or destroyed, and many of them migrated. The community identifies as Assyrian, though they embrace their Turkish aspects and do not view themself as assimilated. A leader of the community stated that "our language since the days of our ancestors is Turkish, which we consider our mother tongue, and on top of that, we do not know anything about Chaldean. Our traditions of cooking, activity, culture, clothing, and civil life, are all Turkish". The Citadel Christians also saw the visit by Pope Francis to Iraq in 2021 as a symbol of hope for the future.
