= Dumpas =

Dumpas people Orang Dumpas
Total population
- 1,500

Regions with significant populations
- Malaysia

Languages
- Dumpas, Tambanuo, Malaysian (Sabah Malay)

Religion
- Islam

Related ethnic groups
- Tambanuo people, and other Kadazan-Dusuns

The Dumpas are an indigenous ethnic group residing in Sabah, Malaysia. They reside in the villages of Rancangan Nangoh and Perancangan of the Beluran district in the Sandakan Division. Their population was estimated at 1,078 in the year 2000. Their language (ISO 639-3 dmv) belongs to the Paitanic branch of the Austronesian language family. The language is dying out as a result of intermarriage with other groups, and since native speakers also use Tambanuo in their daily conversation.
