= Mangka'ak =

Mangka'ak people Orang Mangka'ak / Mengka'ak
Total population
- 20,583 (2000)

Regions with significant populations
- Malaysia (Sabah)

Languages
- Mangka'ak (native), Malaysian in the Sabah Malay dialect.

Related ethnic groups
- Kadazan-Dusun

The Mangka'ak are an indigenous ethnic group residing in Sabah, eastern Malaysia on the island of Borneo. They primarily reside in the Sandakan, Labuk-Sugut, and Kinabatangan districts in northeastern Sabah. The population of Mangka'ak was estimated at 20,583 in the year 2000. They are a sub-group of the Kadazan-Dusun, and their language (ISO 639-3 dtb) belongs to the Dusunic branch of the Austronesian language family. The language is threatened with extinction, as most of the current generation use standard Malay in everyday speech.
