= Sasoli =

Brahui tribe in Pakistan

The Sasoli (Brahui: ساسولی) is an ethnic Brahui tribe in the Balochistan province of Pakistan. It is one of the eight nuclear Brahui tribes, and predominantly speaks the Brahui language.
