= Lubu people =

Ethnic group native to Indonesia

Total population
- 53,000

Regions with significant populations
- Indonesia (Mandailing Natal Regency)

Languages
- Lubu language, Mandailing language, Indonesian language

Religion
- Islam

Related ethnic groups
- Mandailing people, Minangkabau people

Lubu people are an ethnic group who live in central Sumatra, Indonesia. They are similar to the Kubu people, and are also ancestral to the Siladang people. They live in the mountainous regions of Padang Lawas, South Tapanuli, and Mandailing Natal regencies (all are located within North Sumatra Province jurisdictions). They are now in the process of being absorbed by the Batak. In the early 20th century, they were a migratory people who lived in tree houses, and now are still a tribal people. Although they live near the rivers, they are fearful of water. They speak the Lubu language.
