= Sri Lankan Telugus =

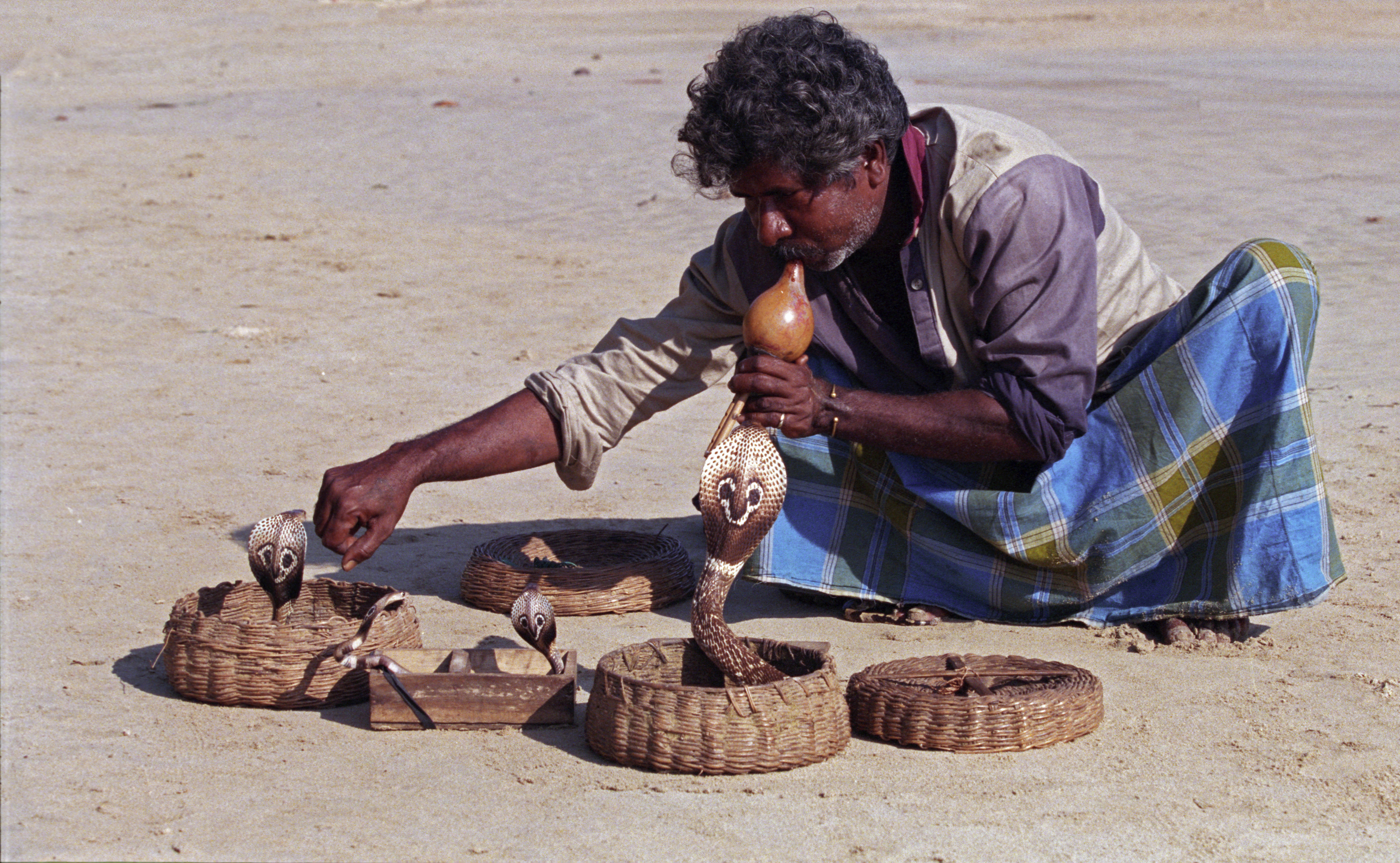
- Sri Lankan itinerant Snake Charmer

Total population
- c. 40,000 - 125,000

Regions with significant populations
- Sri Lanka

Languages
- Sri Lankan Gypsy Telugu (native), Sinhala, Tamil

Religion
- Shaivism, Buddhism, Christianity (minority)

Related ethnic groups
- Sinhalese, Telugu people, Tamils

The Sri Lankan Telugus are an ethnic-Telugus from Sri Lanka. They trace their origins to Telugu-speaking regions centuries ago. They are commonly known in English as Sri Lankan Gypsies, in Sinhala as Ahikuntaka and in Tamil as Kuravar. However, some of these terms are considered as offensive by the community, who call themselves as Telugu. They are one of the historically nomadic groups of people living in Sri Lanka. They live in small palmyra huts for approximately one week in one place. Their ancestral language is an old form/dialect of Telugu known as Sri Lankan Gypsy Telugu, though most now speak Tamil or Sinhala with outsiders. Various governments, NGOs and missionary societies have made attempts to settle them down, and thus some are settled in villages. Their traditional occupations are fortune telling, snake charming and training monkeys and dogs for performances, though modernisation has forced many into wage labour. Those who are settled in resettlement villages are subsistence farmers and farm hands to other farmers. They also speak Tamil or Sinhalese based on their area of settlement. Most seem to be settled in the eastern Batticaloa district. The traditional faith is a form of Shaivism, though a number of them had converted to Buddhism and some to Christianity. According to a 2017 survey by the Government of Sri Lanka, their population is ~40,000 and it is estimated that the actual population is 125,000 and most Telugu Sri Lankans recognise themselves as Sinhalese people.

== See also ==
- Xavierpuram massacre
