= Mumbai Telugus =

Social Community

Mumbai Telugus are ethnic-Telugus in Mumbai. There are about 500,000 Telugu-language speakers in Mumbai. This includes both native Mumbaikars, and those born in the Telugu states, or elsewhere in the Telugu diaspora.

== History ==
The presence of the Telugu community in Maharashtra dates back to the era of Chhatrapati Shivaji of the Maratha Empire. Historical records indicate that a significant migration of Telugus to Maharashtra occurred during the 17th century.

A devastating famine in Hyderabad State fueled fresh migration to Mumbai in the early 20th century, when the city was in the midst of a textile and real estate boom. Many Telugu Padmasalis joined textile mills. Others helped construct notable Mumbai landmarks such as the Metro Cinema and the art-deco apartments in South Mumbai. Sayajirao Silam and Narasimha Puppala, Mumbai's leading political figures in the 1950s, were Telugus.
