= Lubu language =

Malayic language in Indonesia

Lubu
- Native to: Indonesia
- Region: North Sumatra
- Ethnicity: Lubu
- Native speakers: (30,000 cited 1981)
- Language family: Austronesian: Malayo-Polynesian; Malayic; Lubu

Language codes
- ISO 639-3: lcf
- Glottolog: lubu1241

Lubu is a Malayic language spoken by the Lubu people on the island of Sumatra in Indonesia. It is surrounded by speakers of Batak Mandailing.
