= Kyrgyz in Turkey =

The Kyrgyz people in Turkey arrived in Turkey in small groups as a result of invasion of Central Asia by Russian Empire during the 20th century. As of 2024, Turkish Statistical Institute recorded 23,802 Kyrgyz living in Turkey, an increase of 1,325 from the year before.

== History ==
The Kyrgyz community that lives in Ulupamir of Erciş ilçe (district) in Van Province have paid particular attention to protect their language. As these people have been living here since 1980s, they sometimes are called as Kyrgyz of Van. There are approximately 5,000 people in this community. The historical background of these people is related to the Pamir region of Afghanistan. There is another Kyrgyz community living in Turkey. Another group of Kyrgyz people in Turkey moved either to Istanbul city or returned to the Pamir region in Afghanistan. In Bob Dylan's autobiography, Chronicles: Volume One, Dylan wrote that his paternal grandmother's maiden name was Kirghiz and her family originated from the Kağızman district of Kars Province in northeastern Turkey.

== Tribes ==
Although most of the Kyrgyz tribes (boy in Turkish) in Istanbul city, Turkey, Ulupamir village is significantly important in terms of density of Kyrgyz people that live here. There are many similarities between these people and Kyrgyz people of Kyrgyzstan in terms of their culture. Despite the fact, Kyrgyz community of Turkey has been also affected by the local population of Turkey so that their language is slightly different from the language of Kyrgyz in Kyrgyzstan.

== Association ==
The largest association of Kyrgyz people in Turkey is Kyrgyz Turks Culture and Solidarity Association.
