= Demographics of Sabah =

Historical population
Year	Pop.	±%
1970	653,604	—
1980	955,712	+46.2%
1991	1,734,685	+81.5%
2000	2,468,246	+42.3%
2010	3,117,405	+26.3%
2020	3,418,785	+9.7%
Note: Include Labuan in 1970. Source: Malaysian Population Statistics

Sabah is the third most populous state in Malaysia, with a population of 3,418,785 according to the 2020 Malaysian census. It also has the highest non-citizen population, at 810,443. Although Malaysia is one of the least densely populated countries in Asia, Sabah is particularly sparsely populated. Most of the population is concentrated along coastal areas, with towns and urban centres seeing the most population growth.

The population of Sabah in 1970 was 653,604, with both the state and its neighbour Sarawak having about the same number of foreign nationals. In 1980, the state experienced a sharp rise in population with the arrival of almost a million refugees fleeing the Moro conflict in the neighbouring southern Philippines. Around the same time, large numbers of legal workers from both Indonesia and the Philippines also arrived in Sabah, drawn by the economic boom in its primary sector. Malayising policies enacted under Mustapha Harun further lowered Sabah's Christian Kadazan-Dusun demographic dominance other than these factors. In 1992, Sabah's population increased to over 1,734,685, then to 2,468,246 in 2000. By 2010, this grew to 3,117,405. Sabah has 900,000 registered migrant workers in agriculture, plantations, construction, services, and domestic work. While the total number of illegal immigrants (including refugees) is predicted to be more than one million, (Note: As Malaysia is not a signatory of the 1951 UN Refugee Convention, this total is predicted to be more than one million. One possible explanation for this high figure is the controversial naturalisation of illegal immigrants for political reasons. Malaysia maintains that all new arrivals are illegal immigrants rather than refugees.) most of these people are believed to have been categorised as "other bumiputera" in national statistics. Sabah has also seen an increase in the number of expatriates, mostly from China, Taiwan, South Korea, Japan, Australia, and Europe. In the near term, the population is expected to grow from increasing interracial marriages and migration.

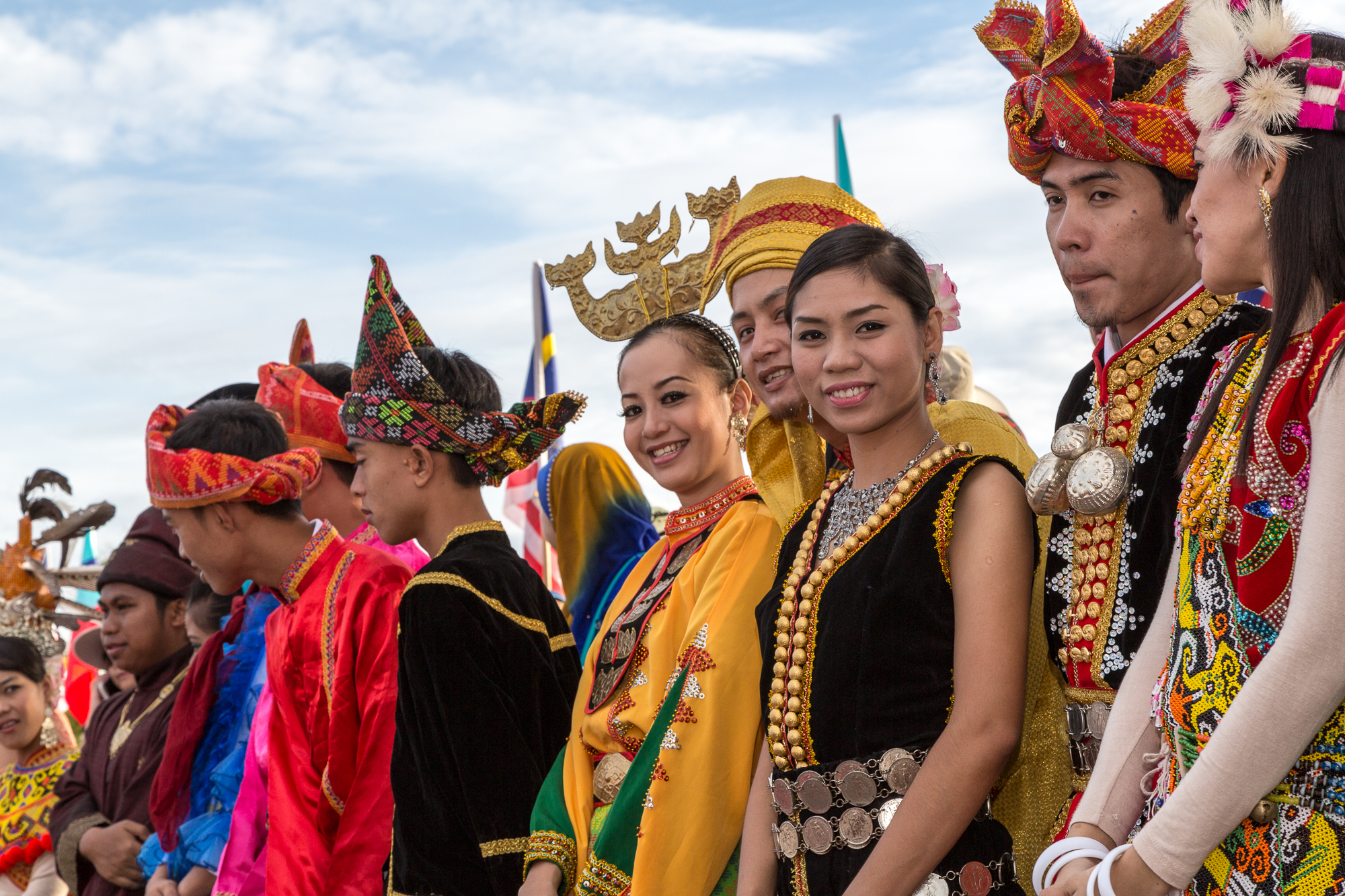
Ethnic groups of Sabah in their respective traditional dress

People from Sabah are called Sabahans and generally identify themselves as such. Sabah is home to an estimated 42 ethnic groups, and over 200 distinct sub-ethnic groups each with their own language, culture, and spiritual beliefs. The coastal and lowland areas are inhabited mostly by the Bajau, Bisaya, Bruneian Malay, Bugis, Illanun, Kedayan, and Suluk. These groups traditionally worked as fishermen and farmers. Both the lowland and highland areas in the interior are inhabited mostly by the Kadazan, Dusun, Murut, Rungus, Paitan, and Lun Bawang (or Lun Dayeh) and their sub-groups. These groups traditionally worked as farmers and hunters. The term bumiputera (lit. 'son of the soil') is used in Malaysia to refer to those of Malay and indigenous descent. This demographic generally enjoys special privileges in education, employment, finance, and politics. Within the bumiputera demographic, the term Orang Asal refers to just those of aboriginal tribes, excluding the Malays who are termed bumiputera which also mean indigenous.

The three largest indigenous groups in Sabah are the Kadazan-Dusun, Bajau, and Murut. These are followed by the Bruneian Malays, Suluk, and others. Citizens of Chinese descent make up the majority of the non-Bumiputera population.

== Ethnic groups ==
=== Kadazan-Dusun ===
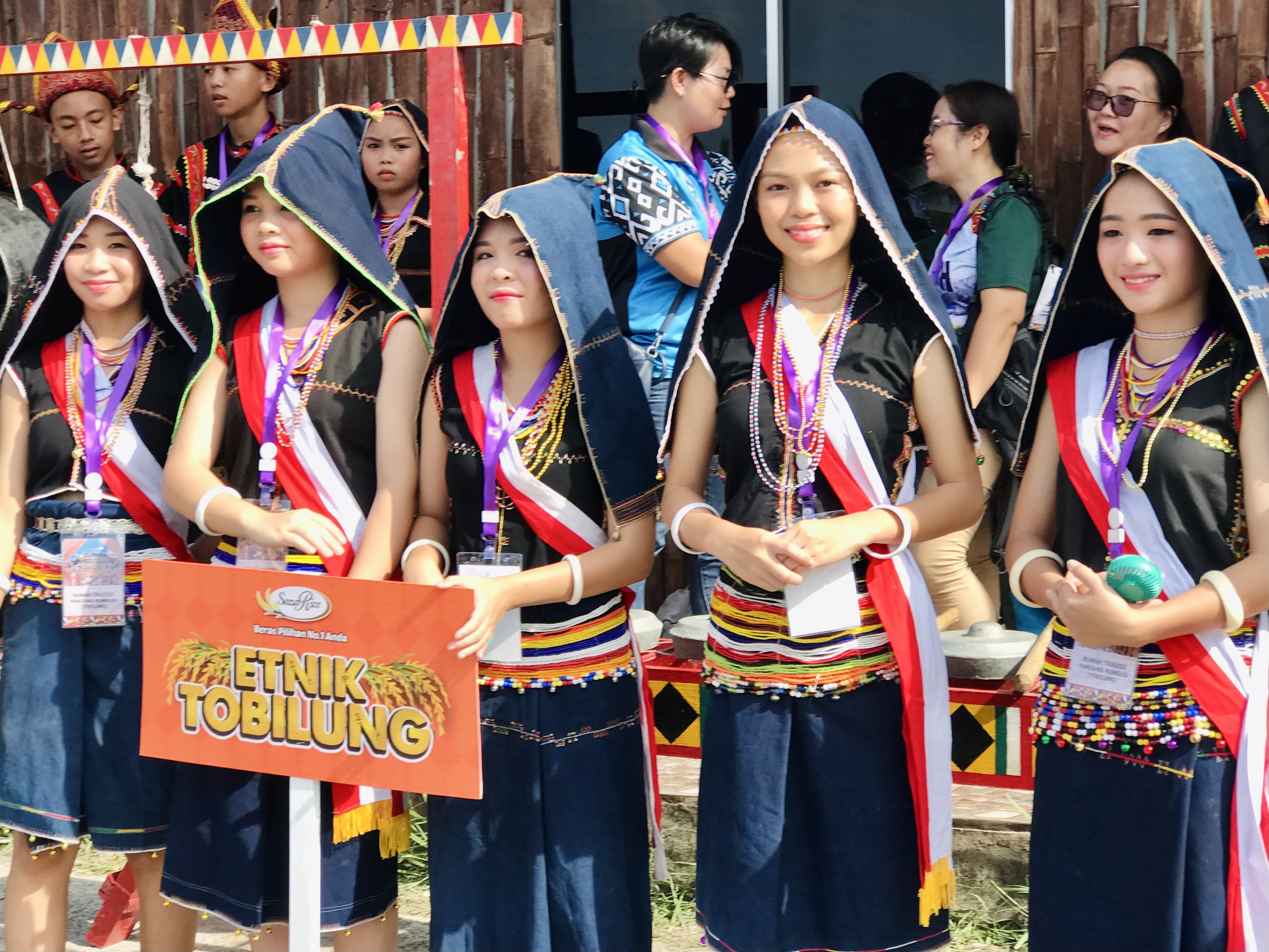
Kadazan-Dusun sub-group of Tobilung Dusun women in their traditional dress

The Kadazan-Dusun is the largest indigenous group in Sabah, comprising the blending of the Kadazan and Dusun peoples and their 40 sub-groups. Each sub-group has a different (though largely mutually intelligible) language and tradition. Although the term Kadazan-Dusun is primarily used to collectively refer to the two groups as a whole, it also sometimes includes other groups like the Murut, Orang Sungai, Rungus, Tidong, and Lun Bawang/Lun Dayeh peoples. These other ethnic groups also identify as "other bumiputera".

Today, the Kadazan reside mainly in urban areas, whereas the Dusun prefer the hills and upland valleys. The Kadazan are mostly settled in the areas around Penampang, Putatan, Papar, Membakut, and Beaufort, whereas the Dusun are mostly concentrated in the areas of Kota Kinabalu, Kuala Penyu, Tuaran, Ranau, Tambunan, Telupid, Keningau, Kota Belud, Kota Marudu, and Beluran. The Kadazan-Dusun were once known for their headhunting practices as well for their skills as farmers, hunters, and river fisherfolk.

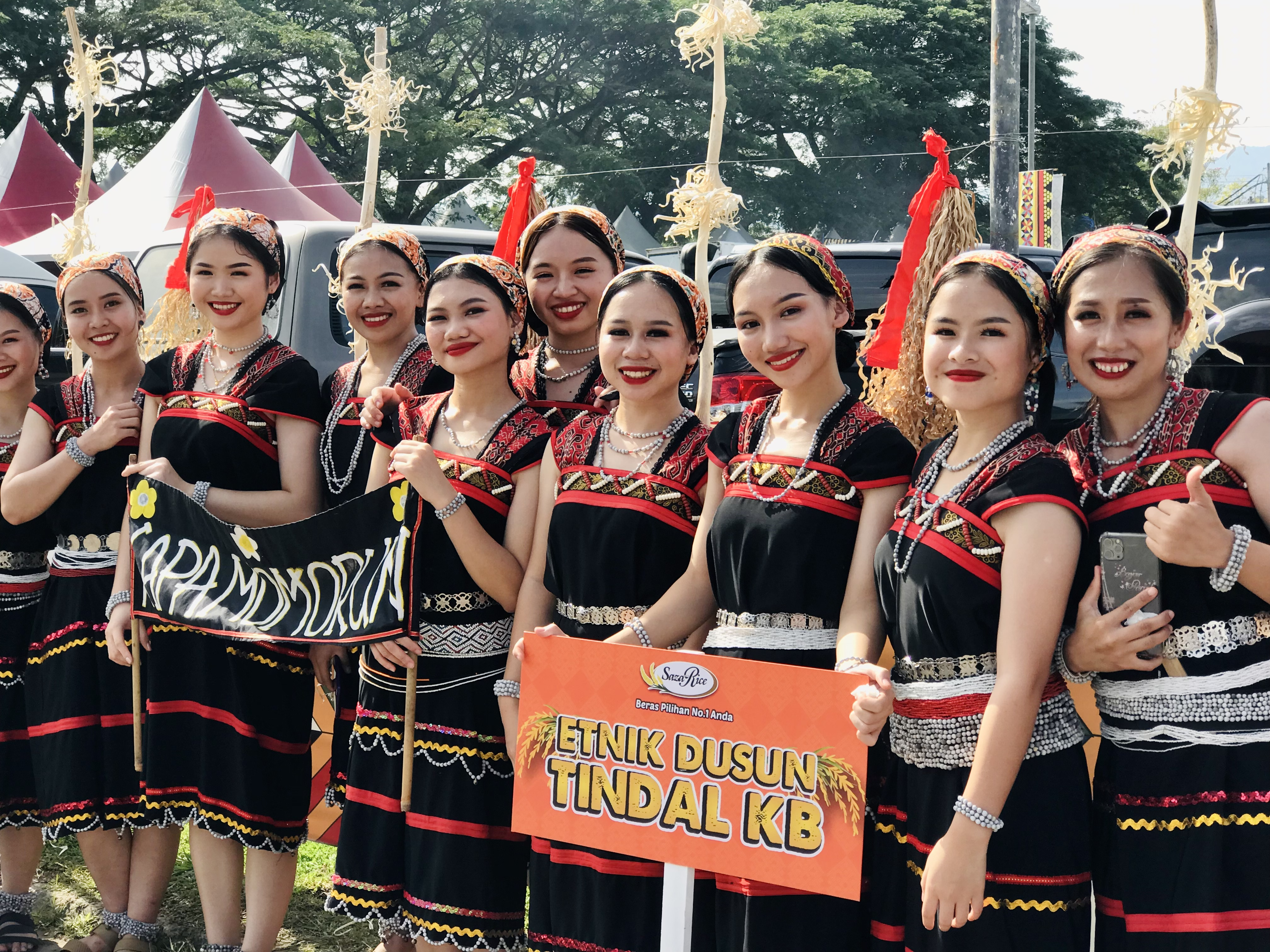
Tindal Dusuns of Kota Belud District

The Kadazan once lived in longhouses, while the Dusun lived in single traditional houses (although some also lived in longhouses). As both peoples are traditionally rice farmers, they celebrate an annual harvest festival known as the Kaamatan. The Kadazan-Dusun community has a belief that their ancestors come from the Nunuk Ragang (a red banyan tree). Located not far from the tree are the two rivers Liwagu and Gelibang, which became the route through which their community spread throughout the interior of Sabah.

=== Bajau ===
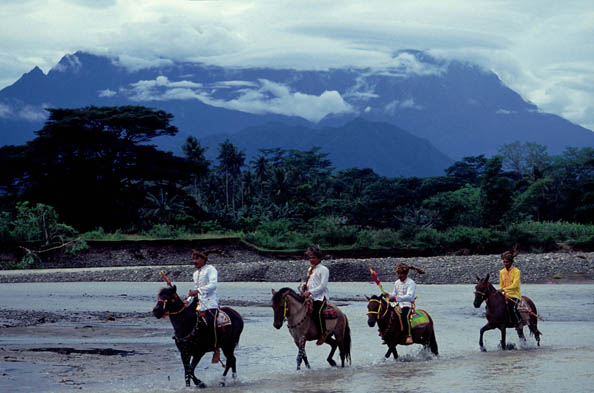
West Coast Bajau horsemen in Kota Belud District, with a background of Mount Kinabalu behind

The second largest indigenous group of Sabah is the Bajau. The Bajaus in Sabah are generally divided into two main groups: the West Coast and East Coast. The West Coast Bajau generally lived in land and were known for their traditional horse culture. They mostly settled the area from Kota Belud, Kota Kinabalu, Tuaran, and Papar. The East Coast Bajau mostly spend their lives in the sea and settled around the area of Semporna, Lahad Datu, and Kunak; they also hold their annual regatta lepa festival.

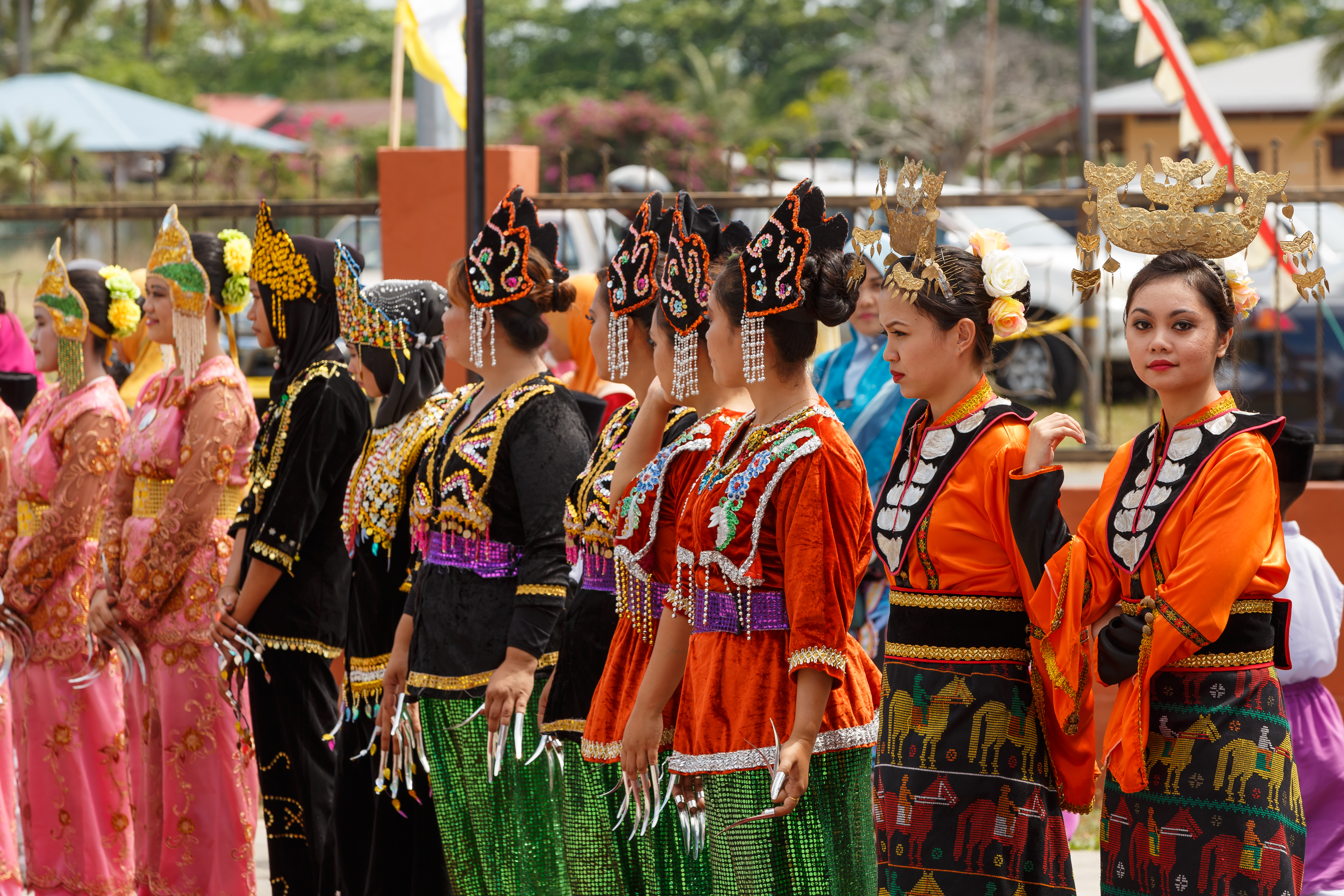
East Coast Bajau girls with their traditional dress. (Including in this image are West Coast Bajau girls on the right)

Once known as seafarers, the West Coast Bajau started to learn farming and cattle rearing since their migration from the Philippine archipelago a long time ago. Their skills in horsemanship are well known locally, and they engage in horsemanship activities on their festive occasions, during which riders dress in colourful traditional costumes. On the other hand, the East Coast Bajau still live as they traditionally have, with fishing having become their main source of income. Most lived in stilt water villages, and some spend most of their lives in their boat. The East Coast Bajau are also known as good divers and can spend more than five minutes in the waters without using an oxygen tank.

=== Murut ===
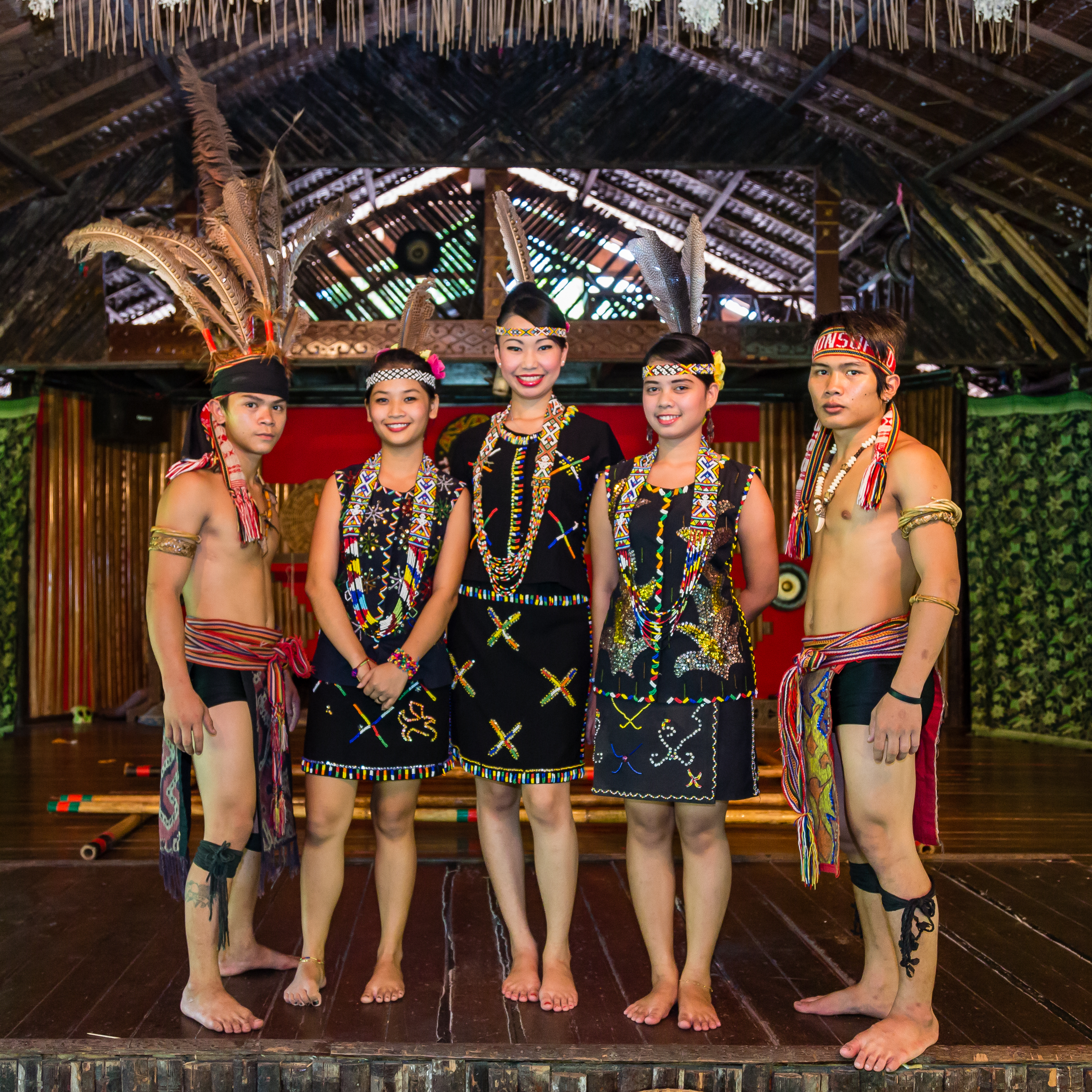
Muruts in their traditional dress

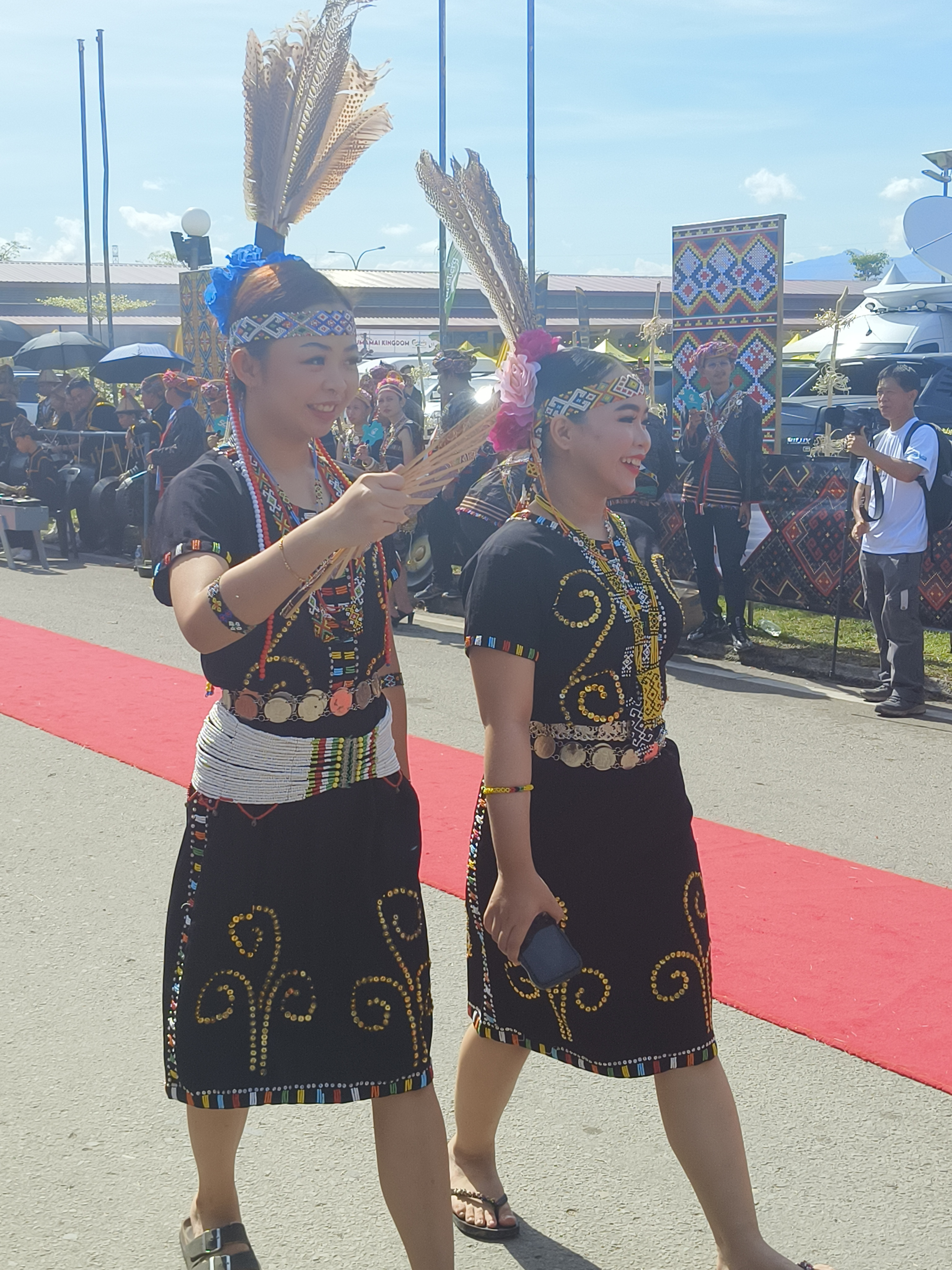
Two Murut women during Sabah's Kaamatan festival at KDCA, Penampang District

The Muruts are the third largest indigenous group of Sabah, settling the areas around Keningau, Tenom, Nabawan, Pensiangan, and along the river areas of Sapulut, Padas, and Kinabatangan. Like the Kadazan-Dusun, they were once known for their headhunting practice and now are farmers and hunters. Traditionally, the Muruts lived in longhouses; today, Muruts in north Sabah still live in longhouses, but most others have adopted modern dwellings. The Muruts have a great knowledge of botanical healers, with each of their communities having its own herbalist who can attend to illnesses such as diarrhoea, diabetes, and high blood pressure. Since the abolishment of headhunting by the British, many Muruts served as police and soldiers for the British. This has been maintained until today, with many Muruts serving in the Malaysian Armed Forces. Similar to the Kadazan-Dusun, the Muruts also celebrate a harvest festival called Kalimaran.

=== Melayu, Melayu Brunei, and Kedayan ===
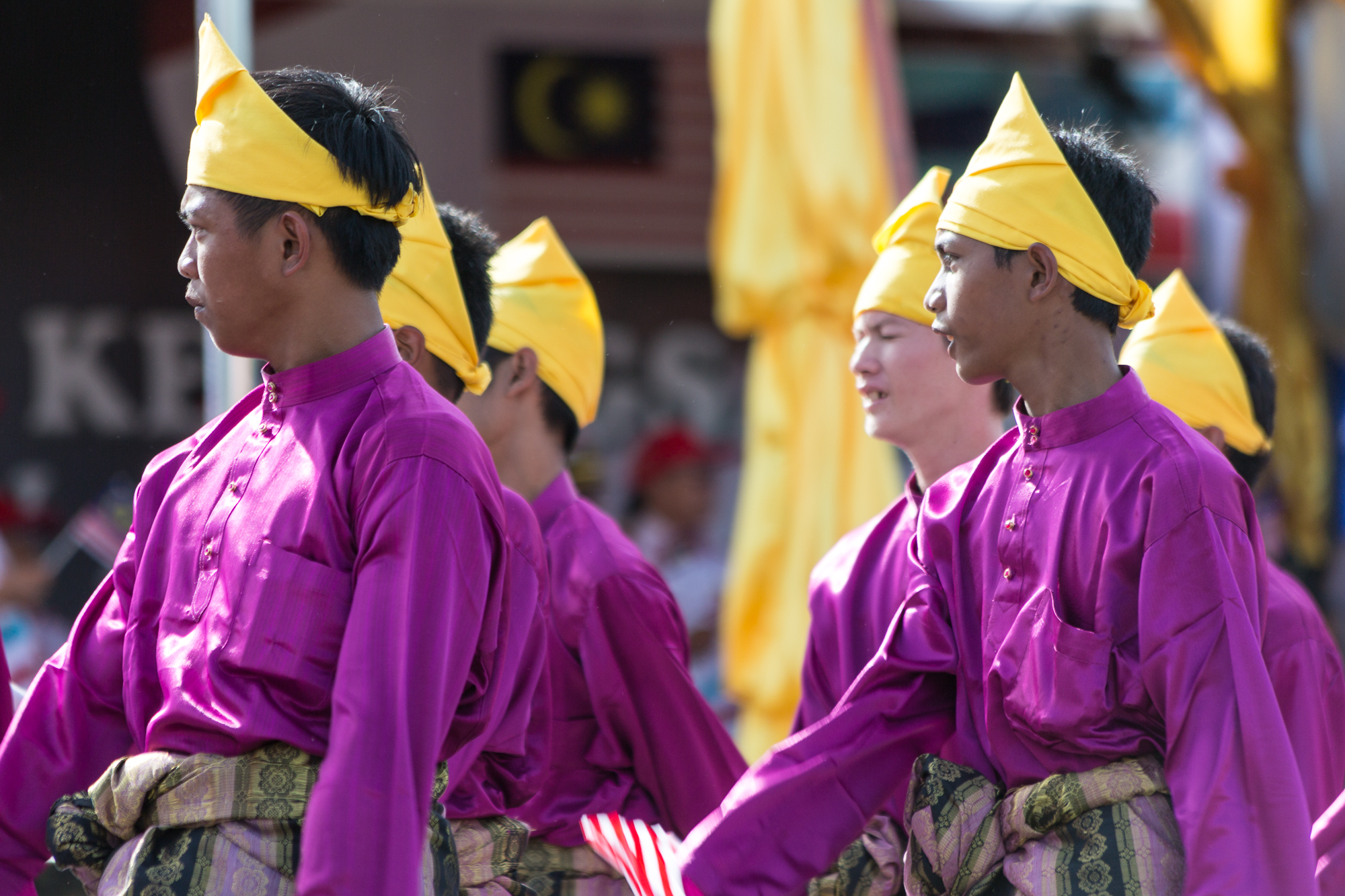
Brunei Malays in their traditional dress of Baju Melayu during a parade in Sabah

The traditional Malays in Sabah are the Bruneian Malays, who mostly inhabit the area in the southwest coast. They mostly settled in Beaufort, Sipitang, Kuala Penyu, and Papar. Their migration to northern Borneo was noticeable during the rule of the Sultanate of Brunei in the 1400s. However, although the Bruneians are Malays, their culture and language slightly differ from the majority of Peninsular Malays.

The Cocos Malays and Kedayan are also included in this group, together with the recent Malays who migrated from Peninsular Malaysia and Sarawak, as Malays are defined by the Malaysian Constitution as those who are Muslim, speak Malay, and conform to Malay customs.

=== Suluk ===
The Suluks settled around the east coast of Sabah, mainly in Sandakan, Semporna, and Lahad Datu. Together with the Bajaus and Illanuns, their migration from the Sulu Archipelago began during the rule of the Sultanate of Sulu. Many are believed to have fled the slave trade in the Sulu Archipelago and Spanish oppression; some are even descendants of a Sulu princess (Dayang-Dayang) who fled from the sultan of Sulu when he tried to make the princess his wife. The indigenous Suluks are different from the recently arrived Tausug immigrants from the Philippines as they have embraced the multiculturalism in northern Borneo. Due to the purported racism and discrimination faced by indigenous Suluks—triggered mostly by illegal immigration, as well as militants from Sulu who are mostly Tausugs from the Philippines—indigenous Suluks prefer to be distinguished and differentiated from the Tausugs in the Philippines.

=== Chinese ===
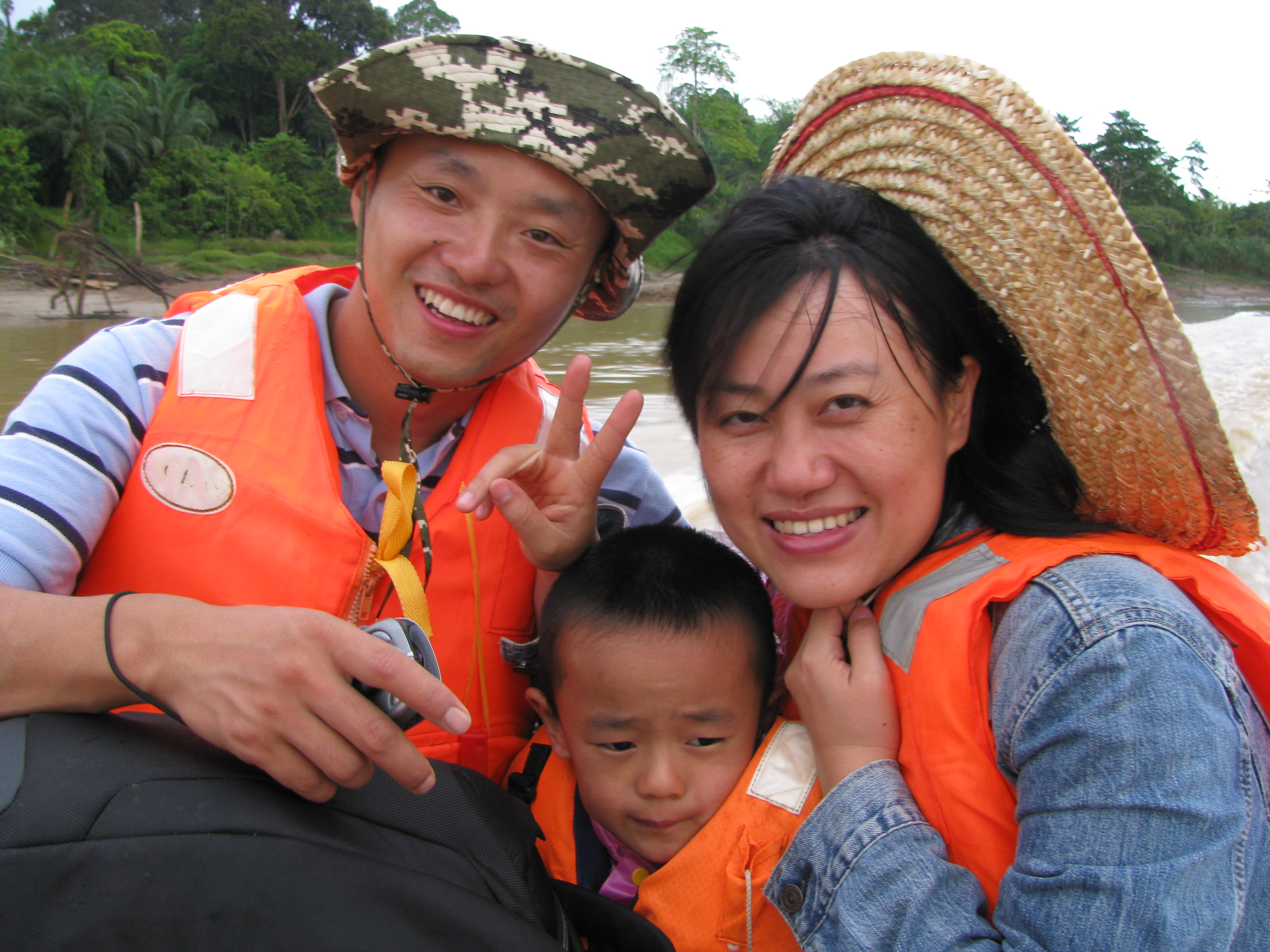
A happy Chinese family in Sabah

Chinese form the largest non-indigenous group in Sabah, many of whom arrived to northern Borneo before the British, as shown in both Brunei and Sulu sultanates records and British records. The earliest documentation of Chinese settlement in Sabah dates back to the 7th century, on the banks of the Kinabatangan River. However, the links between northern Borneo and China could be much longer, since the Han dynasty.

The migration of Chinese to northern Borneo saw a significant increase following the establishment of the North Borneo Chartered Company in 1881. At the time, the British considered the native populations as being too small in number to boost the North Borneo economy. Until this day, the Chinese are very important to the state economy, engaging in business-related activities.

The Chinese in Sabah can be divided into three main groups: Hakka, Cantonese, and Hokkien. The Hakka form the majority of Chinese in Sabah, followed by the Cantonese and Hokkien. There is also a community of northern Chinese in the state, most of whom identify as Tianjin ren (people from Tianjin). All the Chinese community are united under the Sabah United Chinese Chambers of Commerce (SUCC), an organisation that promotes national unity and continuous contribution towards the state economy.

=== Sino-Native ===
The Sino-Native community in Sabah, often referred to as Sino, is a cultural group that emerged from intermarriages between the Chinese community and indigenous peoples such as the Kadazan-Dusun, Murut and others. These intermarriages date back to the mid-18th century and have resulted in distinct sub-groups like Sino-Kadazan, Sino-Dusun and Sino-Murut, each reflecting a fusion of Chinese and local traditions. This blending of cultures is evident in various aspects of their lives, including language, cuisine, customs, and religious practices.

Today, the Sino-Native community continues to maintain a distinct cultural identity shaped by both Chinese and indigenous heritage. Major celebrations, including Chinese New Year and the Kaamatan Festival, may incorporate customs and practices from both traditions. For example, some Sino households include indigenous dishes such as Linopot and sambal Tuhau alongside traditional Chinese New Year foods.

=== Other bumiputeras ===
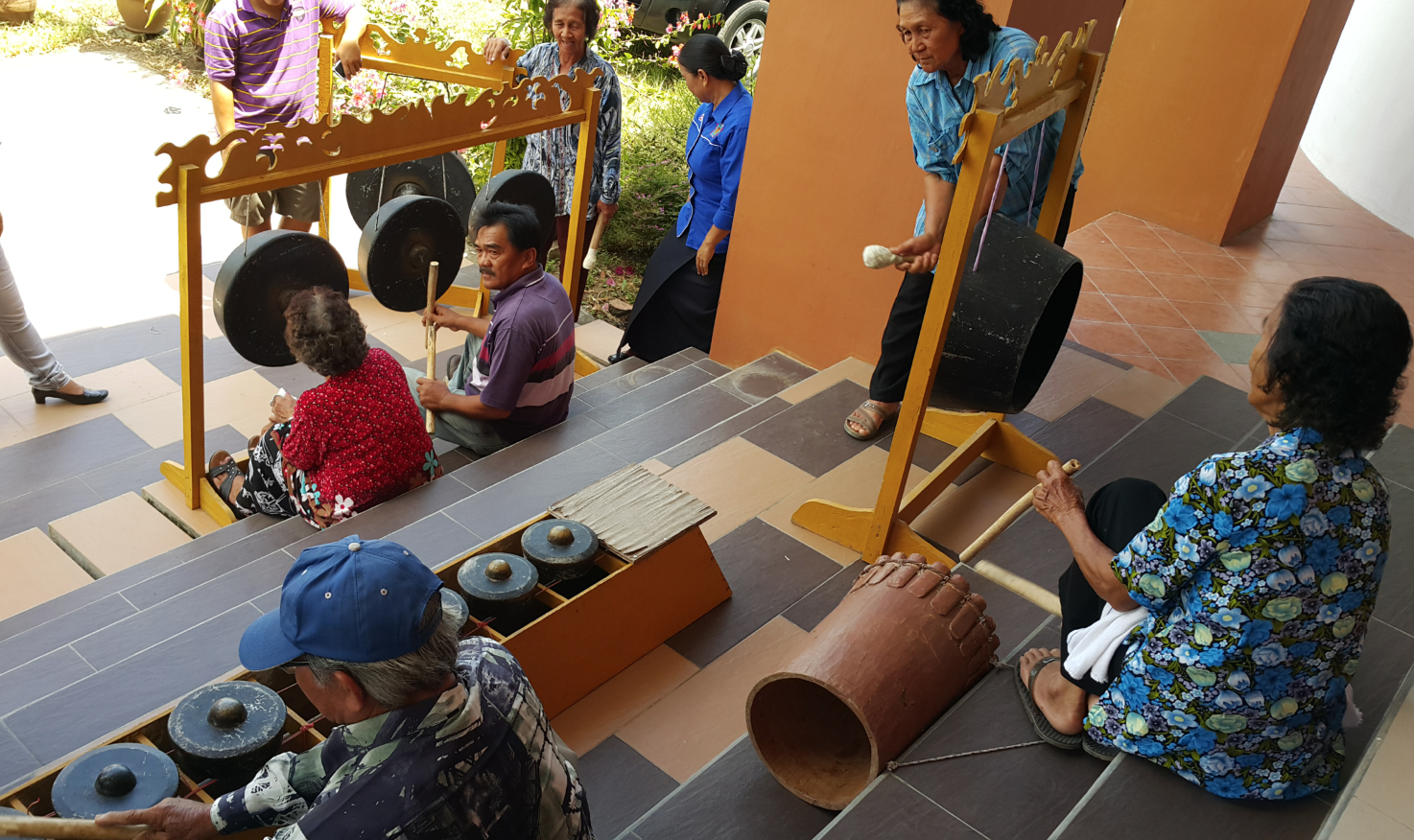
Lun Bawang in Sabah playing their musical instruments, kulintangan and agung

Sabah also has other minority indigenous ethnic groups, other than the four largest indigenous groups (Kadazan-Dusun, Bajau, Brunei Malays, and Murut). These include other Dusun groups such as the Bonggi, Inokang, Kimaragang, Kwijau, Liwan, Lotud, Minokok, Sonsogon, Tagahas, Tatana, Tindal and Tobilung, the Rungus, Paitanic group such as Orang Sungei, Rumanau, Tombonuo and Paitanic Dusuns, Iranun, Lun Bawang, Lundayeh, Kedayan, Iban, Bisaya, Kokos, Tidung, Ida'an, and Bajau sub-groups such as the Binadan, Kagayan, Ubian, and Sea Bajau.

Still, the ethnic identification is fluid—some individuals might identify as belonging to one of the major ethnic groups in Sabah (such as the Rungus and Orang Sungei being sub-ethnics of Kadazan-Dusun, or the Kedayan and Kokos being sub-ethnics of Malay), while others insist on identifying as a separate ethnic group.

The categorisation under the term "other bumiputeras" for official usage has brought some controversy. For example, there was speculation that the term was misused to include counting Filipino and Indonesian immigrants who were naturalised either through some connivance elements in state bureaucracy or fraudulent documents.

=== Distribution by ethnicities ===
Population of Sabah by ethnic group
Ethnicity	1991		2000		2010		2020	
Ethnicity	Population (1991 census)	Percentage	Population (2000 census)	Percentage	Population (2010 census)	Percentage	Population (2020 census)	Percentage
Kadazan-Dusun	321,834	18.6%	458,768	18.6%	555,647	17.8%	660,777	19.3%
Bajau	203,457	11.7%	330,996	13.4%	426,672	13.7%	565,499	16.5%
Malay	106,740	6.2%	294,833	11.9%	178,029	5.7%	307,494	9.0%
Murut	50,255	2.9%	80,872	3.3%	100,631	3.2%	106,484	3.1%
Other bumiputeras	255,555	14.7%	374,388	15.2%	640,964	20.6%	673,233	19.7%
Subtotal (bumiputera)	937,841	54.1%	1,539,857	62.4%	1,911,943	61.3%	2,313,471	67.7%
Chinese	200,056	11.5%	254,528	10.3%	284,049	9.1%	248,920	7.3%
Indian	—N/a	—N/a	—N/a	—N/a	7,171	0.2%	5,962	0.2%
Others	171,613	9.9%	120,894	4.9%	47,052	1.5%	39,989	1.2%
Subtotal (Malaysian citizens)	1,309,510	75.5%	1,915,279	77.6%	2,250,215	72.2%	2,608,342	76.3%
Non-Malaysian citizens	425,175	24.5%	552,967	22.4%	867,190	27.8%	810,443	23.7%
Total	1,734,685	100%	2,468,246	100%	3,117,405	100%	3,418,785	100%

Distribution of ethnic groups in Sabah by state constituencies (2020 census)

Malay

Kadazan-Dusun

Bajau

Murut

Chinese

Non-Malaysian, including illegal immigrants and refugees

== Religion ==
Religion in Sabah (2020)
Religion	Percent
Islam	69.6%
Christianity	24.7%
Buddhism	5.1%
Unknown	0.1%
No religion	0.1%
Others	0.1%
Hinduism	0.1%

Prior to the arrival of Islam and Christianity, the indigenous peoples of North Borneo mainly practised animism and paganism. Islam arrived in the 10th century on the west coast of Borneo, following the conversion of the first ruler of Brunei into Islam. In addition, Islamic teachings spread from Sulu and Sulawesi into the coastal areas of eastern Borneo. Christianity arrived in the 14th century, first through the Italian Odoric of Pordenone around 1322, and later, in 1567, North Borneo received another two Jesuit missionaries from the Kingdom of Portugal. Another two Franciscan missionaries were dispatched from the Spanish East Indies in 1587. In 1687, a Theatine missionary named Antonino Ventimiglia was commissioned by Pope Innocent XI to preach Christianity in Borneo. By the end of the 19th century, a Spanish mariner and priest, Rev. Msgr. Carlos Cuarteroni, successfully established the first Catholic mission, although at the time the British had already established their presence on the island of Labuan. Meanwhile, Buddhism, Taoism, and Chinese folk religions as well the Indian religions of Hinduism and Sikhism arrived as a result of the migration of Chinese and Indians to northern Borneo.

Following the amendments of the 1973 Sabah constitution by Chief Minister Mustapha Harun, Islam was declared the state religion of Sabah. However, the amendments are considered controversial, as they contradict the 20-point agreement that was agreed upon prior to the formation of Malaysia, which stated that there would be no state religion for North Borneo. It is believed that the amendments were made while ignoring the indigenous peoples. In 1960, the population of Muslims in Sabah was only 37.9%, with animists (33.3%), Christians (16.6%), and other religions (12.2%) constituting the remainder. However, following Mustapha Harun coming to power, the Muslim population suddenly began to increase rapidly. By 2010, the percentage of Muslims had increased to 65.4%, while Christians grew to 26.6% and Buddhists to 6.1%.

Religious sites in Sabah

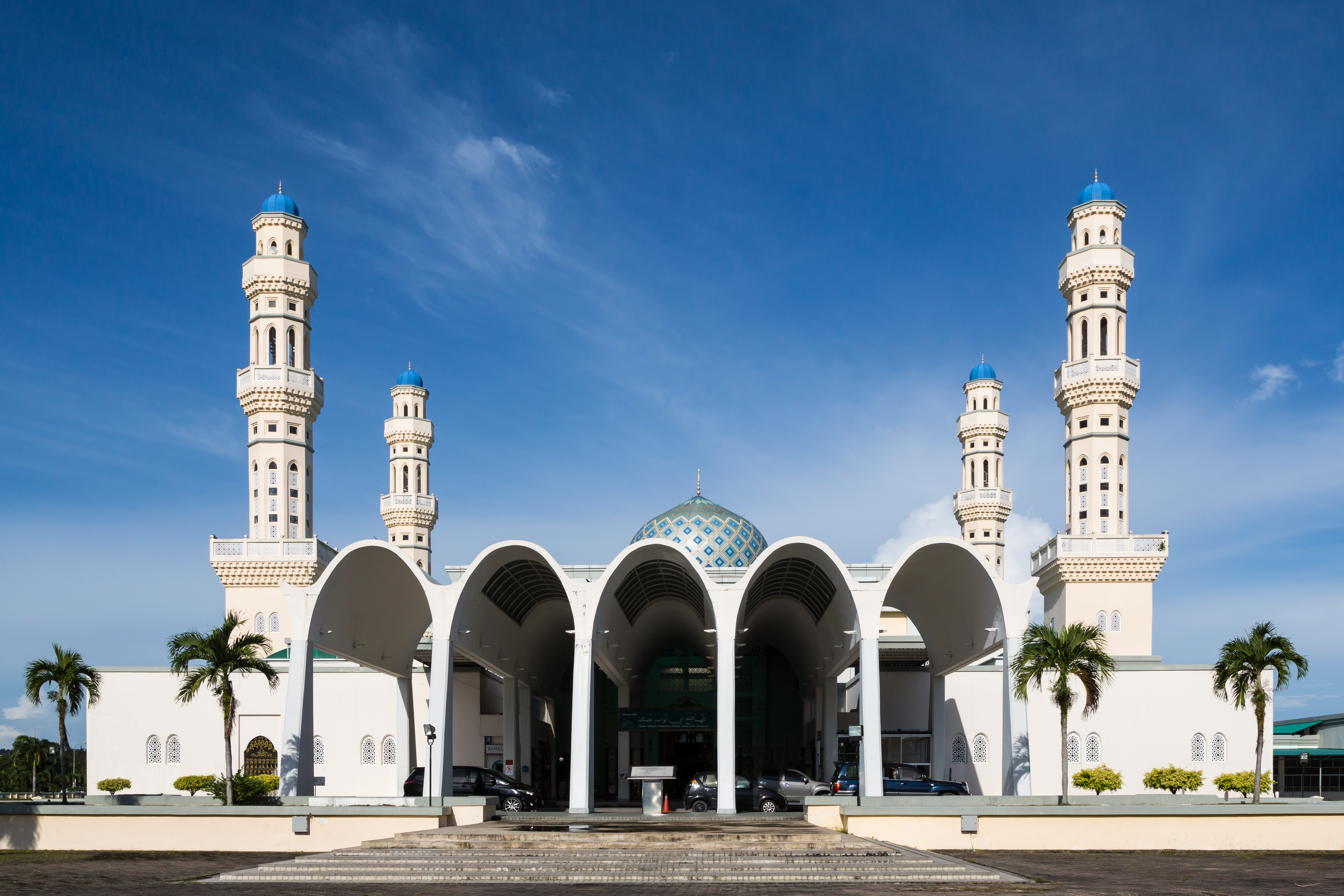
City Mosque

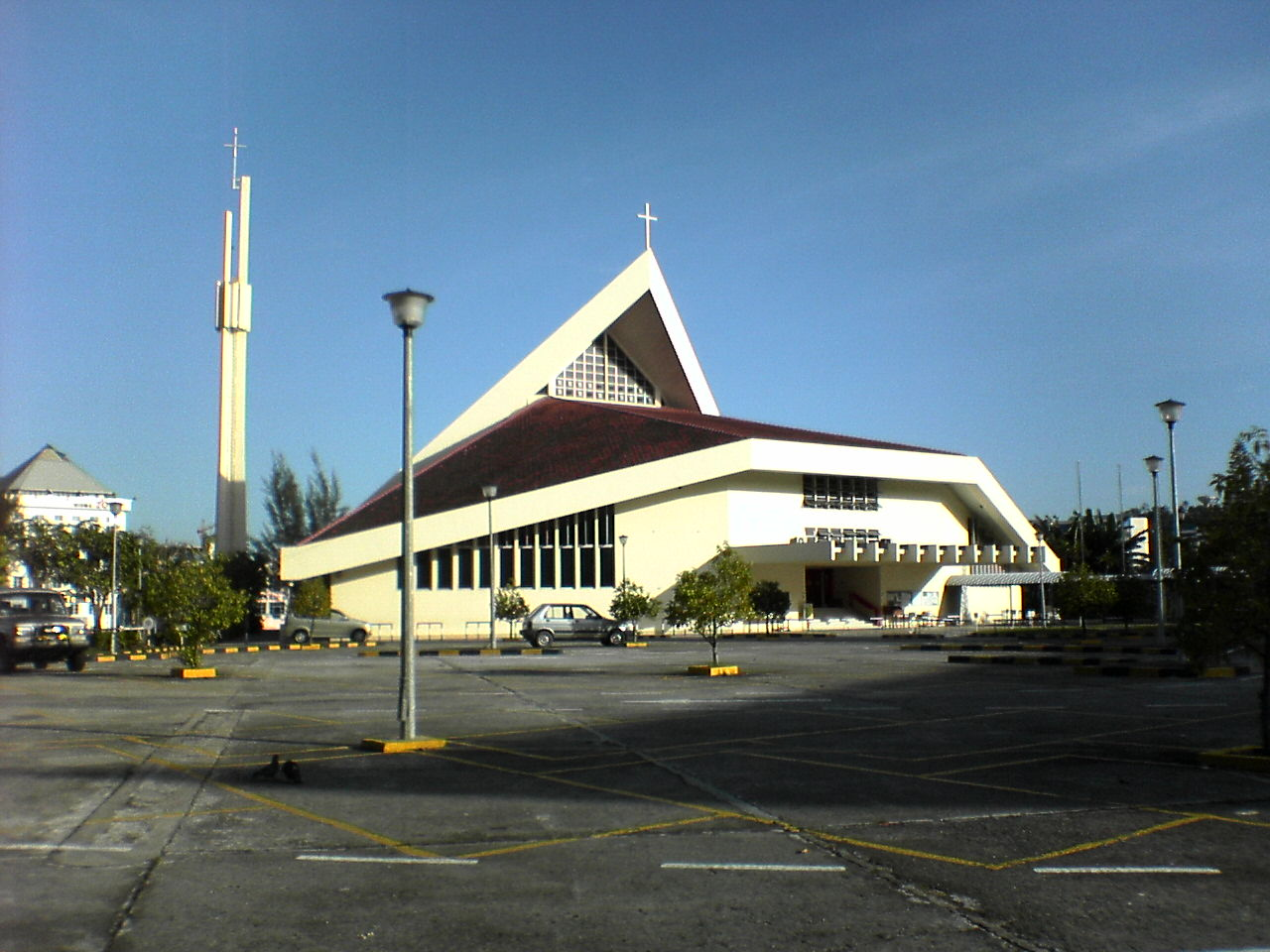
Sacred Heart Cathedral

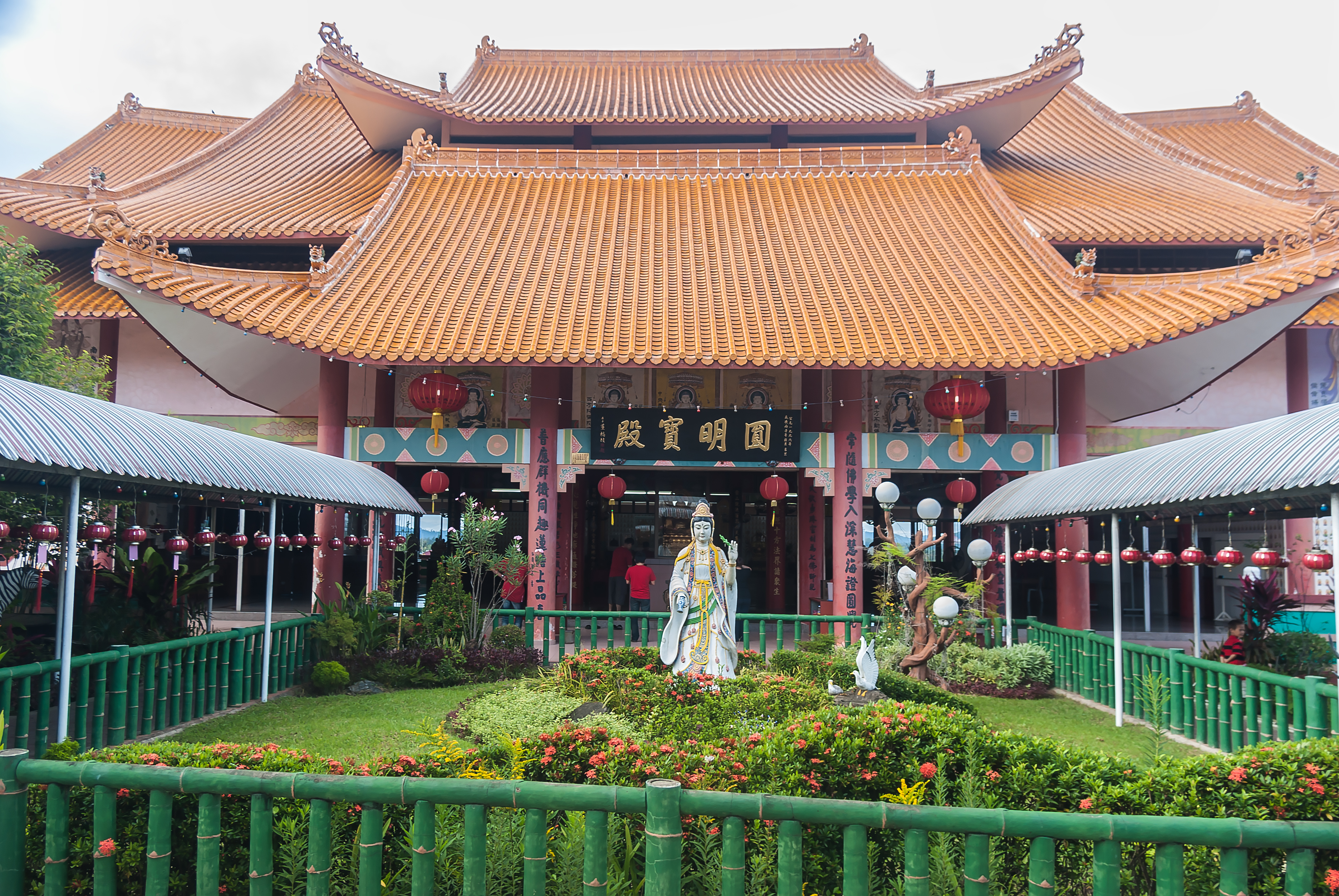
Pu Tuo Si Temple

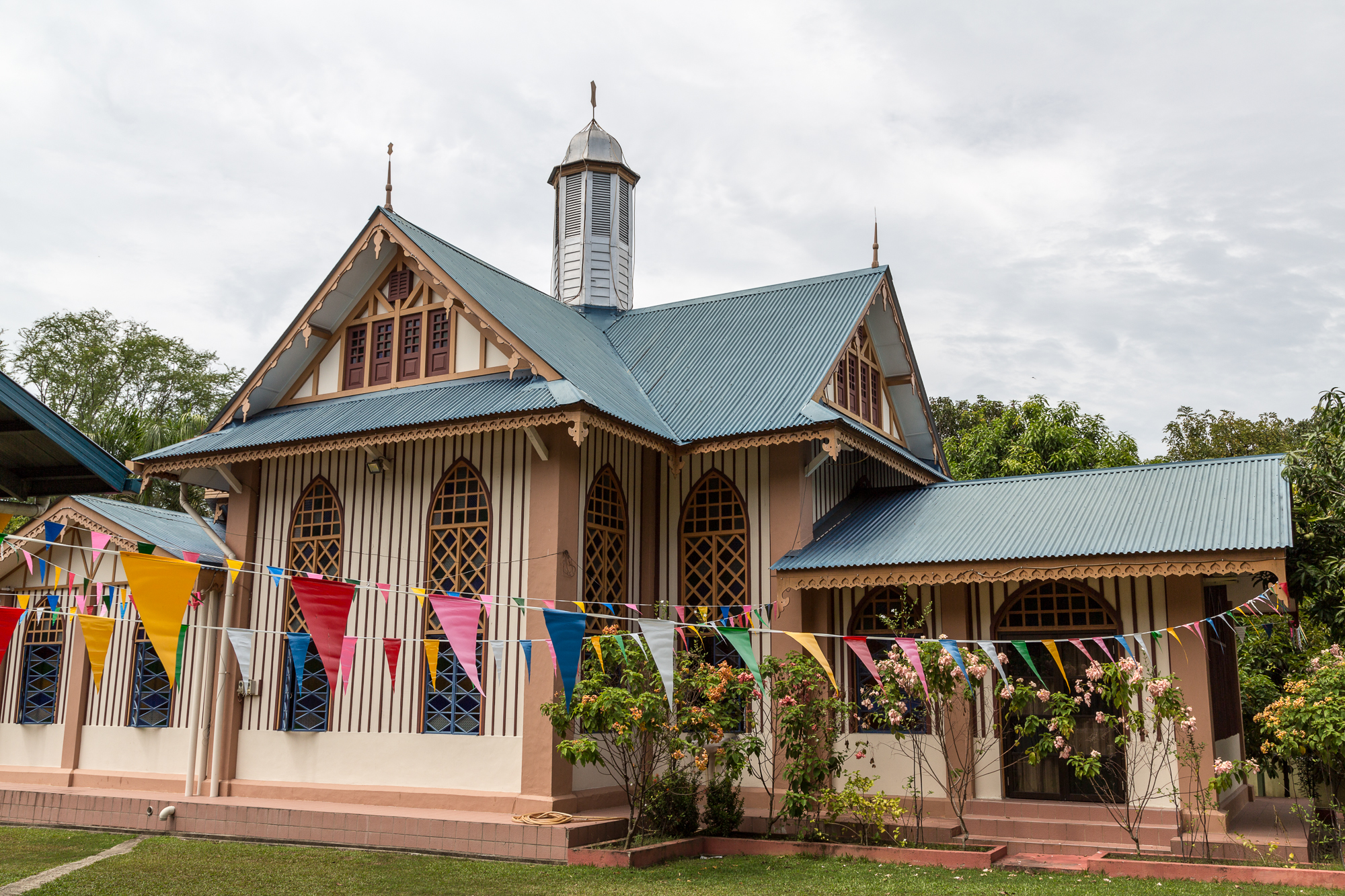
Gurudwara Sahib

Population and Housing Censuses figures show the approximate proportions of these religions. The significant increase in the Muslim population between 1980 and 2010 (almost half a million people for every 10 years) highlights the height of Project IC, an alleged demographic engineering program in Sabah.

Year	Islam	Buddhism	Christianity	Hinduism	Other religions	No religion or no information
1921*	31.8% (81,886)	—N/a	2.7% (6,980)	—N/a	65.5% (168,938)	—N/a
1931*	32.1% (86,713)	—N/a	3.9% (10,454)	—N/a	64.0% (173,056)	—N/a
1951*	34.5% (115,126)	—N/a	16.6% (29,052)	—N/a	56.8% (189,923)	—N/a
1960*	37.9% (172,324)	—N/a	16.6% (75,247)	—N/a	45.5% (206,850)	—N/a
1970	40.1% (260,945)	9.7% (63,313)	24.2% (157,422)	0%	14.5% (94,493)	11.5% (75,131)
1980	51.3% (487,627)	8.3% (78,868)	27.2% (258,606)	0.3% (2,896)	6.8% (65,078)	6.0% (57,481)
1991	62.2% (1,062,214)	7.4% (126,206)	27.6% (470,371)	0.2% (3,231)	0.2% (2,570)	2.5% (42,106)
2000	63.4% (1,564,734)	6.5% (161,244)	28.0% (690,455)	0.1% (2,715)	0.7% (17,932)	1.3% (31,166)
2010	65.4% (2,037,547)	6.0% (187,342)	26.7% (831,451)	0.1% (2,935)	0.2% (5,816)	1.7% (52,315)
2020	69.6% (2,379,216)	5.1% (173,241)	24.7% (843,734)	0.1% (4,948)	0.1% (3,772)	0.4% (13,874)
*1921-1960 census is from North Borneo

=== Mass conversion and issues with freedom of religion ===
Starting in the colonial period, various Christian groups from the West actively evangelised the indigenous people of North Borneo as part of an effort to improve the living standards of the natives and eradicate tribal wars, headhunting, and excessive alcohol consumption. However, after colonial independence—and especially during the helm of Sabah's third chief minister, Mustapha Harun—Christian groups were involved in a dispute with Mustapha over alleged discrimination, bias, and unfair treatment towards them.

Under Mustapha's political party, United Sabah National Organisation (USNO), large-scale Islamisation was carried out by the United Sabah Islamic Association (USIA). The organisation expelled a number of Christian missionary workers, converted elite politicians, and carried out mass conversion of animist villagers and some older Chinese generations in exchange for their citizenship, office positions, or cash rewards. This was followed by an influx of Muslim migrants—Filipino refugees from Mindanao and Indonesian immigrants from Sulawesi—who were harboured to increase the local Muslim populations. These immigrants were eventually integrated into the community and naturalised as Sabahan and Malaysian via an alleged program called Project IC.

After the fall of USNO, BERJAYA adopted "multi-racial principles" which won the vote from non-Muslims. However, the party began to adopt an Islamic vision with the establishment of Majlis Ugama Islam Sabah (MUIS). The conversion of indigenous villagers became rampant at the time. This interference in indigenous faith and rituals led to dwindling support from non-Muslims, and thus to the fall of BERJAYA. Then, when the Sabah administration was taken over by a non-Muslim party, PBS, many false warnings regarding the threat to Islam were spread amongst the people in order to disrupt harmony and re-establish the position of the Muslim-dominated parties. Peninsular Malaysia politicians were brought in to strategise the downfall of PBS by any means (including Project IC) in the pretense of protecting Islam.

Moreover, since the controversial amendments of the 1973 constitution, Sabah faced more cases of mass religious conversion. This led to highly controversial issues, such as when Christian or pagan indigenous natives were instead identified as Muslim during their applications for identity cards. This confusion was partly due to federal authorities in Peninsular Malaysia assuming that the usage of "bin" and "binti" in the birth certificates of indigenous non-Muslim Sabahans indicated their profession to Islam. However, the issue originated from reckless officers who manipulated the ignorance of indigenous natives when registering the births of their newborn babies, by adding "bin" or "binti" into the babies' names. Additionally, there are frequent reports of villagers who were tricked into conversion by certain non-governmental organisations from the Peninsular Malaysia, as well the conversion of students in schools by teachers from the Peninsular without their parents' knowledge and consent.

While any non-Muslims in the state who want to convert to Islam can be easily accepted by the state law, any Muslims who wish to leave their religion will be detained in the state Islamic Rehabilitation Centre until they repent or are jailed for up to 36 months (3 years). A bid for the establishment of Sabah's first Christian radio also went unheeded by the federal government communication ministry until it was brought up to court. In addition, religious zealotry and intolerance from certain Muslim hardcore groups in Peninsular Malaysia has started to affect the cultural and religious diversity in Sabah. However, the federal government has denied connection with the controversial conversions and said that it is not the policy of the government to force someone to change their religion. Prior to this, there were frequent calls to the government to restore the freedom of religion in the state and prevent religious tensions from damaging peace and harmony.

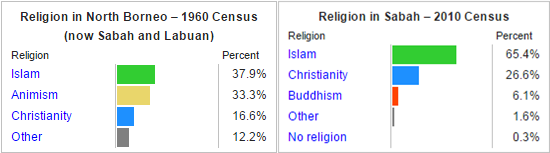
Religion comparison of North Borneo (1960) and Sabah (2010) after undergoing controversial large-scale mass conversions.

== Languages ==
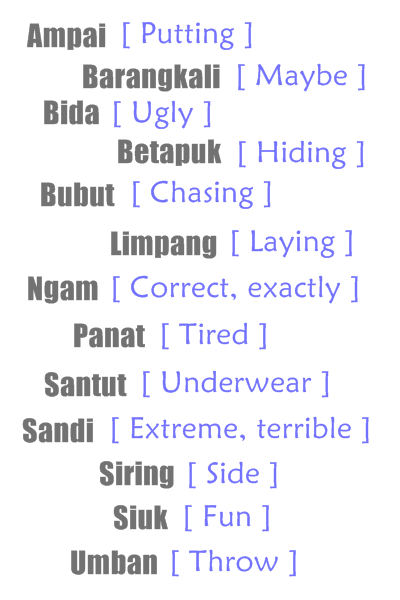
Some examples of Sabahan language slang words accompanied by their English translations.

The indigenous languages of Sabah can be divided into four language families: Dusunic, Murutic, Paitanic, and Sama–Bajau. Studies suggest that the only truly Bornean languages spoken in Sabah are those belonging to the Dusunic, Murutic, and Paitanic language families, while the Sama–Bajau languages originate from the southern Philippines.

Dusunic is the largest of the four families. It comprises the Kadazan Dusun language, which has dialects spread throughout the districts of Papar, Penampang, Kota Kinabalu, Tuaran, Ranau, Tambunan, and Keningau. It is followed by the Murutic languages of southern Sabah, which are spoken mainly in Keningau, Tenom, Nabawan, and Pensiangan. The Paitanic languages are spoken in the areas along the east coast rivers of Paitan, Kinabatangan, and Segama. The Sama–Bajau are concentrated along parts of the West and East Coasts.

Malay is taught as the main language for conversation across different ethnicities in the state, although Sabahan creole is different from Sarawak Malay and Peninsular Malay. Sabah has its own slang in Malay that originates from indigenous words, Brunei Malay, Bajau, Suluk, Dusun, and Indonesian.

The large Chinese minority in Sabah are mostly of the Hakka subgroup. As such, the Hakka dialect is the most commonly spoken Chinese dialect in the state. There are also significant minorities speaking other dialects, particular Cantonese and Hokkien. Additionally, as Chinese schools in Malaysia use Mandarin as the language of instruction, many Chinese Sabahans are also proficient in Mandarin, albeit a "Malaysianised" form of it. Zamboangueño, a Spanish-based creole language and dialect of Chavacano, spread into one village of Sabah in Semporna prior to the migration of people from the southern Philippines.

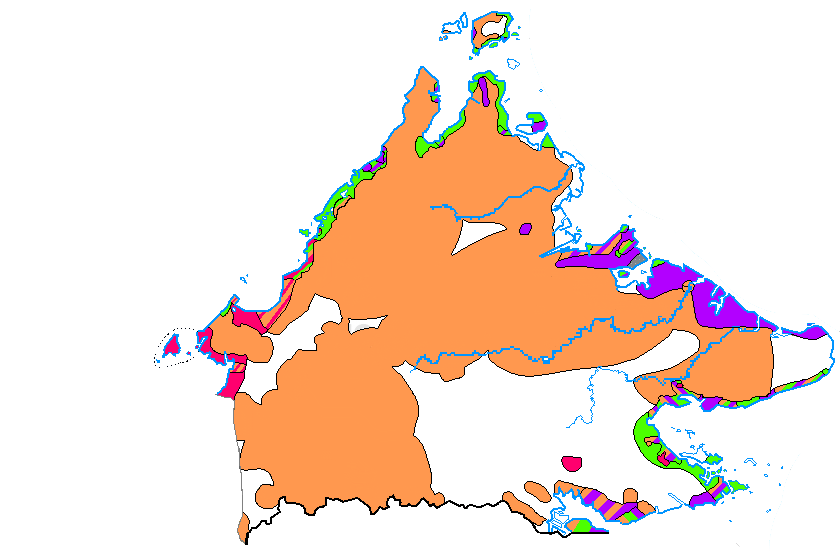
The distribution of language families of Sabah shown by colours: (click image to enlarge) North Bornean Sama–Bajaw Malayic Philippine Areas with multiple languages

In 1971, the state government of Sabah under Mustapha Harun submitted an enactment recognising Malaysian Malay as the state's official language. Following the amendments of 1973 constitution, the use of English was restricted to official purposes with the extension of the 1967 Malaysian National Language Act. As a result of the domination of Malay in the state, English proficiency among younger Sabahan generations has been gradually decreasing.

The largest indigenous language, Kadazan Dusun, has become an endangered language, as its study has not been made compulsory in state schools.

Due to the tight Malay culture and language policies over national schools, many Sabahan bumiputera parents have preferred to send their children to Chinese schools. A 2010 survey revealed there were around 12,138 Sabahan bumiputera students enrolled in Chinese national type primary schools and preschools; thus, Sabah had the second-highest number of bumiputera pupils enrolment in Chinese schools (after Sarawak). In addition to the perception among non-Chinese parents that Chinese schools provided a better-quality education and were more disciplined, the rise of China as a global economic power incentivised learning Chinese languages.

Since 2014, the British Council have actively given assistance to teach English in primary schools; this was followed by the US Fulbright Program in 2015 for teaching English in secondary schools. The Kadazan Dusun language also started to be promoted at the same time, with language teachers completing training in 2018 and starting to teach in 2019. Since 2016, the Sabah Education Department has set Tuesday as "English Day" for schools, to increase English proficiency in the state and encourage younger generations to converse more in English.

Following the 2018 general election, the new Sabah government removed restrictions on the usage of English in the state, adding that even if the Education Ministry decrees it unlawful for English be used in Sabah, the government will not allow the restriction to be imposed in the state. This is because restrictions on English would damage younger generations, especially when they need to work in private firms or organisations that require English proficiency. The new state government also stated that they will look into the matters if there is a need to change the state law.

== Immigration to Sabah ==
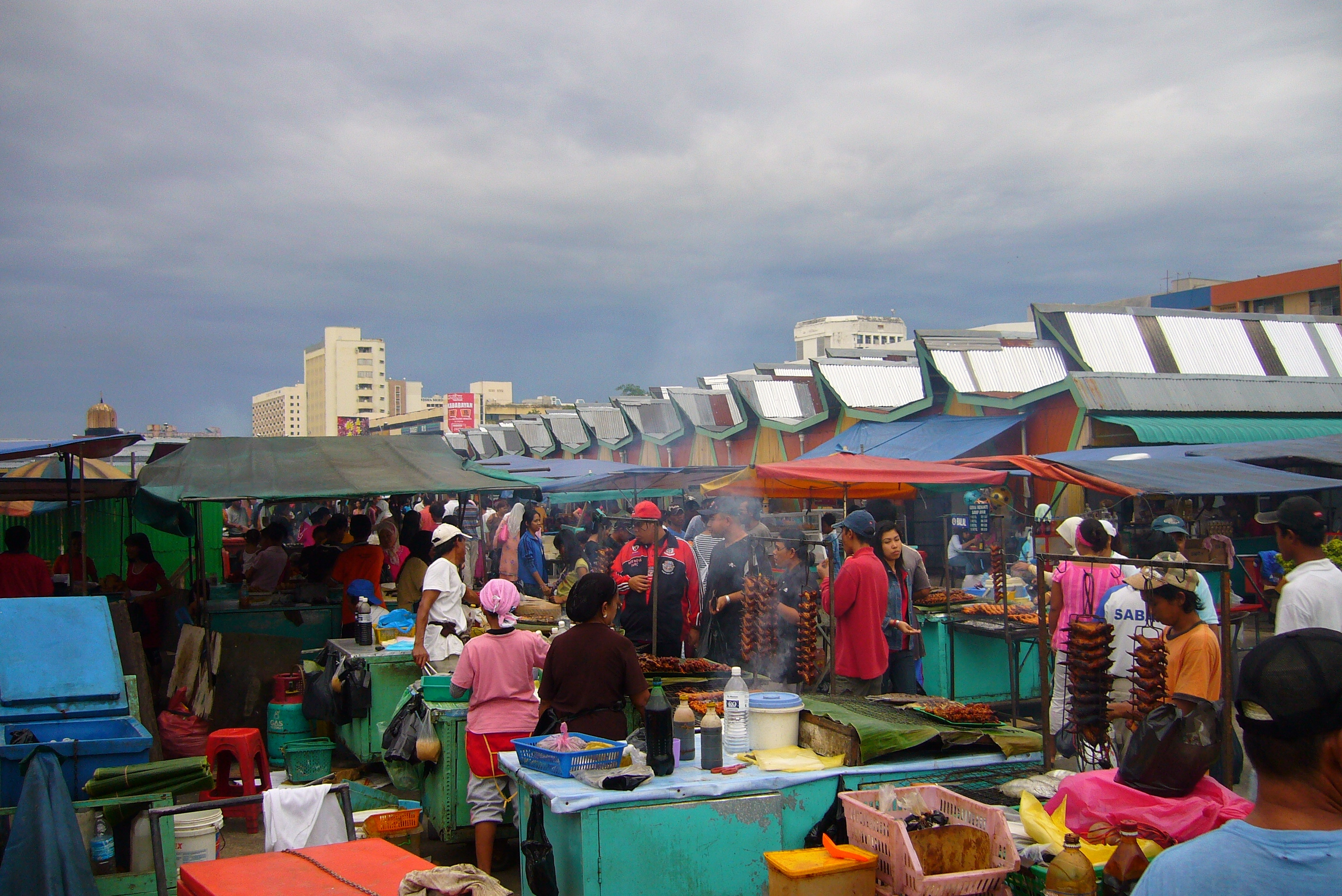
Filipino Market (present-day officially named as Anjung Kinabalu) located within Fuad Stephens Road in Kota Kinabalu. Overseas Filipinos top the list of migrants in Sabah.

Immigration to Sabah (Note: Including those who became citizens through naturalisation, intermarriage with local natives, and non-natives who are Malaysian citizens due to the recent migrations.)
Origin	Estimation (+)
Philippines	1,000,000 (Note: Including refugees.)
Indonesia	500,000
China / Taiwan	200,000
Brunei	70,000
India	7,000
South Korea	2,000
Pakistan	1,000
Japan	300
Thailand	200
East Timor	100

The connection and movement of people between Sabah, Sarawak, Brunei, the southern Philippines, and the Indonesian province of Kalimantan have existed for centuries. Trade within the area dates back as early as the 9th century. In modern times, prior to laws and lawlessness issues created by recent immigrants, there was an emphasis to control and monitor illegal movements.

The first modern wave of migration occurred in the late 16th century, when pressure from Spanish colonists in the southern Philippines led to increased immigration to Sadah of Philippine ethnic groups such as Suluks and Bajaus. In the 1970s, thousands of Filipino refugees, mostly the Moros, began arriving due to conflict and political uncertainty in Mindanao.

The Filipino refugees in Sabah were welcomed by certain state politicians (mostly from USNO, BERJAYA, and the dominant federal government political party of UMNO) to increase the racial balance in favour to the Malays. In this way, the state autonomy in immigration was manipulated for political gains. In contrast, the Vietnamese refugees in Peninsular Malaysia were repatriated to maintain the racial balance for the Malays. Some Vietnamese boat refugees reached Sabah as part of the Indochina refugee crisis, although most were sent to Western countries, as the Malaysian leader at the time (Mahathir Mohamad) only wanted to receive Muslim refugees. Since 2000, around 20,000 Muslim foreigners from the Philippines and Indonesia have married local Sabahans, in addition to a number of foreign men from Afghanistan, Algeria, and Bangladesh marrying local Sabahan women, based on figures released by the Sabah Islamic Religious Affairs Department (JHEAINS).

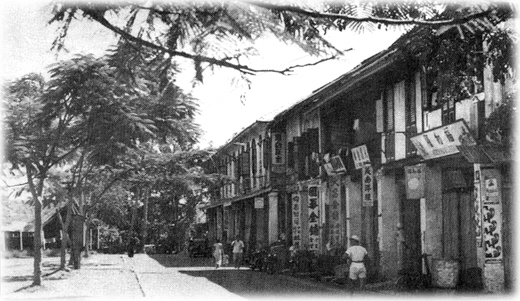
Chinese-owned shops on Gaya Street, Jesselton in 1930

Sabah has a significant Chinese minority. Chinese immigrants first came to Sabah from southern China in the late 19th century, fleeing famine and overpopulation. They were enticed to Sabah by the promises of British colonists, who invited them to help clear the forests and farm the land in return for various benefits. While early Chinese immigrants were primarily involved in agriculture, most eventually became involved in business, operating sundry shops, coffee shops, and so on. To this day, Chinese Sabahans play a pivotal role in the state's commercial scene. Most Chinese Sabahans are of Hakka descent, but there are significant numbers of Chinese Sabahans from other dialect groups, especially the Cantonese and Hokkien subgroups. The largest Chinese populations in Sabah are in the three major cities of Kota Kinabalu, Sandakan, and Tawau. Smaller rural communities exist, particularly in the districts of Kudat, Keningau, Tenom, and Beaufort.

Unlike in Peninsular Malaysia, the South Asian population in Sabah is small. It consists mainly of Indians and Pakistanis, some of whom are descended from immigrants who served in the British colonial military. Sabah is also home to a large number of foreign immigrants from Indonesia and the Philippines. The Indonesian community is composed mostly of Buginese, Florenese, Torajans, and Timorese people who have come to Sabah to work as labourers, in oil palm plantations or as domestic workers. The Filipino community can broadly be divided into two: descendants of mostly Christian immigrants who worked as professionals during the colonial era, and the mostly-Muslim immigrants from the southern Philippines who came during the USNO era. In recent years, the number of expatriates in the state has increased. They come mostly from China, Taiwan, South Korea, Japan, Australia, and various countries in Europe, particularly the United Kingdom.

== Demographic issues ==
There are many reports stating that following the influx of refugees and foreigners from the Muslim areas of Mindanao in the Philippines and Sulawesi in Indonesia, a "secretive taskforce" was established in the 1970s during Mustapha Harun's term as Chief Minister to register them as citizens. Then, from 1988 to 1990, the taskforce registered not only Muslim refugees and migrants but also Muslims from Peninsular Malaysia to topple the majority Christian state government under PBS.

A source from one of the former Sabah Chief Ministers estimated the total of illegal immigrants in the state to be around 400,000–500,000, while Sabah's opposition parties together with the Filipino community leaders indicated that the numbers had surpassed one million. This complicated estimate was a result of frequent "controversial regularisation", with illegal immigrants and refugees changing their status to "legal citizen". Furthermore, most of those who were deported could return within weeks or a few months. Most of the immigration issues were perceived by the locals as politically motivated to systematically change the demography of the state.

As a case example, in 2016, a local woman living in Sabah and born to a Sabahan indigenous family was denied citizenship by the state government, whereas recently arrived immigrants had acquired their Malaysian identity card (MyKad) in just a short time despite not having any relationships with Malaysian citizens:

I was born at home at Kg Enubai (Tenom District) in 1960, so my birth was not registered then. When I turned 12, my mum brought me to the JPN Office to apply for a blue IC. It was a hassling experience as the authorities wanted proof of my local birth. We managed to find the village midwife who delivered me. But I was still given a red IC. I speak Malaysian language, Murut, Dusun, Hakka, Cantonese and Mandarin. I grew up with Murut and Dusun kids. When I talk to people in the Peninsula, they know straightaway that I am from Sabah. Even the police once said to me, 'Aunty, dari Sabahkah?' (Aunty, from Sabah?). But the Indonesian women who live in my area and can only speak Indonesian Malay have got MyKad. Isn't this strange? The Indonesian women said: 'Kami datang lima tahun, sudah dapat IC', (We have been here five years already, we have already got IC).

Another indigenous woman faced difficulties in sending her child to school when the child was listed as a Muslim without the mother's consent on his recently received birth certificate from the National Registration Department (NRD). The mother refused to accept the document, as the child was born Christian. Repeated occurrence of such cases has caused the department to be accused of practising religiously motivated "cleansing" of the state to systematically Islamize its people.

Added to this was the exposure of corruption within the Malaysian authorities by an Indonesian investigative television program in late 2016. The program revealed that thousands of Indonesian migrants were crossing easily through the border in Tawau Division every day, with many of the illegal immigrants also using fake identity cards to receive the "Bantuan Rakyat 1Malaysia" (a type of Malaysian government aid to local low-income Malaysians in the form of money).

By 2016, these issues had created some ethnic tension among Sabahans as well affecting the security and stability of the state. Due to this, the federal government agreed to set up a royal commission to investigate the problems. Among the proposals by Sabahan parties during the commission was one to recall all identity cards (ICs) issued in the state and issue new ICs only for eligible Sabahan citizens; this would also ensure the integrity of the MyKad system. The federal government was also urged to speed up the process of registering all stateless indigenous natives, in light of the fact that indigenous people are supposedly regarded as deserving a special position in their own homeland. Following the coverage of the issue, the Chief Minister instructed NRD to rectify the matters immediately.

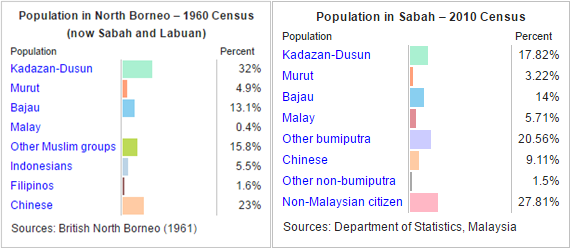
Demographic composition of North Borneo in 1960 and Sabah in 2010

== See also ==
- Demographics of Sarawak
- Demographics of Malaysia
