= Tatana language =

Austronesian language spoken in Sabah, Malaysia

Tatana'
- Region: Sabah
- Ethnicity: Bisaya
- Native speakers: (21,000 cited 1982–2000)
- Language family: Austronesian: Malayo-Polynesian; Western Indonesian?; Greater North Bornean?; North Bornean; Sabahan; Southwest; Murutic–Papar–Tatana; Tatana'

Language codes
- ISO 639-3: txx – Tatana'
- Glottolog: tata1257 Tatana

Sabah Bisaya
- Region: Sabah
- Ethnicity: Bisaya
- Language family: Austronesian: Malayo-Polynesian; Western Indonesian?; Greater North Bornean?; North Bornean; Sabahan; Southwest; Dusunic–Paitanic; Bisaya–Lotud–Dusunic?; Bisaya–Lotud; Sabah Bisaya

Language codes
- ISO 639-3: bsy – Sabah Bisaya
- Glottolog: saba1267 Sabah Bisaya

Tatana (Tatanaq) is a Sabahan language spoken in Sabah, Malaysia. Due to limited studies, it is hard to ascertain whether Tatana requires a category on its own or is considered a Bisaya variety based on its 90% linguistic intelligibility with the closely related Bisaya ethnic in Sabah. The current speakers of Tatana identify themselves as an ethnic subgroup of the Dusun people of Borneo. Jason Lobel (2013:360) classifies Tatana (along with Papar) as Murutic rather than Dusunic.

== Phonology ==
=== Consonants ===
		Labial	Alveolar	Palatal	Velar	Glottal
Plosive/ Affricate	voiceless	p	t		k	ʔ
Plosive/ Affricate	voiced	b	d	dʒ	ɡ	
Nasal		m	n	ɲ	ŋ	
Fricative			s			
Approximant		w	l	j		
Rhotic			ɾ ~ r			

- /ɾ/ may also be heard as a trill [r].
- Stop sounds /p, t, k/ and /b, d, ɡ/ are heard as unreleased [C̚] in word-final positions.

=== Vowels ===
	Front	Central	Back
Close	i		u
Mid	(ɛ)	ə	(ɔ)
Open	a		

Phoneme	Allophone
/ə/	[ə], [ɛ], [œ], [ɤ], [ɔ]
/a/	[ä], [æ], [ʌ]
