= Kota Marudu Talantang language =

Austronesian language spoken in Sabah, Malaysia

Kota Marudu Talantang
- Native to: Malaysia
- Region: Sabah
- Native speakers: 1,800 (2000)
- Language family: Austronesian: Malayo-Polynesian; North Bornean; Southwest Sabahan; Dusunic; Dusun; Central Dusun; Kota Marudu Talantang

Language codes
- ISO 639-3: grm
- Glottolog: kota1279

Kota Marudu Talantang is an Austronesian language of Sabah, Malaysia.
