= Minokok =

Minokok people Dusun Minokok
Total population
- 2,000 (1991)

Regions with significant populations
- Malaysia: 1,400

Languages
- Minokok, Sabah Malay, Standard Malay and English

Religion
- Animism (predominantly), Christianity

Related ethnic groups
- Kadazan-Dusun

The Minokok are an indigenous ethnic group residing in Sabah, Malaysia. They reside near the headwaters of Kinabatangan River, in Sandakan Division. Their population was estimated at 2,000 in the year 1991. They are considered a sub-group of the Kadazan-Dusun, as their language (ISO 639-3 mqq) belongs to the Dusunic branch of the Austronesian language family. About 35% of the population has been converted to evangelical Christianity, the remainder are animist.

== See also ==
- Demographics of Sabah
