= Molbog language =

Austronesian language

Molbog
- Native to: Philippines, Malaysia
- Region: Palawan (southern part); Sabah (Banggi and north coast of Borneo)
- Ethnicity: Molbog
- Native speakers: (6,700 in the Philippines cited 1990)
- Language family: Austronesian: Malayo-Polynesian; Philippine; Greater Central Philippine; Palawanic (?); Molbog

Language codes
- ISO 639-3: pwm
- Glottolog: molb1237

Molbog is an Austronesian language spoken in the Philippines and Sabah, Malaysia. The majority of speakers are concentrated at the southernmost tip of the Philippine province of Palawan, particularly the municipalities of Bataraza and Balabac, as well as in neighboring municipalities such as Rizal and Brooke's Point. These two early municipalities were considered bastions of environmental conservation in the province. Apart from that, it is also found in the municipality of Mapun, in the province of Tawi-Tawi, spoken by a small portion besides the Jama Mapun language. Almost all Molbog speakers are Sunni Muslims.

The classification of Molbog is controversial. Thiessen (1981) groups Molbog with the Palawanic languages, based on shared phonological and lexical innovations. This classification is supported by Smith (2017). An alternative view is taken by Lobel (2013), who puts Molbog together with Bonggi in a Molbog-Bonggi subgroup. Ethnically, the Molbog was previously a sub-group of the larger Palaw'an people, and later became as it is due to Islamic influences from the Tausug and Sama-Bajau peoples. Its speakers are also found on the north coast of Borneo and Banggi Island in Sabah, Malaysia.

== Phonology ==
=== Consonants ===
		Labial	Alveolar	Palatal	Velar	Glottal
Plosive	voiceless	p	t		k	ʔ
Plosive	voiced	b	d	(dʒ)	ɡ	
Nasal		m	n	(ɲ)	ŋ	
Fricative			s			h
Flap			ɾ			
Lateral			l			
Approximant		w		j		

- The sounds [dʒ, ɲ] occur as a result of loanwords from Spanish, Malay or dialects of the Sama language.
- /h/ only occurs marginally. While it was generally lost in inherited words, it is retained in some words e.g. luhaʔ 'tears', probably through re-borrowing.

=== Vowels ===
	Front	Central	Back
Close	i		u
Mid			o
Open		a	
