= Molbog-Bonggi languages =

Austronesian language microgroup

Molbog-Bonggi
- (disputed)
- Geographic distribution: Sabah
- Linguistic classification: Austronesian: Malayo-Polynesian; North Bornean; Northeast Sabahan; Molbog-Bonggi

Language codes
- Glottolog: None

The Molbog-Bonggi languages are a proposed microgroup the Austronesian languages comprising Bonggi and Molbog, spoken in Sabah on Borneo, on Palawan in the Philippines, and on the islands in between.

The classification of Molbog is controversial. Thiessen (1981) groups Molbog with the Palawanic languages, based on shared phonological and lexical innovations. This classification is supported by Smith (2017). An alternative view is taken by Lobel (2013), who puts Molbog together with Bonggi in a Molbog-Bonggi subgroup.
