= Brunei Bisaya language =

Sabahan language spoken in Brunei and Malaysia

Bisaya
- Tutong 1
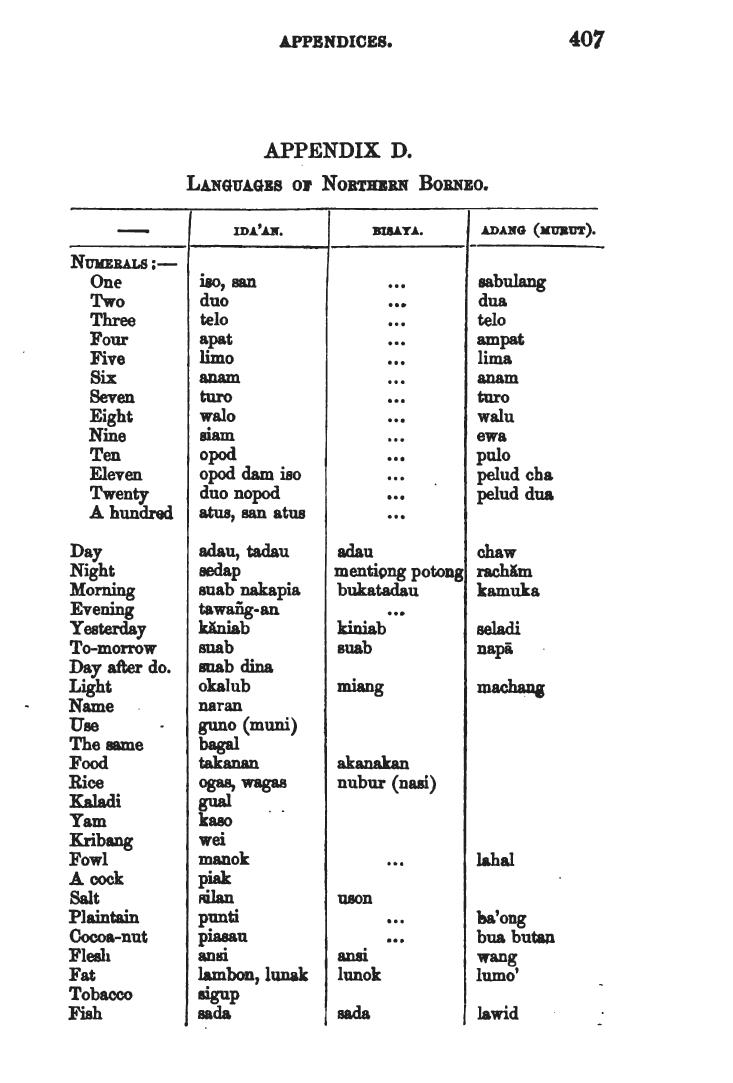
- Collection of words in English and translation in Ida'an, Bisaya (Borneo) and Adang Murut (Lun Bawang) in 1860 by Spencer St.John
- Region: Brunei, Sarawak
- Native speakers: 60,000 (2007)
- Language family: Austronesian: Malayo-Polynesian; Western Indonesian?; Greater North Bornean?; North Bornean; Sabahan; Southwest; Dusunic–Paitanic; Bisaya–Lotud–Dusunic?; Bisaya–Lotud; Bisaya

Language codes
- ISO 639-3: bsb
- Glottolog: brun1245

Bisaya, also known as Southern Bisaya, Brunei Bisaya, Brunei Dusun or Tutong 1, is a Sabahan language spoken in Brunei and Sarawak, Malaysia.

== Phonology ==
=== Vowels ===
	Front	Central	Back
Close	i		u
Mid	(e)	(ə)	ɤ ~ o
Open		a	

- /ɤ/ may also be heard as rounded [o], and may have an allophone of [ə].
- /i/ may also have an allophone of [e].

=== Consonants ===
		Labial	Alveolar	Palatal	Velar	Glottal
Nasal		m	n	ɲ	ŋ	
Plosive/ Affricate	voiceless	p	t	tʃ	k	ʔ
Plosive/ Affricate	voiced	b	d	dʒ	ɡ	
Plosive/ Affricate	prenasal vl.	ᵐp	ⁿt			
Plosive/ Affricate	prenasal vd.	ᵐb	ⁿd			
Fricative			s		ɣ	(h)
Rhotic			(r)			
Approximant		w	l	j		

- /ɣ/ may also be heard as uvular [ʁ].
- Sounds /r, h/ are only restricted to Malay loanwords.
