= Lotud language =

Austronesian language spoken in Sabah, Malaysia

Lotud
- Native to: Malaysia
- Region: Sabah
- Ethnicity: 20,000 (2016)
- Language family: Austronesian: Malayo-Polynesian; North Bornean; Southwest Sabahan; Greater Dusunic; Bisaya–Lotud; Lotud

Language codes
- ISO 639-3: dtr
- Glottolog: lotu1250

Lotud, also known as Dusun Lotud, is a shifting Austronesian language of Sabah, Malaysia.
