= Maragang =

Kimaragang people Tulun Maragang
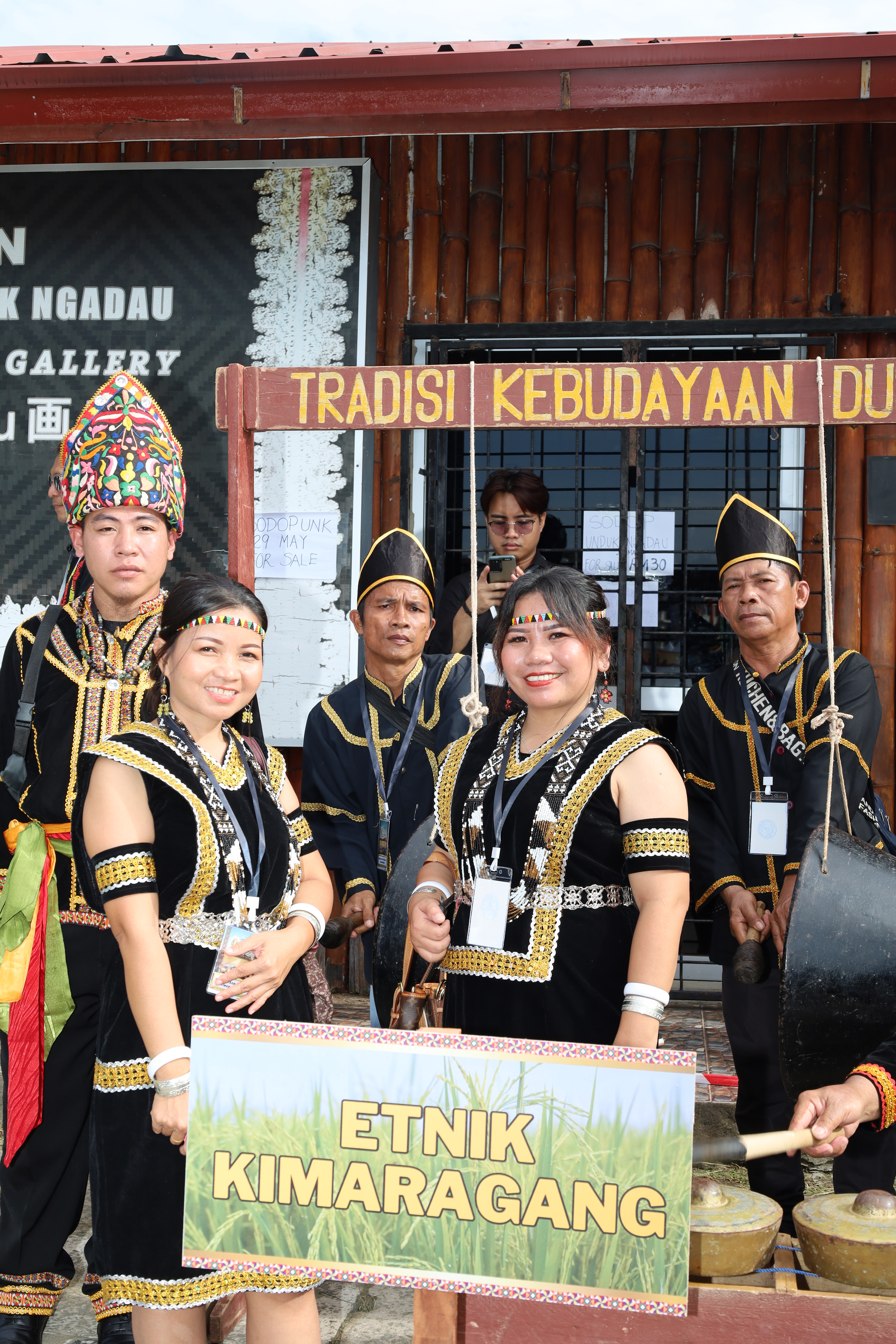
- Kimaragang Dusun in their traditional dress

Total population
- 10,000 (1987)

Regions with significant populations
- Malaysia: 2,500

Languages
- Maragang (native), Malaysian (Sabah Malay dialect) and Sabahan English

Religion
- Christianity (predominantly), Islam

Related ethnic groups
- Kadazan-Dusun

The Kimaragang or Maragang people are an indigenous ethnic group residing in Sabah, eastern Malaysia on the island of Borneo. They reside in the Kota Marudu and Pitas districts of Kudat Division. Their population was estimated at 10,000 in the year 1987. They are considered a sub-group of the Kadazan-Dusun, as their language (ISO 639-3 kqr) belongs to the Dusunic branch of the Austronesian language family. They are primarily farmers, raising paddy rice, cocoa and cash crops.
