= Dusun language =

Language of Dusun people of Malaysia

Central Dusun
- Bunduliwan
- Boros Dusun
- Native to: Malaysia, Brunei
- Region: Sabah and Federal Territory of Labuan
- Ethnicity: Dusun people, Kadazan people Ethnic population: 714,000 (2024)
- Native speakers: 260,000 Central Dusun (2010)
- Language family: Austronesian: Malayo-Polynesian; North Bornean; Southwest Sabahan; Dusunic; Dusun; Central Dusun
- Standard forms: Kadazandusun language (this page)

Official status
- Recognised minority language in: Malaysia (as Kadazandusun)
- Regulated by: Multiple: Kadazandusun Cultural Association Sabah; Kadazandusun Language Foundation; United Sabah Dusun Association; Kadazan Society Sabah

Language codes
- ISO 639-3: dtp
- Glottolog: cent2100

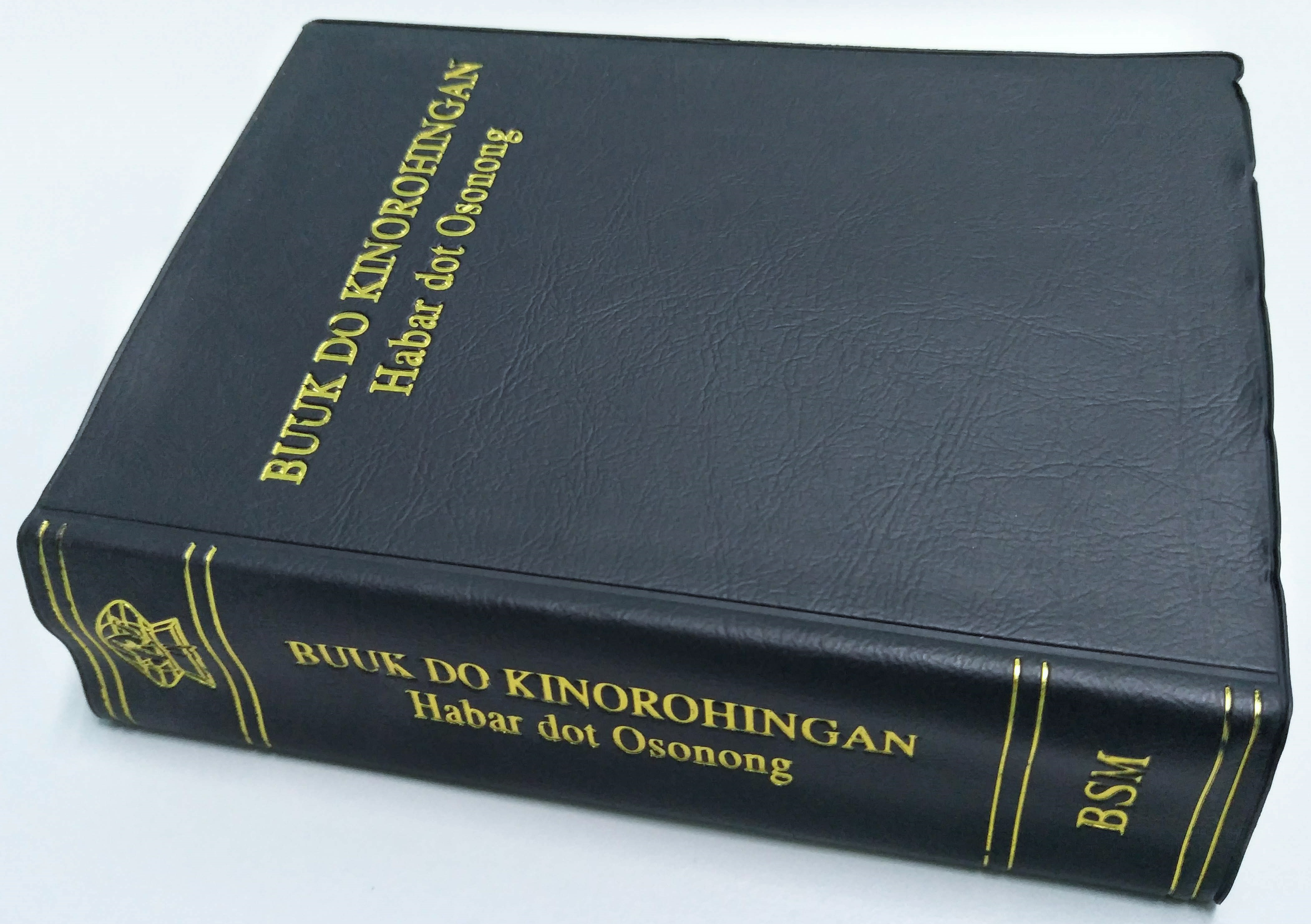
A Dusun-language translation of the Bible

Central Dusun, also known as Bunduliwan (Boros Dusun), is an Austronesian language and one of the more widespread languages spoken by the Dusun (including Kadazan) peoples of Sabah, Malaysia. In 1995, the central Bundu-Liwan dialect was selected to serve as the basis for a standardised "Kadazandusun" language.

== History ==
What is termed as Central Dusun (or simply Dusun) and Coastal Kadazan (or simply Kadazan) are deemed to be highly mutually intelligible to one other; many consider these to be part of a single language.

The language was among many other Sabahan vernacular languages suppressed under Mustapha Harun's assimilationist enforcement of Bahasa Malaysia across the state. Under the efforts of the Kadazandusun Cultural Association Sabah, in 1995, the central Bundu-Liwan dialect was selected to serve as the basis for a standardised "Kadazandusun" language. This dialect, spoken in the Bundu and Liwan valleys of the Crocker-Trusmadi ranges (now parts of the present-day districts of Ranau, Tambunan and Keningau), was selected as it was deemed to be the most mutually intelligible when conversing with other "Dusun" or "Kadazan" dialects.

== Phonology ==
The phonemes in Central Dusun and Coastal Kadazan are as follows:

=== Consonants ===
Central Dusun consonants
		Labial	Alveolar	Dorsal	Glottal
Nasal		m	n	ŋ	
Plosive	voiceless	p	t	k	ʔ
Plosive	voiced	b	d	ɡ	
Fricative			s		h
Rhotic			r		
Approximant		w	l	j	

Robinson specifies that /r/ in Tindal Dusun is a flap [ɾ].

Coastal Kadazan consonants
		Labial	Alveolar	Dorsal	Glottal
Nasal		m	n	ŋ	
Plosive	voiceless	p	t	k	ʔ
Plosive	voiced	b	d	ɡ	
Implosive		ɓ	ɗ		
Fricative	voiceless		s		h
Fricative	voiced	v	z		
Approximant			l		

[x] occurs as an allophone of /k/ in word-medial position.

Tangit and MBDK note that Coastal Kadazan consonants correspond to the following consonants found in other varieties:

Central Dusun consonant	Coastal Kadazan cognate	Example
/r/	/l/	CD ralan, CK lahan "road"
/r/	/∅/	CD boros, CK boos "word"
/l/	/h/	CD loyou, CK hozou "song"
/w/	/v/	CD awasi, CK avasi "good"
/j/	/z/	CD agayo, CK agazo "big"

=== Vowels ===
Kadazandusun is usually said to have four vowels /a i u o/. According to Tingit, /o/ in Central Dusun is less rounded [o̜, ɤ] than in Coastal Kadazan and is sometimes represented with ⟨e⟩.

== Orthography ==
Dusun is written using the Latin alphabet using 21 characters (the letters C, E, F, Q, and X are used in loanwords):

A B D G H I J K L M N O P R S T U V W Y Z

These characters together are called Pimato.

Diphthongs: ⟨aa⟩ ⟨ai⟩ (sometimes pronounced /e/) ⟨ii⟩ ⟨oi⟩ ⟨uu⟩

Some combinations of vowels do not form diphthongs and each vowel retains its separate sound: ⟨ao⟩ ⟨ia⟩ ⟨iu⟩ ⟨ui⟩ ⟨ue⟩. In some words ⟨aa⟩ is not a diphthong, and this is indicated by an apostrophe between the two vowels: a'a.

== Grammar ==
=== Personal pronouns ===
Tindal Dusun has a Philippine-type focus system of syntax that makes one particular noun phrase in a sentence the most prominent. The prominent or focused noun (or noun phrase) is not necessarily the subject or the agent. In clauses with pronouns, both the pronoun as well as the verbal morphology carry indication of focus. If the verbal morphology carries actor-focus, the clause's actor will be a nominative pronoun - or rarely an emphatic pronoun. Any other noun phrase in the clause must take pronouns from a different set, as only one noun phrase can be the focus of a clause.

Tindal pronouns
Gloss	Nominative	Genitive	Oblique	Emphatic
1sg	oku	ku	doho	joho
2sg	ko	nu	diaʔ	jaʔ
3sg	isio	disio~dow	isio	
1in	toko			jatiʔ
1ex	jahaj~jahɛː	dahɛː		jahɛː
2pl	jokow	dokow	jokow	
3pl	joloʔ	dioloʔ	joloʔ	

Kadazandusun pronouns
Gloss	Emphatic	Nominative	Genitive	Oblique
1sg	yoku	oku	ku	doho
1du	yati/dati/iyahai	kito/iyahai/ikoi	dato/dahai	
1pl	yotokou	tokou		dotokou
2sg	ika/ia'	ko/ika/ia'	nu	dia'/dika
2pl	ikoyu	kou	dikoyu	
3sg.m	isio		disido/dau	
3sg.f	isido		dosido/dau	
3pl	yolo		diolo	

"The "emphatic" pronouns are used alone or preposedly, either as answers or to stress the pronoun.

==== Examples ====
Ika i Kinomulok?
You(emph) [personal] Kinomulok
Are you Kinomulok?

I Kinomulok oku
[personal] Kinomulok I
I am Kinomulok.

Isai ko?
Who you(non-emph)
Who are you?

I Tolimu oku
[personal] Batholomew I
I am Bartholomew.

Ika mongoi.
You go
You go.

=== Sentence structure ===
A typical Dusun sentence is VSO.

Poposidang oku parai.
dry I rice
I dry rice.

It is, however, possible for a grammatically correct Dusun sentence to be SVO.

Oinsanan tangaanak sikul nonuan {do uniform.}
all children school given uniform
All students have been given uniforms.

== Vocabulary ==
Numerals
English	Dusun
one	iso
two	duo
three	tolu
four	apat
five	limo
six	onom
seven	turu
eight	walu
nine	siam
ten	hopod
hundred	hatus
thousand	soriong

To form numbers such as fifty or sixty, a multiplier is combined with a positional unit (tens, hundreds, thousands etc.), using no.

tolu no hopod
three already ten
thirty

Separate units are combined with om.

soriong om turu no hatus om duo no hopod om siam
1000 and seven already 100 and two already ten and nine
one thousand, seven hundred and twenty nine

Months
English	Dusun
January	Milatok
February	Mansak
March	Gomot
April	Ngiop
May	Mikat
June	Mahas/Rilik
July	Madas/Tutud
August	Magus/Ngurak
September	Manom
October	Gumas
November	Milau
December	Momuhau

The Dusun name of the months derive from the traditional cycle of paddy harvesting.

Days of the week
English	Dusun	
English	Dusun name	Numerical
Monday	Tontolu	Tadau koiso
Tuesday	Mirod	Tadau koduo
Wednesday	Madsa	Tadau kotolu
Thursday	Tadtaru	Tadau kaapat
Friday	Kurudu	Tadau kolimo
Saturday	Kukuak	Tadau koonom
Sunday	Tiwang	Tadau koturu/minggu

The names for the days of the week are mostly based on a simple numerical sequence, which is commonly used for media and newspapers. The names of Dusun days as part of the seven-day week derive from the life cycle of a butterfly.

Interrogatives
English	Dusun
what	nunu/onu
who	isai
where	hombo/nonggo
when	soira
why	okuro
how	poingkuro
how many	piro/songkuro

== Dialects ==
Central Dusun is divided into four main dialect groups:

- Liwanic: Liwan, Inobong Dusun, Tuhawon
- Bunduic: Bundu, Sinulihan, Tagahas, Manggatal Dusun
- Tindalic: Tindal-Kiau-Tempasuk, Luba-Tonduk-Gobukon
- Ulu Sugut Dusun: Tinagas, Lingkabau, Talantang

Central Dusun dialects are mostly mutually intelligible when conversing.

== Sample prayers ==
=== Our Father ===
Tama dahai id surga, apantang daa o ngaran nu, korikot noh daa kopomorintaan nu, nadadi noh kaandak nu hiti'd tana miagal hilo'd surga, tahako dahai tadau diti ie takanon dahai tikid tadau, om poliongo noh douso dahai miagal nogi'd poliongo dahai id sontob pinokumaus dahai. Om kada pologoso yahai id koimbayatan, nga palapaso dahai noh do mantad kaaratan. Amin.

Translation:

Our Father, who art in heaven, hallowed be thy name. Thy kingdom come, Thy will be done on earth as it is in heaven. Give us this day our daily bread, and forgive us our sins, as we forgive those who sin against us. Do not lead us into temptation, but deliver us from evil. Amen.

=== Hail Mary ===
Ave Maria, noponu noh grasia, miampai diya Kinorohingan, obitua kou do'd sawi-awi tondu, om obitua tuwa' tinan nu, Yesus. Sangti Maria, tama kinorohingan, insiano yahai/ikoi tulun mominidouso, do baino om ontok jaam kapataion ya. Amin.

Translation:

Hail Mary, full of grace, the Lord is with you. Blessed are you among women, and blessed is the fruit of your womb, Jesus. Holy Mary, Mother of God, pray for us sinners, now and at the hour of our death. Amen.

== Bibliography ==
Tangit, Trixie M. (May 2005), Planning Kadazandusun (Sabah, Malaysia): Labels, Identity and Language, Mānoa: University of Hawaiʻi at Mānoa

Robinson, Laura C. (2005), "A sketch grammar of Tindal Dusun", University of Hawaiʻi Working Papers in Linguistics, vol. 36, no. 5, Mānoa: University of Hawaiʻi at Mānoa, pp. 1–31
