= Idaʼan =

Sabah Native People

Idaʼan Idahan / Eraan
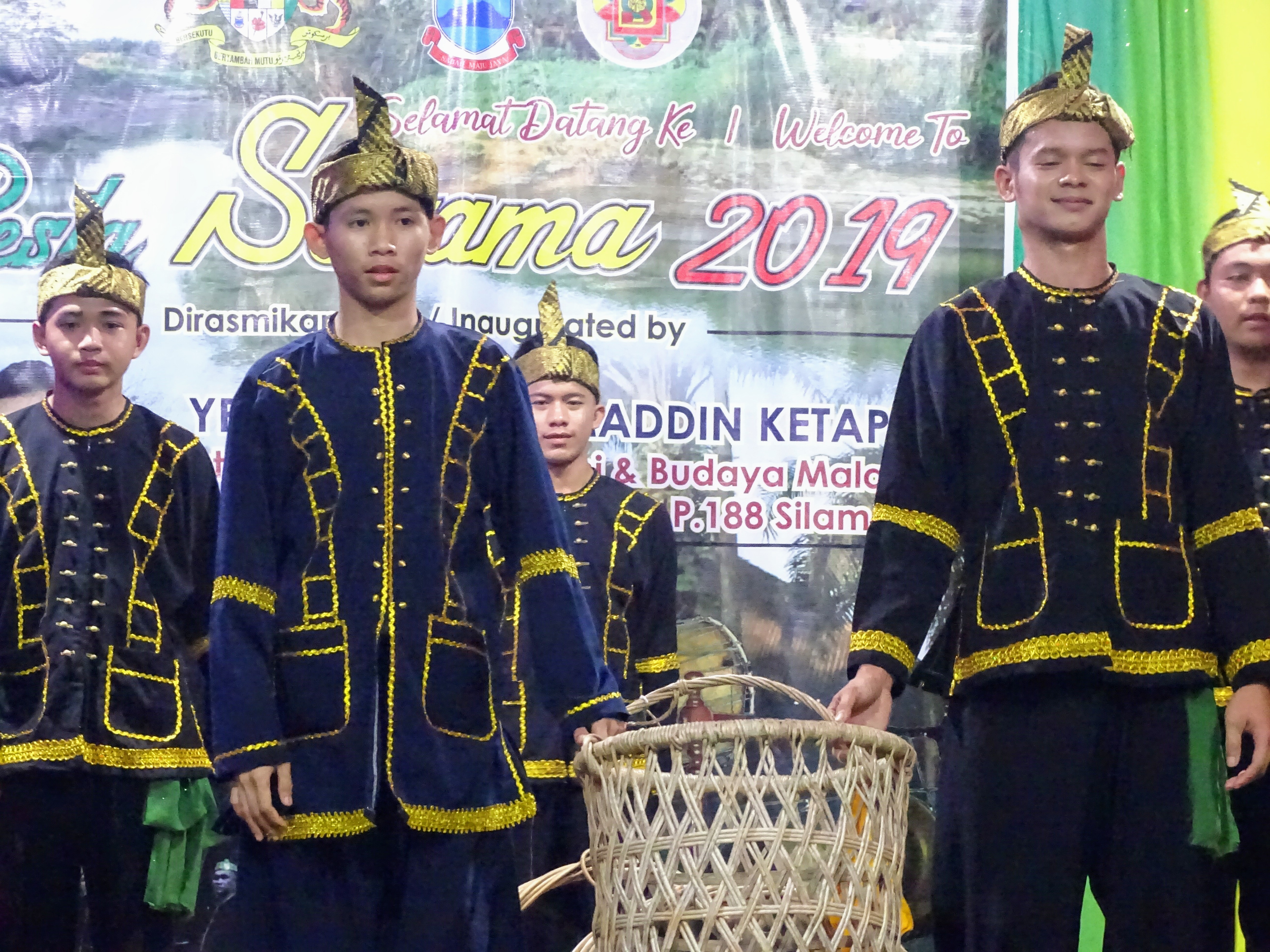

Total population
- 16,000–30,000

Regions with significant populations
- Malaysia (Sabah)

Languages
- Idaʼan, Malay, English

Religion
- Islam

Related ethnic groups
- Orang Sungai, Murut, Bonggi

The Idaʼan (Idahan or Eraan or Sabahan) people are an ethnic group residing primarily in the Lahad Datu and Tawau districts on the east coast of Sabah, Malaysia. Their current population is estimated to be around 6,000 (1987 estimate), but it appears that they once inhabited a much larger area along the east Sabah coast than present. For centuries, the Ida’an have owned exclusive rights to the collection of edible bird's nests in the limestone caves of the region, notably the Madai Caves. Most Idaʼan are Sunni Muslims.

== Etymology ==
Historically, the Idaʼan are known by several names such as Era'an, Saba'an/Sabahan (not to be confused with Sabahan which refers to the residents of Sabah), Iraqan and Buludupi. But according to local folk story, the Idaʼan were originally known as Bedaro but they later changed the name to Idaʼan after converting to Islam.

== History ==
The ancestors of Idaʼan people lived around Madai caves for centuries and have a significant role in cultural identity of Idaʼan people. According to Idaʼan mythology and Sabahan activist and writer Mutalib M.D from his writings called Hikayat Raja Sabah, the Idaʼan used to have a kingdom called Bu-lud Temil which was founded by a man named Aki Apoi. The Kingdom of Bu-lud Temil was said to cover a vast areas of land spreading from Kinabatangan river to the shores of Semporna and Gua Madai was its capital.

The Idaʼan converted to Islam in the early 15th century after its king by the name of Raja Abdullah converted to Islam and introduced Islam to his kingdom. However some groups of Idaʼan maintained their own beliefs and migrated inland, becoming the ancestors of Begak (Bagahak) and Subpan people.

== Culture ==
=== Cuisines ===
The most well-known Idaʼan cuisine is the Alau. Alau is a red durian (Durio graveolens) which has become a delicacy amongst the Idaʼan people. In Malay it is called Durian Burung (Bird's Durian). Other traditional Idaʼan cuisines are Temba' Pait, Temba' Kedaso, Pait Pelom, Sambal Gembuan, Tassam Badas Kayu, Tassam Buduk, Sekilo Kayu Kegut and Putti Bebbag.

=== Cultural Festivals ===
There are two main Idaʼan festivals which were celebrated by Idaʼan every year that is Pesta Mengalap which is a Bird's Nest Harvesting Festival held in Gua Madai and Pesta Salag which is a festival celebrating Idaʼan culture and traditions.

== Language ==
Idaʼan or Idahan is an Austronesian language belonging to the Northeastern Sabahan branch of North Bornean family. It is closely related to Bonggi language spoken in Banggi island. The languages spoken by Begak and Subpan people are considered as varieties of Idaʼan language.

Unlike most languages in Sabah, Idaʼan has a long literary history dating back as early as the 15th century. The earliest known Idaʼan manuscript was from a man named Abdullah who lived in Lahad Datu Bay in 1408 AD and the manuscript is written in the Jawi alphabet.

== Notable Idahan ==
- Mohamaddin Ketapi – the former Malaysian minister and Sabah minister.

== See also ==
- Idaʼan language
