= Idaʼan language =

Austronesian language spoken in Sabah, Malaysia

Idaʼan
- Begak
- Native to: Malaysia
- Region: Lahad Datu, Kinabatangan, and Sandakan districts of Sabah
- Ethnicity: Idaʼan
- Native speakers: 10,000 (2013)
- Language family: Austronesian: Malayo-Polynesian; North Bornean; Sabahan; Northeast Sabahan; Idaʼan

Language codes
- ISO 639-3: dbj
- Glottolog: idaa1241

The Idaʼan (also Idahan) language is a Malayo-Polynesian language spoken by the Idaʼan people on the east coast of Sabah, Malaysia.

== Background ==
The language has a long literary history; the earliest known work in the language is a manuscript dated 1408 A.D. The manuscript, written using the Jawi script, gives an account of an Idaʼan man named Abdullah in Darvel Bay who embraced Islam, with the region thus becoming one of the earliest known regions in Malaysia to embrace Islam. The Idaʼan, Begak and Subpan peoples originally formed one ethnic group. The Idaʼan converted to Islam following the conversion of Abdullah, while the Begak and Subpan continued to practice their traditional religion.

== Varieties ==
The Idaʼan language has been described as having three dialects: Idaʼan proper (spoken in Sagama and several villages west of Lahad Datu), Begak (spoken in Ulu Tungku and several villages east of Lahad Datu), and Subpan (spoken in the districts of Kinabatangan and Sandakan). These dialects correspond to three ethnic groups who originally formed a single group.

Lobel (2016) lists Sungai Seguliud and Begak as Idaanic languages (language varieties closely related to Idaʼan proper). The Begak dialect is said to be threatened with extinction, as younger speakers are switching to Malay.

== Phonology ==
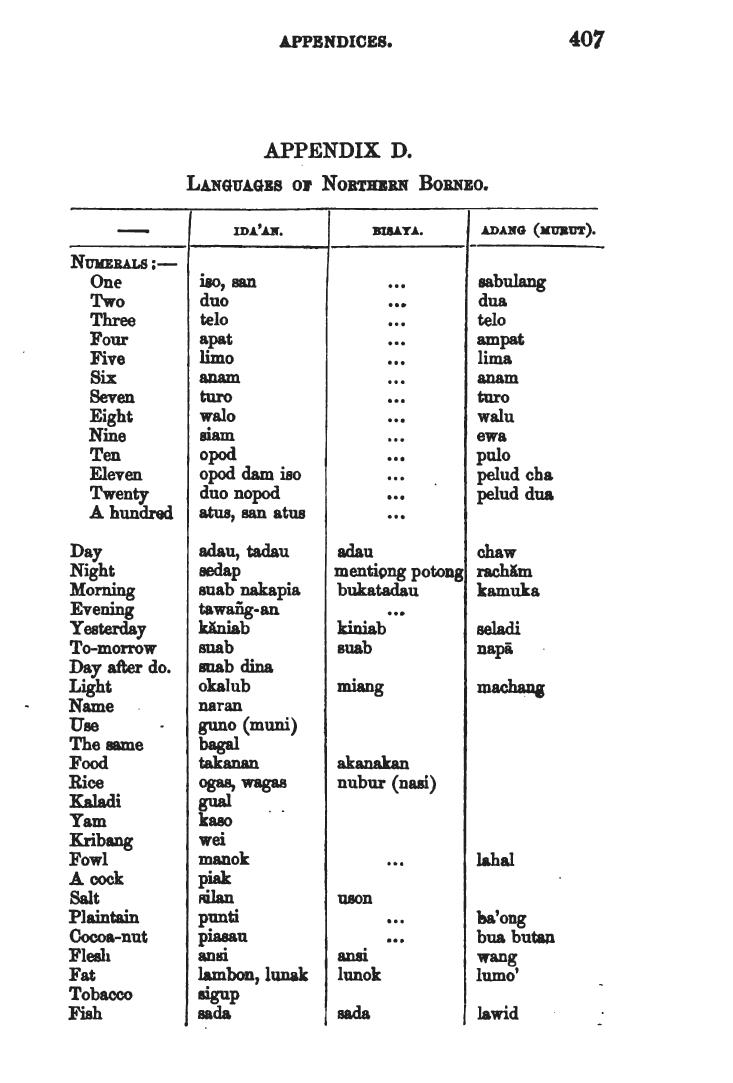
Collection of words in English and translation in Idaʼan, Bisaya and Adang Murut (Lun Bawang) in 1860 by Spencer St.John.

=== Vowels ===
	Front	Central	Back
High	i		u
Mid	e	ə	o
Low		a	

=== Consonants ===
		Bilabial	Alveolar	Palatal	Velar	Glottal
Nasal		m	n		ŋ	
Plosive/ Affricate	Voiceless	p	t	tʃ	k	ʔ
Plosive/ Affricate	Voiced	b	d	dʒ	ɡ	
Fricative			s			
Liquid	Lateral		l			
Liquid	Trill		r			
Semivowel		w		j		

== Sources ==
- Banker, John E. (1984). "The Idaʼan language". In King, Julie K.; King, John Wayne (eds.). Languages of Sabah: A Survey Report. Pacific Linguistics C-78. Canberra: Department of Linguistics, Research School of Pacific Studies, Australian National University. pp. 85–90. doi:10.15144/PL-C78.85.
- Goudswaard, Nelleke Elisabeth (2005). The Begak (Idaʼan) Language of Sabah. Utrecht Institute of Linguistics / LOT Netherlands Graduate School of Linguistic. ISBN 90-76864-73-X.
