= Momogun language =

Austronesian language spoken in Sabah, Malaysia

Momogun
- Native to: Malaysia
- Region: Sabah
- Ethnicity: Dusun and Rungus peoples
- Native speakers: 90,000 (2007–2009)
- Language family: Austronesian: Malayo-Polynesian; North Bornean; Southwest Sabahan; Dusunic; Dusun; Momogun

Language codes
- ISO 639-3: Variously: kqr – Kimaragang (Marigang, Sonsogon) tgb – Tobilung (Tebilung) drg – Rungus (Momogun) kzs – Sugut Dusun (?) mqq – Minokok (?)
- Glottolog: kima1244 Kimaragang tobi1239 Tobilung rung1259 Rungus

Kimaragang (Marigang), Tobilung, and Rungus are varieties of a single Austronesian language of Sabah, Malaysia. The three varieties share moderate mutual intelligibility. Children are not learning it well in some areas.

== Phonology ==
Consonants
		Labial	Alveolar	Post-alv./ Palatal	Velar	Glottal
Nasal		m	n		ŋ	
Plosive	voiceless	p	t		k	ʔ
Plosive	voiced	b	d		ɡ	
Affricate	voiceless		ts			
Affricate	voiced		dz	dʒ		
Fricative	voiceless		s			h
Fricative	voiced	v	z			
Lateral			l	ɭ̆		
Approximant				j		

/ɭ̆/ may also be heard as [l] in word-final positions.

Vowels
	Front	Central	Back
Close	i		u
Mid	e		o
Open		a	
