= Dusunic languages =

Language group of Borneo

Dusunic
- Dusun-Bisaya
- Geographic distribution: Sabah
- Linguistic classification: Austronesian: Malayo-Polynesian; North Bornean; Southwest Sabahan; Dusunic
- Subdivisions: Bisaya–Lotud; Dusunic proper

Language codes
- Glottolog: dusu1277 Dusunic bisa1270 Bisaya–Lotud

The Dusunic languages are a group of languages spoken by the Bisaya and Dusun (including Kadazan and Rungus), and related peoples in the Malaysian state of Sabah in Borneo.

== Languages ==
The Dusunic languages are classified as follows.

- Bisaya–Lotud: Brunei Bisaya, Sabah Bisaya, Lotud
- Dusun: Central Dusun–Talantang–Coastal Kadazan, Kuijau, Labuk-Kinabatangan Kadazan, Kimaragang–Tebilung–Rungus, Klias River Kadazan

Dumpas may also belong here.

Not all languages spoken by the Dusun people belong to this group. In addition, the East Barito languages include several lects spoken by distantly related Bornean groups, also named "Dusun".

=== Lobel (2016) ===
Lobel (2016) covers the following Dusunic languages:

- Rungus
- Kadazan Papar
- Kadazan Kimanis
- Kadazan Membakut
- Kujau
- Minokok
- Lingkabau
- Sungai Kinabatangan
- Dusun Talantang
- Dusun Tambunan
- Dusun Tobilung
- Dusun Liwan
- Dusun Bundu
- Dumpas

=== Dusunic Language Family Tree ===
- Dusunic Languages Family (branched off from Dusunic-Murutic proto language)
  - Bisaya-Lotud Sub-Family
    - Bisayic Languages Group [retain original Proto-Dusunic "ma" prefix in adjective words (for example "maitom" for "black") similar to Murutic. Bisaya and Tatana languages quite resemble the Murut language, sometime grouped in the Greater Murutic languages but in fact, they retained the original Proto-Dusunic form which likely similar to Murutic in its early form]
      - Bisaya (Borneo) language
        - Brunei-Limbang Bisaya dialect
        - Sabah Bisaya dialect
      - Tatana language
      - Klias-Membakut language (the original before shifted to Kadazan)
    - Kadayanic Languages Group [modified "ma" prefix in adjective words to "a" ("maitom" to "aitom")]
      - Brunei Dusun language
        - Coastal Brunei Dusun dialect
        - Upland Brunei Dusun dialect
      - Kadayan (Dusunic) language
        - Papar Kadayan dialect (the original one before shifted to the present Kadazan, a type Z&V language originated from Nunuk Ragang)
        - Manggatal Kadayan dialect (now fully shifted to standard Dusun)
        - Lotud dialect
        - Kiundu-Topokon Kadayan dialect
        - Tempasuk Kadayan dialect
      - Nunuk Ragang Language [Nunuk Ragang language developed from Kadayan language which later became a separate language after long period of west coast-east separation. Nunuk Ragang language also was a product of mixing of Kadayan with Tombonuo (Paitanic) language and unknown language (maybe Idaanic spoken by Bedaro people in Labuk river). That is why Nunuk Ragang languages contain dual-words for things, such as "darun" (Paitanic) and "rasam" (Kadayan-Dusunic) for "rain"]
        - Type Z&V dialect
        - Type Y&W dialect
  - Nunuk Ragang languages sub-family [developed when Kadayan-speaking group migrated from Brunei or Sabah west coast to the east coast region in Nunuk Ragang, located in the upper reach of Labuk river approximately in the 14th century. 300 years later, Nunuk Ragang evolved to various languages and dialects after the Out of Nunuk Ragang migrations]
    - Type Z&V Nunuk Ragang Languages Group [descendants of the early phase of migration out of Nunuk Ragang]
      - Rungus-Sonsogon group (migrated northward)
        - Rungus language
        - Sonsogon language
      - Kuriyou group
        - Kwijau language
        - Kuriyou language (Monsok River Dusun)
        - Tambunan Z&V type Nunuk Ragang lects (Polupu, Gunak, Kohub, Pahu - extinct or shifted to Liwan Dusun. These group was the first to settle in Tambunan before type Y&W-speaking Bundu-Liwan and Tuhawon arrived to the area)
      - Minokok group (migrated southward)
        - Minokok-Tompizos language
      - Labuk-Kinabatangan group [migrated eastward and using "tangar"(Paitanic) instead of "boros" (Dusunic)]
        - Labuk Dusun language
        - Mangkaak language
        - Sukang language
        - Balat Tindakon language
        - Lamag Dusun language (loss Z&V but still in Labuk-Kinabatangan Dusun form of language)
        - Dumpas language (heavily mixed with Paitanic language but basically still a Dusunic language)
      - Kadazan group [Kadazan language was a product of mixing between type Z&V language (highlanders Kuriyou or Kuizou) with Kadayan (plain-dwellers) in Papar. "Kadazan" word is the Kuizou pronunciation of "Kadayan." While this language highly based on Kuriyou dialect, some Kadayan word such as "izing" (cat) and "zadaan" (stomach) was reatained. While other Z&V languages apply "ld" lexicon (for example "mudli"), Kadazan lost this feature. It also extensively using Z&V fricative until losing the use of consonant R]
        - Kadazan (Proper) language
          - Papar Kadazan
          - Penampang Kadazan (before shifting to Kadazan language, Penampang's Tangara people spoke Y&W type Bundu-Liwan while Bangkaakon using Z&V Labuk-Kinabatangan Dusun)
        - Membakut-Klias Kadazan (also known as Kuizou or Kuizau, indicate that the Kadazan of Membakut came from Papar. This language was a product of assimilation by Kuizou with the original Babakud people who speaks language similar to Tatana or Bisaya. Evidence of this claim based on Bisayic form of Membakut Kadazan language (using prefix "ma"), for example "magazo" ("big") instead of "agazo" (typical Kadazan))
    - Type Y&W Nunuk Ragang Languages [modified from type Z&V form as a result of centuries of separation with the speakers of the language - at the time type Z&V leaved Nunuk Ragang, some group stayed and only migrated out later, enough time to change to Y&W form]
      - Maragang-Tobilung group
        - Kimaragang language
          - Kimaragang (Proper)
          - Sandayo
        - Tobilung language
          - Tobilung
      - Central Dusun group
        - Talantang-Tuhawon language
          - Talantang
          - Tuhawon
        - Ulu Sugut Dusun language
          - Tinagas
          - Tilau-Ilau
          - Lingkabau
          - Kogosingan
          - Gopu
          - Luba-Tonduk
          - Gobukon
        - Bundu-Liwan language
          - Liwan
            - Liwan (Proper)
            - Inobong Dusun/Potiang
          - Bundu
            - Bundu (Proper)
            - Sinulihan
            - Tindal
            - Tagahas
