= Orang Sungei =

Indigenous ethnic group of Borneo

Sungai Abai Sungai
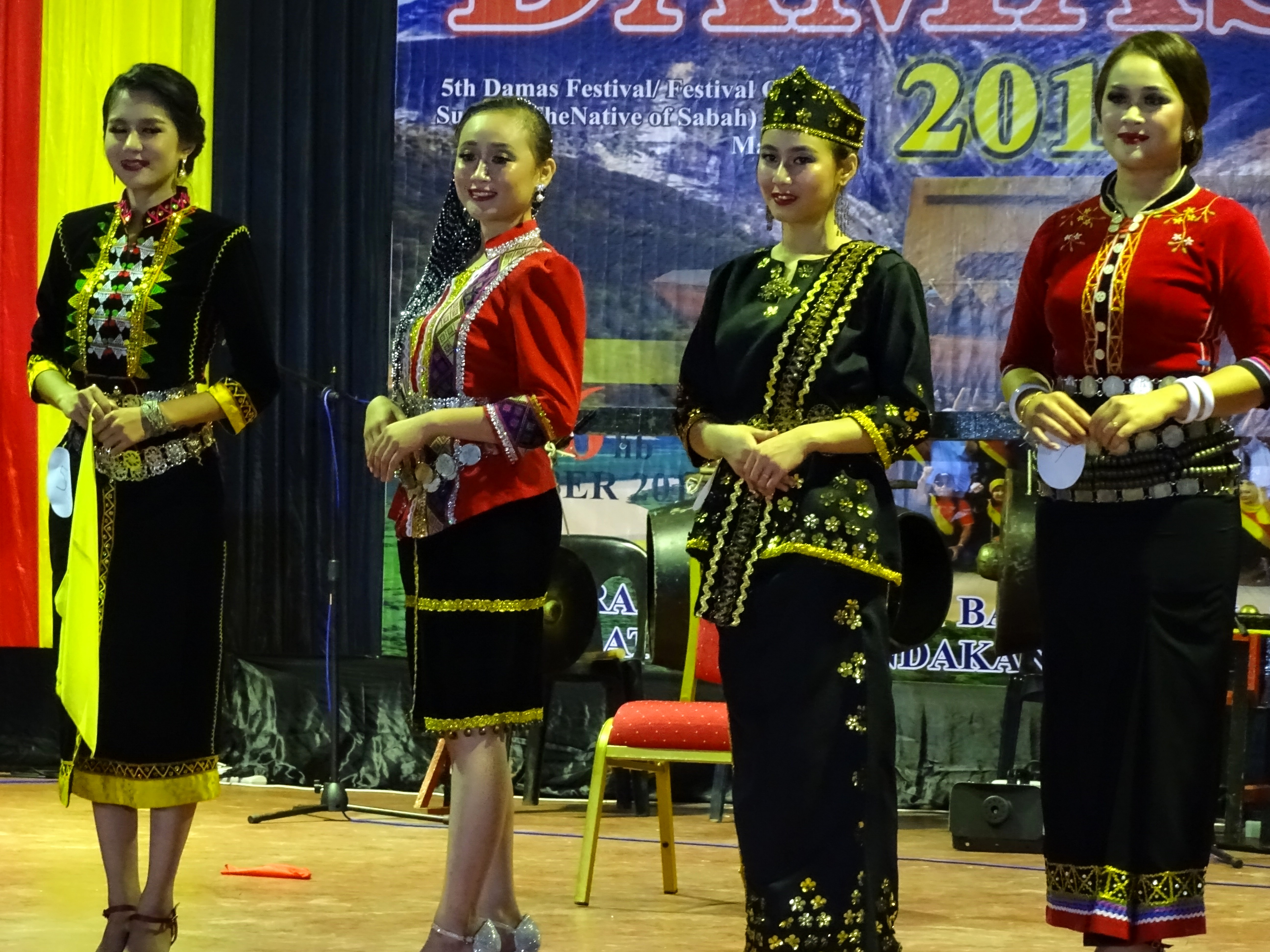
- The Sungei (first row on right side) female in their traditional dress

Regions with significant populations
- Malaysia (Sabah)

Languages
- Native; Sungei; Also; Sabah Malay • Standard Malay • English

Religion
- Islam (Sunni) (predominantly); Christianity (Protestant and Roman Catholic); Animism

Related ethnic groups
- Paitanic related peoples; (Paitan; Tombonuo; Ida'an; Bagahak); Kadazan-Dusun • Rungus • Murut • Dayak • other Austronesian peoples

The Orang Sungei, or Orang Sungai (lit. 'River people') are an Austronesian ethnic group indigenous to Sabah, Malaysia. This group of communities live along the rivers of Kinabatangan, Beluran (Labuk), Kudat, Pitas and Lahad Datu districts, hence where their ethnic name originated.

== Etymology ==
The "Sungai or Sungei" ethnic name is taken based on their settlements, which can be found along the river in northeastern Sabah's coast. In Gomantong and Segama, the Sungai also refers to themselves as the "Bulud Upi" (Buludupi Sungei). The name "Orang Sungei" is a collective term that was coined during the British rule for communities living along the Kinabatangan River. In some cases like the Tombonuo people would refer to themselves as Orang Sungei for those who are Muslims; unless if they are not Muslims, then they would identify themselves by their tribal name. Whereas tribes like the Ida'an people are sometimes regarded as part of the Orang Sungei historically because of their common linguistic origins.

== Background history and origin ==
Among the first documented encounters throughout the British rule with the Orang Sungei tribe was during the expedition by the first British Resident of Sandakan, William Burgess Pryer, along the Kinabatangan River to Labok Village (Kampung Labok), where they referred to the local indigenous people living along the river with shoulder-length hair and reddish skin as "river people" in English. Throughout the administration of the North Borneo Chartered Company (NBCC), the name was also translated to "Orang Sungei/Sungai" in the Malay language. The name remains in use to this day and becomes the official ethnic name, where it is also used to refer to other groups who also live on the banks of other rivers. The Orang Sungei can be divided into three main groups, namely the Paitanic Sungei, Dusunic Sungei, and Ida'an Sungei. The Paitanic Sungei are the community who live in the area around the Paitan River (which passes through the Beluran, Pitas and Kota Marudu districts). (Note: The Ida'an, Begahak (Bagahak), and Sungei ethnic groups are interconnected, as they can comprehend and communicate in their respective languages. The primary religious distinction between the Begahak and Sungai tribes is that they may identify as either Muslim or Christian, whereas the Ida'an ethnic group predominantly practices Islam. The Ida'an ethnic group is divided into three subfamilies according to religion, language, and geographical location. Indigenous Sungei inhabitants of the Lahad Datu District who practice Islam are usually referred to as the Ida'an ethnic group, whereas those residing in Tungku are identified as the Begahak, and individuals in the Sandakan and Kinabatangan regions are termed the "Orang Sungei"; additionally, the Ida'an subfamily comprises those living in the Kinabatangan vicinity, including the villages of Abai, Bilit, Segaliud, and Suan Lamba.)

== Culture ==
The Sungei ethnic group lived along the rivers of the eastern coast, with their main traditional occupation in agriculture. In 2016, the first cultural village for the ethnic in Sukau was set to be established, which has been approved by the state government of Sabah. These ethnicities were once rich with plenty of customs and taboos regarding their social life aspects before their massive Islamisation and Christianisation, where they were once a strong believer of witchcraft, although they are now no longer practised among the modern Sungei generations. There is a traditional beliefs among the Sungei people along the Kinabatangan, Paitan, Labuk, Kudat, and Lahad Datu rivers that burying belangkas (Horseshoe crab) shells in their gardens will increase soil fertility. The Sungei in Sukau celebrated an annual Damas festival, an ethnic festival that includes boat events. Among the Orang Sungei community of the Kinabatangan River, they have a musical instrument named gabang and two large kantung (vertical slit gongs) that stand about a metre tall.

== Notable people ==
- Bung Moktar Radin (1959–2025) – former Deputy Chief Minister of Sabah and former member of parliament for Kinabatangan.
- Bolkiah Ismail – former Sabah state assistant minister from 2008 to 2018 and short-lived cabinet minister in 2018.
- Harun Durabi – Sabah state assistant minister.
- Suhaimi Nasir – member of parliament for Libaran.
- Abdul Rahim Bakri – former Malaysian federal cabinet deputy minister.
- Noki K-Clique – Sabahan famous hip-hop rapper, also of partial Kedayan descent through father.
- Samad Jambri – Sabah state assistant minister.

== See also ==
- Tombonuo people
