= Papar language =

Austronesian language spoken in Sabah, Malaysia

Papar
- Native to: Malaysia
- Region: Sabah
- Ethnicity: 1,900 (2015)
- Native speakers: 500 (2015) (Elderly adults)
- Language family: Austronesian: Malayo-Polynesian; North Bornean; Southwest Sabahan; Greater Murutic; Papar
- Writing system: Unwritten

Language codes
- ISO 639-3: dpp
- Glottolog: papa1268

Papar is a minor Austronesian language spoken in Sabah, Malaysia.
