= Sabahan languages =

Group of languages

Sabahan
- Geographic distribution: Northern Borneo
- Linguistic classification: Austronesian: Malayo-Polynesian; Greater North Bornean?; North Bornean; Sabahan

Language codes
- Glottolog: saba1285

The Sabahan languages are a group of Austronesian languages mostly concentrated in the Malaysian state of Sabah, but also extended into neighbouring Sarawak of Malaysia, North Kalimantan of Indonesia, and the sovereign state of Brunei.

== Languages ==
=== Blust (2010) ===
The constituents are separated into two families in Blust (2010):

Northeast Sabahan

- Bonggi
- Ida'an

Southwest Sabahan

- Dusunic (15)
- Paitanic (4)
- Murutic (7)
- Tidong (5)

=== Lobel (2013) ===
Lobel (2013b, p. 47, 361) proposes the following internal classification of Southwest Sabahan, based on phonological and morphological evidence.

- Greater Dusunic
  - Dusunic
  - Bisaya-Lotud
  - Paitanic
- Greater Murutic
  - Murutic
  - Tatana
  - Papar

Lobel (2013:367–368) lists the following Proto-Southwest Sabahan phonological innovations that were developed from Proto-Malayo-Polynesian. (Note: PSWSAB stands for Proto-Southwest Sabahan, while PMP stands for Proto-Malayo-Polynesian.)

- PMP *h > PSWSAB Ø
- PMP *a > PSWSAB *ə / _# (possibly be an areal feature in Sabah or northern Borneo, since this is also found in Idaanic)
- PMP *R > PSWSAB *h / (a,i,u)_(a,ə,u)
- PMP *R > PSWSAB *g / ə_
- PMP *-m- > ø in PSWSAB reflexes of the PMP pronoun forms *kami '1EXCL.NOM', *mami '1EXCL.GEN', and *kamu '2PL.NOM'
- Reduction of most PMP consonant clusters to either singletons or prenasalized clusters

=== Smith (2017) ===
Smith (2017) proposes a North Borneo group comprising the North Sarawak, Northeast Sabah, and Southwest Sabah branches.

- North Sarawak
  - Bintulu
  - Berawan–Lower Baram
  - Dayic
  - Kenyah
- Northeast Sabah (Bonggi, Idaanic)
- Southwest Sabah
  - Greater Dusunic
    - Bisaya–Lotud–Dusunic
      - Bisaya–Lotud (Sabah and Limbang Bisaya, Brunei Dusun, Lotud)
      - Dusunic (Bundu, Liwan, Tindal, Tobilung, Rungus, Kadazan, Kujau, Minokok, Dumpas, etc)
    - Paitanic (Beluran, Lingkabau, Lobu, Kuamut, Murut Serudong)
  - Greater Murutic
    - Tatana
    - Papar
    - Murutic (Murut (Nabaay, Timugon, Paluan, Tagol, Kalabakan), Gana, Tingalan, Kolod, Abai, Bulusu, Tidung (Bengawong, Sumbol, Kalabakan, Mensalong, Malinau))
