= Bonggi language =

Austronesian language spoken in Sabah, Malaysia

Bonggi
- Native to: Malaysia
- Region: Sabah
- Ethnicity: 1,400 (1990)
- Native speakers: Unknown
- Language family: Austronesian: Malayo-Polynesian; North Bornean; Northeast Sabahan; Bonggi

Language codes
- ISO 639-3: bdg
- Glottolog: bong1289
- Location of Banggi Island, where Banggi is spoken. Bonggi language (Malaysia)
- Coordinates: 7°15′0″N 117°10′0″E

Bonggi (Banggi) is an Austronesian language spoken primarily by the Bonggi people of Banggi Island, off the northern tip of Sabah, Malaysia.

== Orthography ==
=== Vowels and diphthongs ===
- a – [a/ã/ə̃], [ə] unstressed
- e – [e/ə]
- i – [i/ɪ]
- o – [o/ɔ/ɔ̃]
- u – [u/ʊ]
- aa – [aː]
- ee – [eː]
- ii – [iː]
- oo – [ɔː]
- uu – [uː]
- ai – [aj/ai]
- ou – [ou]

=== Consonants ===
- b – [b], [β] between vowels, [bʷ/βʷ] before u
- d – [d], [dʲ] before i
- f – [f]
- g – [g], [gʷ] before u
- h – [k/h], [hʲ] before i, [ʔ] at the end of a word
- j – [j/d͡ʒ]
- k – [k/k']
- l – [l], [lʲ] before i
- m – [m/mʷ]
- n – [n/dn/n]
- ng – [ŋ]
- p – [p/ɸ/ɸʷ]
- r – [ɾ/r]
- s – [s]
- t – [t/t']
- w – [w]
- y – [j]

At the ends of words, k, p, and t are not released.
