= Ainu in Russia =

Indigenous people of far-eastern Russia

Ainu
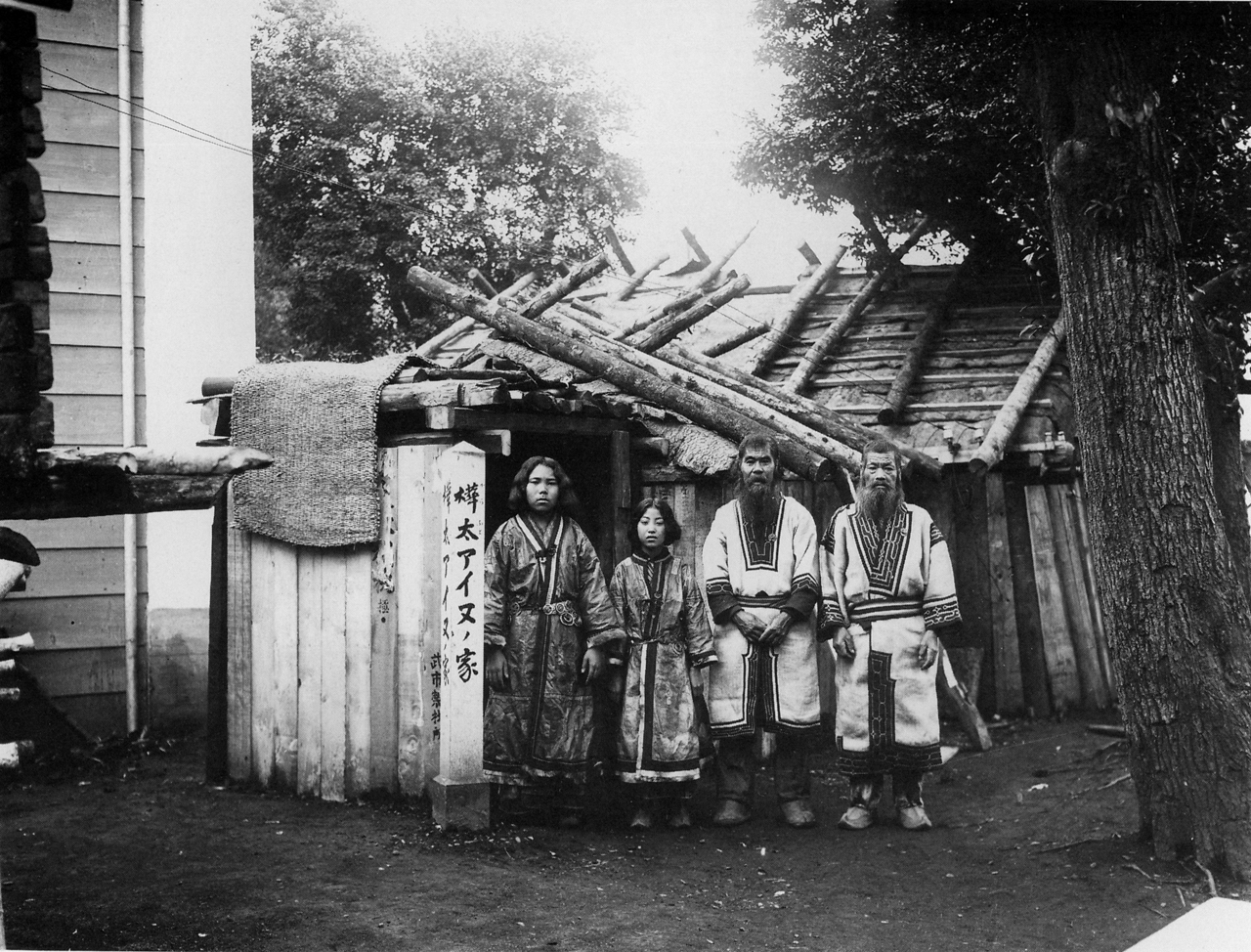
- Karafuto Ainu house at the Colonisation Exposition in Tokyo, 1912

Total population
- 300 (2021 census)

Regions with significant populations
- Sakhalin Oblast, Khabarovsk Krai and Kamchatka Krai

Languages
- Russian, formerly Ainu languages (Kuril, Sakhalin), Itelmen, and Nivkh languages

Religion
- Russian Orthodox and Shamanism (see Ainu mythology)

Related ethnic groups
- Hokkaido Ainu, Kamchadals, Ryukyuans, Jōmon, Matagi

The Ainu in Russia are an Indigenous people of Siberia located in Sakhalin Oblast, Khabarovsk Krai and Kamchatka Krai. The Russian Ainu people (also Aine; Russian: айны, romanized: Ayny), also called Kurile (курилы, kurily), Kamchatka's Kurile (камчатские курилы, kamchatskiye kurily / камчадальские айны, kamchadalskiye ayny) or Eine (эйны, eyny), can be subdivided into six groups.

Although only around 100 people currently identify themselves as Ainu in Russia (according to the census of 2010), it is believed that at least 1,000 people are of significant Ainu ancestry. The low numbers identifying as Ainu are a result of the refusal by the government of the Russian Federation to recognise the Ainu as a "living" ethnic group. Most of the people who identify themselves as Ainu live in Kamchatka Krai, although the largest number of people who are of Ainu ancestry (without acknowledging it) are found in Sakhalin Oblast. Many local people are ethnically Ainu or have significant Ainu ancestry but identify as Russian or Nivkh and speak Russian as mother tongue, often not knowing of their Ainu ancestry.

== History ==
The Sakhalin Ainu used the autonym Enchiw to distinguish themselves from other Ainu.

=== Ming and Qing periods ===
Due to Ming rule in Manchuria, Chinese cultural and religious influence such as Chinese New Year, "the Chinese god", and motifs such as dragons, spirals, and scrolls spread among the Ainu, Nivkh, and Amur natives such as the Udeghe, Ulchi, and Nanai. These groups also adopted material goods and practices such as agriculture, husbandry, heating technologies, iron cookpots, silk, and cotton.

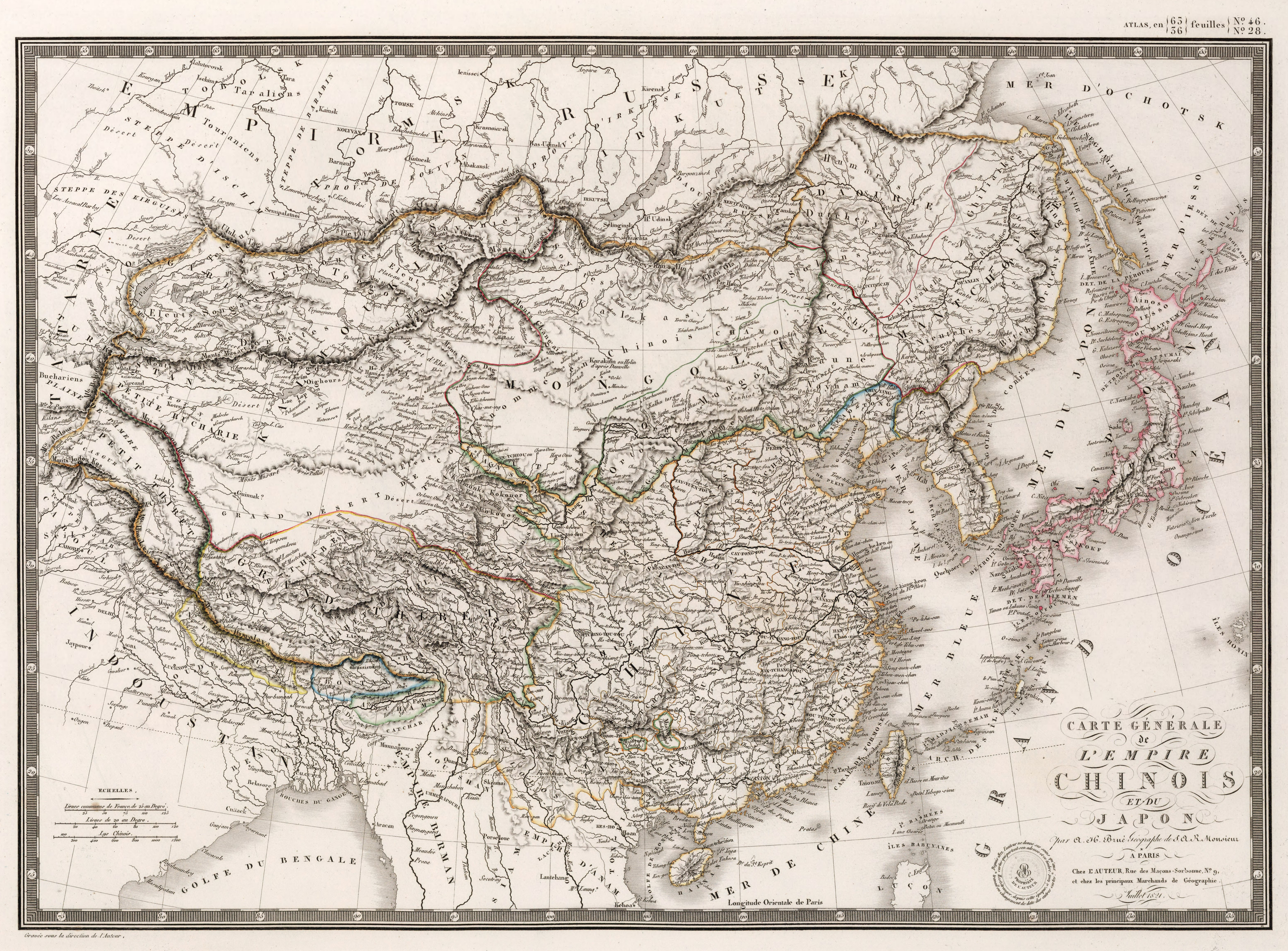
French map from 1821 shows Sakhalin as part of Qing Empire, and the Kuril Islands are a part of Japan.

Qing China, which the Manchu people established in 1644, called Sakhalin "Kuyedao" (Chinese: 庫頁島; pinyin: Kùyè dǎo; lit. 'island of the Ainu') or "Kuye Fiyaka" (ᡴᡠᠶᡝ
ᡶᡳᠶᠠᡴᠠ). The Manchus called it Sagaliyan ula angga hada 'Island at the Mouth of the Black River'. The Qing first asserted influence over Sakhalin after the 1689 Treaty of Nerchinsk, which defined the Stanovoy Range as the border between the Qing and the Russian Empire. In the following year the Qing sent forces to the Amur estuary and demanded that the residents, including the Sakhalin Ainu, pay tribute. This was followed by several further visits to the island as part of the Qing effort to map the area. To enforce its influence, the Qing sent soldiers and mandarins across Sakhalin, reaching most parts of the island except the southern tip. The Qing imposed a fur-tribute system on the region's inhabitants.

The Qing dynasty ruled these regions by imposing upon them a fur tribute system, just as had the Yuan and Ming dynasties. Residents who were required to pay tributes had to register according to their hala (ᡥᠠᠯᠠ, the clan of the father's side) and gashan (ᡤᠠᡧᠠᠨ, village), and a designated chief of each unit was put in charge of district security as well as the annual collection and delivery of fur. By 1750, fifty-six hala and 2,398 households were registered as fur tribute payers, – those who paid with fur were rewarded mainly with Nishiki silk brocade, and every year the dynasty supplied the chief of each clan and village with official silk clothes (mangpao, duanpao), which were the gowns of the mandarin. Those who offered especially large fur tributes were granted the right to create a familial relationship with officials of the Manchu Eight Banners (at the time equivalent to Chinese aristocrats) by marrying an official's adopted daughter. Further, the tribute payers were allowed to engage in trade with officials and merchants at the tribute location. By these policies, the Qing dynasty brought political stability to the region and established the basis for commerce and economic development.

— Shiro Sasaki

The Qing dynasty established an office in Ningguta, situated midway along the Mudan River, to handle fur from the lower Amur and Sakhalin. Tribute was supposed to be brought to regional offices, but the lower Amur and Sakhalin were considered too remote, so the Qing sent officials directly to these regions every year to collect tribute and to present awards. By the 1730s, the Qing had appointed senior figures among the indigenous communities as "clan chief" (hala-i-da) or "village chief" (gasan-da or mokun-da). In 1732, 6 hala, 18 gasban, and 148 households were registered as tribute bearers in Sakhalin. Manchu officials gave tribute missions rice, salt, other necessities, and gifts during the duration of their mission. Tribute missions occurred during the summer months. During the reign of the Qianlong Emperor (r. 1735–1795), a trade post existed at Deren, upstream of Kiji (Kizi) Lake, according to Rinzo Mamiya. There were 500–600 people at the market during Mamiya's stay there.

Local native Sakhalin chiefs had their daughters taken as wives by Manchu officials as sanctioned by the Qing dynasty when the Qing exercised jurisdiction in Sakhalin and took tribute from them.

=== Russian expansion to Kamchatka ===
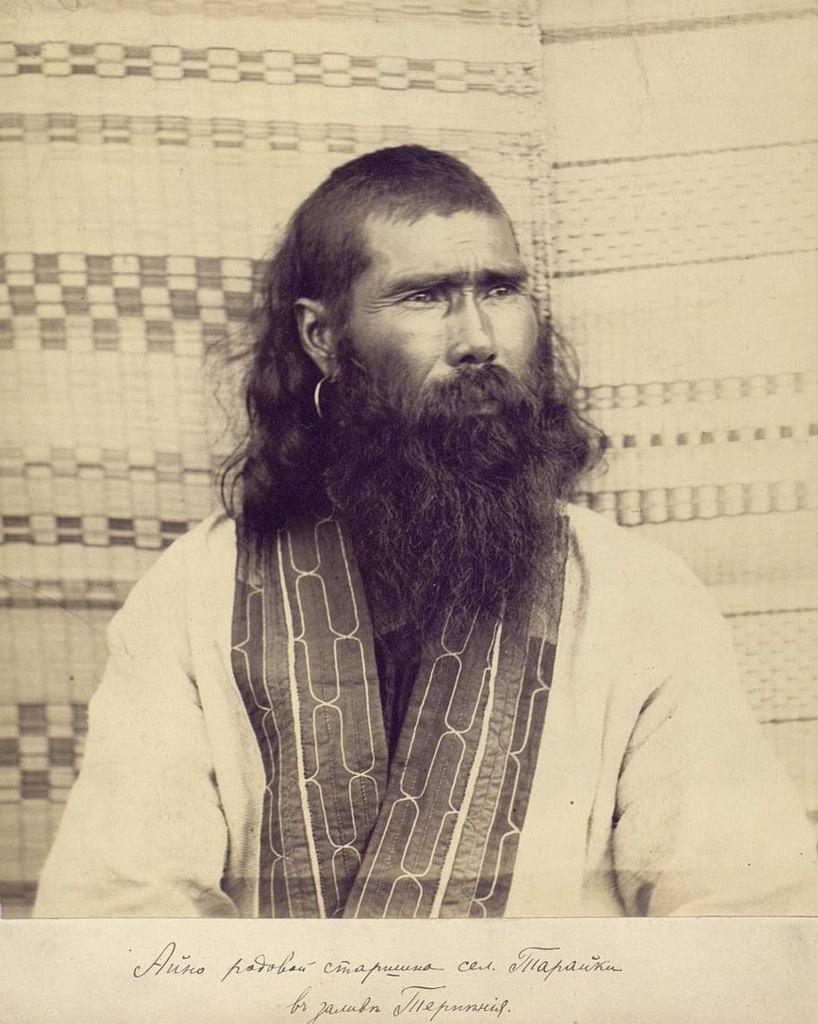
Sakhalin Ainu chief, c. 1885–1899

Ainu trading expeditions with the Kamchatka Peninsula and other northern regions which today are part of Russia began very early on, despite the traditionally sedentary customs of Ainu society. Ainu migrations to Kamchatka and the Amur River area from Hokkaido were increasingly limited after the 16th century however, as Japanese merchants and officials increasingly limited their ability to migrate.

Through continual contact and trade with other indigenous groups on the Kamchatka peninsula, such as the Aleuts, Chukchi, Itelmens, and Yupik, the Ainu of the northern Kuril Islands often spoke other languages alongside Ainu as well as adopting and developing clothing styles and boat building that shared similarities with these other groups and diverged from the material culture of the Ainu inhabiting the southern Kuril Islands and Hokkaido. The Ainu in the southern Kuril Islands engaged in trade relations with Japanese people, often trading hunted seal skins for Japanese dishware and side arms.

The Kamchatka Ainu first came into contact with Russian fur traders by the end of the 17th century. With Ivan Petrovich Kozyrevsky conducting the first Russian expedition to the Kuril islands in 1713. Contact with the Amur Valley Ainu in the 18th century. Russians began to settle on the northern Kuril Islands during the 18th century. During Martin Spanberg's Great Northern Expedition, he visited many of the Kuril Islands, baptising many Ainu. By mid-18th century more than 1,500 Ainu had accepted Russian citizenship.

During this period the Ainu acted as crucial parties to Russian-Japanese relations, where they participated as guides in expeditions, provided information about Japan and Russia to each other, acted as translators between Russian and Japanese individuals, and provided intermediary trade services. The importance of the Ainu in facilitating contact between Russians and Japanese is recorded in Russian images depicting official meetings at the time, where the Ainu were included alongside Russian and Japanese figures.

From 1778 to 1779 a Russian delegation met with Japanese individuals at trading posts in northern Hokkaido. Japanese and Russian records of the meeting detailed how, despite two Russian individuals being able to speak Japanese, the discussions were conducted in Ainu. Where a Japanese individual would speak in broken Ainu, then an Ainu individual from Hokkaido would correct it, and Ainu guides who had come from the Kuril islands with the Russians would translate it from Ainu to Russian.

From 1785 to 1786, Mogami Tokunai explored Hokkaido, Sakhalin, and the Kuril Islands. He reported that on his visit to Iturup in the Kuril Islands he met multiple Russians who were living there with the Ainu. In 1792, Adam Laxman conducted the first official Russian expedition to Japan meeting with the Matsumae clan in Hokkaido. Due to information that had been continually passed to Russian officials by the Ainu of the Kuril islands, as part of this expedition Laxman was asked to discuss the Menashi–Kunashir rebellion which had occurred three years earlier.

=== Resettlement in the 19th century ===
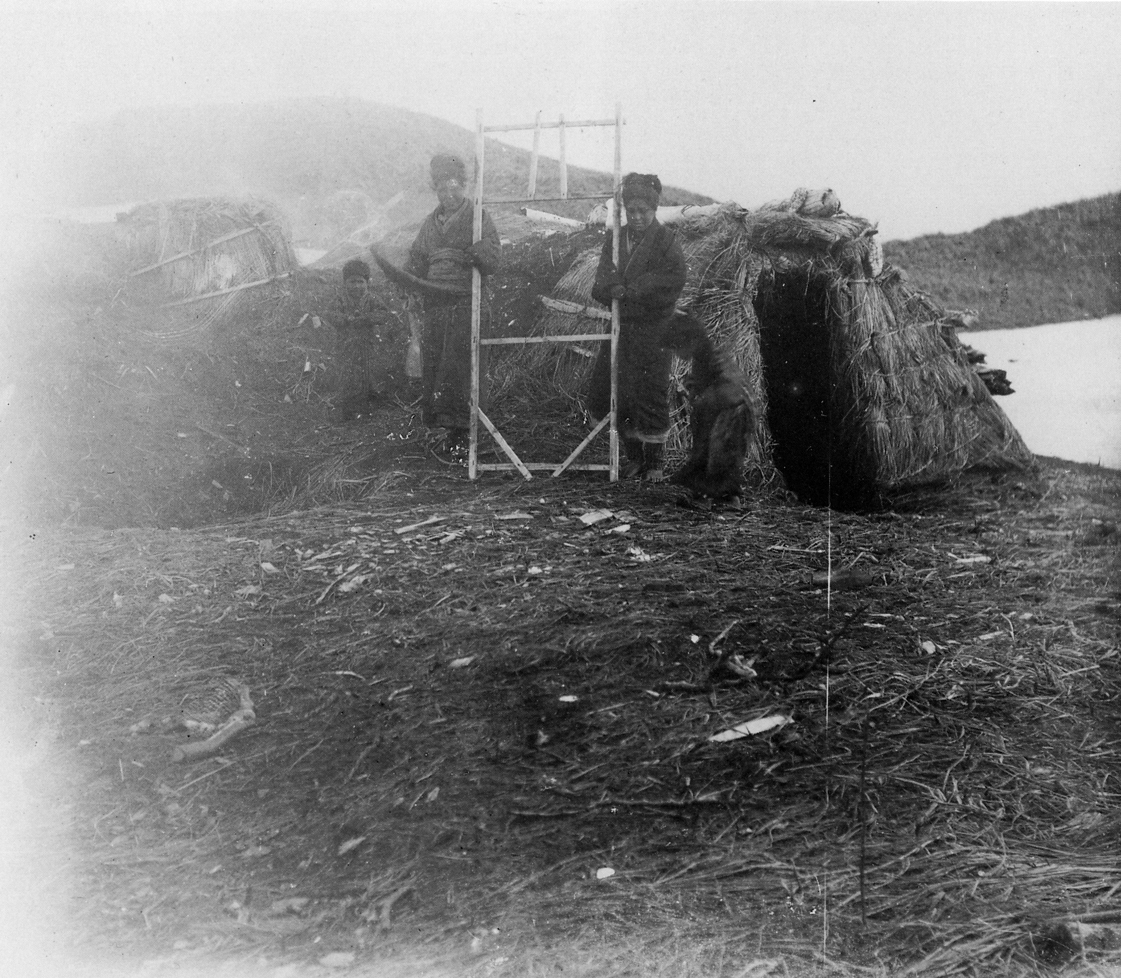
Ainu in the Northern Kuril Islands in front of traditional pit-houses, 1899

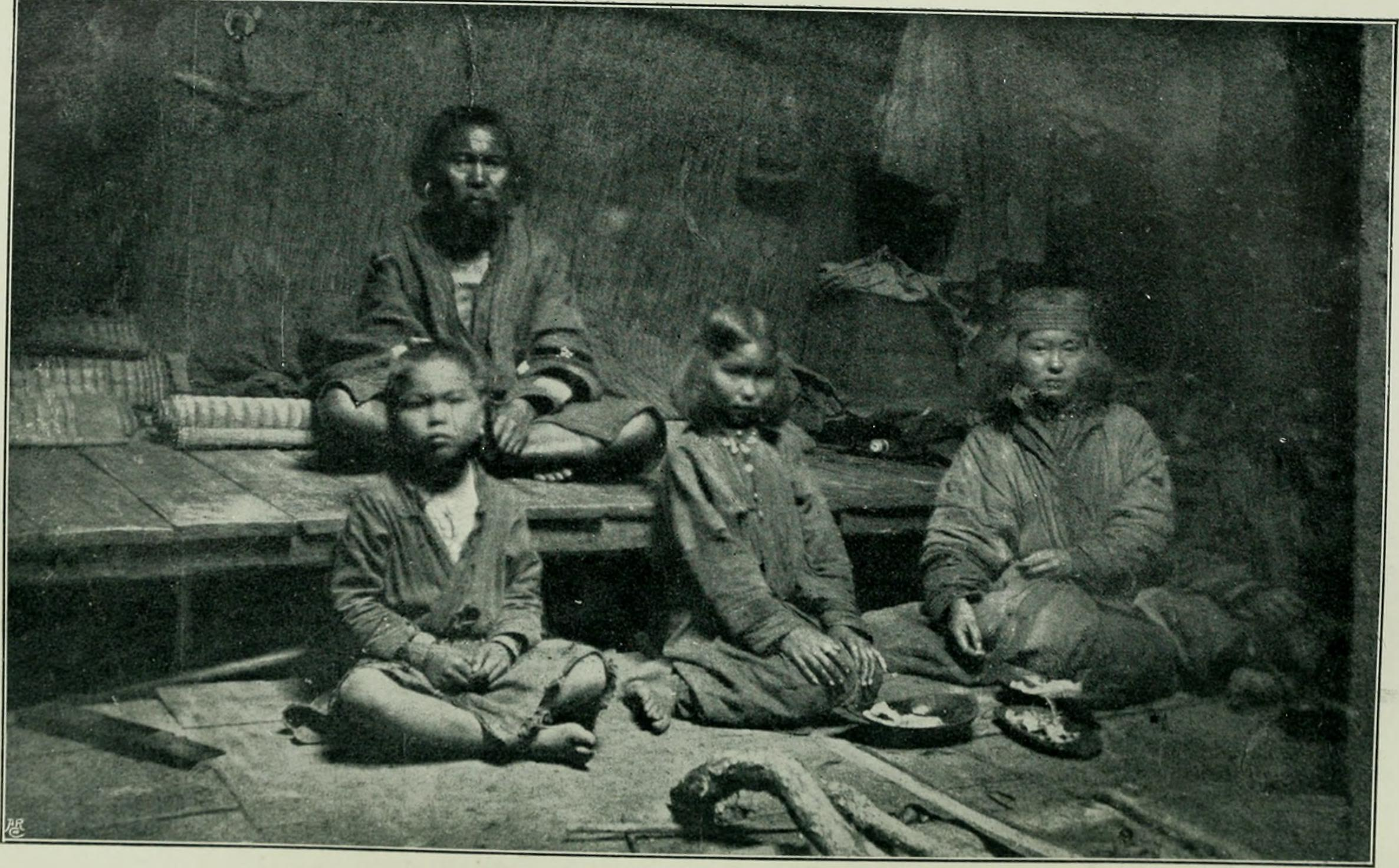
Kuril Ainu people within their traditional dwelling, 1903

When Russian captain Vasily Golovnin visited the northern Kuril Islands in 1811 he reported on meeting Ainu who could speak and read Russian. Due to this, he employed local Ainu into his expedition to act as guides and translators. Golovnin was subsequently arrested by the Japanese for violating sakoku.

In 1858, Russia established a penal colony on the island of Sakhalin. After visiting the island and its penal colony, Russian jurist, historian, and economist Nikolai Novombergskii published Ostrov Sakhalin in 1903, which was critical of the government's actions on the island, reporting on the negative impacts on the native peoples including the Ainu. The prisons had disrupted fishing grounds, Russian settlers prevented native peoples from hunting, and settlers and officials engaged in widespread exploitation of the native peoples.

In 1868, the estimated populations of the Ainu were around 2,000 in Sakhalin, and around 100 across the Kuril Islands.

As a result of the 1875 Treaty of St. Petersburg, Japanese-administered Sakhalin was given to Russia, while the Kuril Islands—along with their Ainu inhabitants—came under Japanese administration. While the treaty recognised the indigenous peoples of Sakhalin and the Kuril Islands as permanent residents, it explicitly denied them any rights as citizens between the two imperial powers.

More than a hundred Ainu left the Kuril Islands for Kamchatka as a result, with a total of 83 North Kuril Ainu arriving in Petropavlovsk-Kamchatsky on 18 September 1877.

The Commander Islands were originally designated as a refuge for the Aleut people (from the islands of Atka, Attu, Fox, Andreanof, etc.), who were forced to flee Alaska after Russia sold it to the US. In 1827, 110 people were living on Bering Island (of which 93 spoke either Aleut or Aleut-Russian creole). Since the Northern Kuril Ainu had a similar experience due to the Treaty of St. Petersburg, the Tsar hoped to resettle them near the Aleut. But the Ainu were skeptical of the offer and rejected it, as they wanted to stay in Kamchatka mainland, whose geography was familiar to them. By 1879, the islands were home to a total of 168 Aleut and 332 Creole, plus around 50 to 60 people from other nationalities including Russians, Komi-Zyrians, Roma, and Kyrgyz. All the Creole spoke the Aleut language, as it was the language of their mothers. The Ainu, along with other minorities were quickly assimilated by the Aleut within a few decades. In 1888, 26 individuals, including Aleuts, Alutiiqs, and North Kuril Ainu, moved from cape Zheltov to Bering Island.

An agreement was reached in 1881 between the North Kuril Ainu and Russian authorities which saw the Ainu settle in the village of Yavin, Kamchatka. In March 1881, the group left Petropavlovsk and began the long journey to Yavin by foot. Four months later, they reached their new homes. Another village, Golygino, was founded later. Nine more Ainu arrived from Japan in 1884. According to the 1897 Census of Russia, Golygino had a population of 57 (all Ainu) and Yavin a population of 39 (33 Ainu & 6 Russian). Later, under Soviet rule both villages were forced to disband, and the inhabitants forcibly moved to the ethnic Russian-dominated Zaporozhye rural settlement in Ust-Bolsheretsky Raion. As a result of intermarriage, the ethnic groups assimilated to form the Kamchadal community.

The Japanese authorities did not trust the Ainu of the formerly Russian controlled Kuril Islands to be loyal to Japan, and so forcefully displaced most of them from the islands to Hokkaido where they were expected to work as farmers for Yamato Japanese landlords. During the transfer of Sakhalin, Japan also forcefully relocated 841 Sakhalin Ainu to Hokkaido (around 35% of the Ainu population of Sakhalin), with many subsequently dying due to the spread of disease in the overcrowded settlements that they were forced in to. Due to these conditions 203 Ainu managed to emigrate back to Sakhalin by 1905. Those Ainu that had remained in Sakhalin lived in the more remote interior of the island, with many married to Russians.

The Ainu (especially those in the Kurils) supported the Russians over the Japanese in conflicts of the 19th century. However, after their defeat during the Russo-Japanese War of 1905, the Russians abandoned their allies and left them to their fate. Hundreds of Ainu were executed and their families were forcibly relocated to Hokkaido by the Japanese.

During the Tsarist period, the Ainu living in Russia were forbidden to identify themselves by that name, since the Japanese officials claimed that all areas inhabited by the Ainu in the past or present belonged to Japan. The Ainu were referred to as "Kurile", "Kamchatka Kurile" or simply as Russian. As a result, many Ainu changed their surnames to Slavic sounding ones.

=== 20th century ===
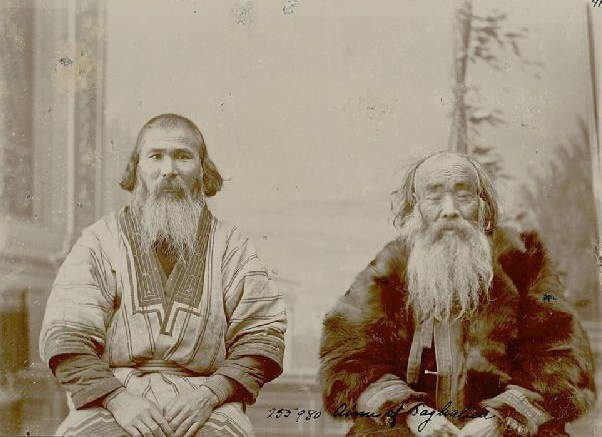
Sakhalin Ainu men, photographed by Bronisław Piłsudski

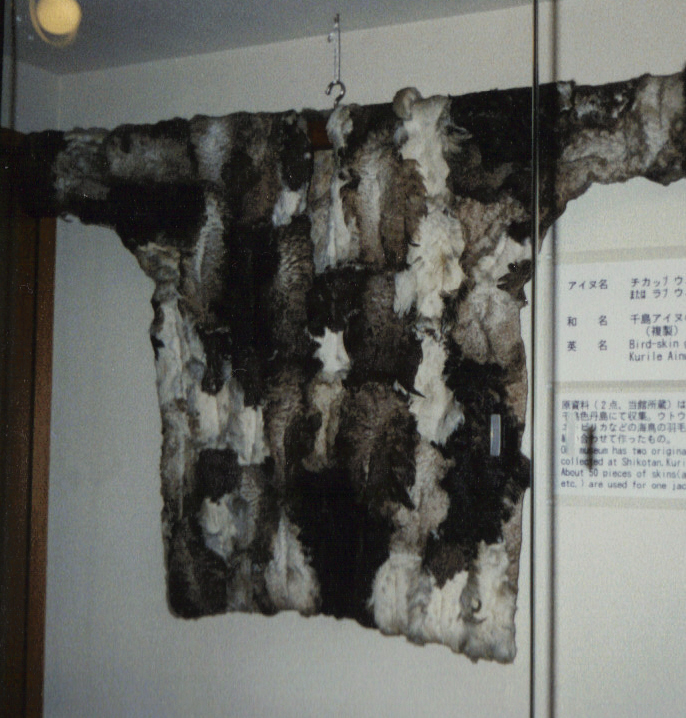
Rapuri, Kuril Ainu bird skin coat

In the early 20th century, Bronisław Piłsudski reported that there were a few Amur Valley Ainu individuals, with many being married to either ethnic Russians or ethnic Ulchi. Only 26 individuals of sole Ainu ancestry were recorded during the 1926 Russian Census in Nikolaevski Okrug.

After the Russo-Japanese War the 1905 Treaty of Portsmouth saw southern Sakhalin annexed by Japan as the Karafuto Prefecture.

The 1933 it was recorded that there were only 41 Southern Kuril Ainu left on the island of Shikotan of the eastern coast of Hokkaido, while the 1935 Japanese census recorded 1,512 Ainu in Sakhalin.

In 1941, the last groups of 20 northern Kuril Ainu were evacuated by Japan to Hokkaidō. During the final year of World War II, Soviet forces Invaded southern Sakhalin, during which Japan evacuated about 100,000 people from Sakhalin, including almost all the Ainu to Hokkaidō. The remaining 300,000 Japanese subjects in southern Sakhalin stayed behind, some for several more years, which may have included isolated Ainu individuals. In 1949, there were about 100 Ainu living on Soviet Sakhalin. Japan renounced its claims of sovereignty over southern Sakhalin and the Kuril Islands in the 1951 Treaty of San Francisco. Soon after World War II the last 50 southern Kuril Ainu were evacuated by Japan to Hokkaidō.

The Soviet authorities removed the Ainu from the list of nationalities which could be mentioned in the passport, as they feared the Ainu could be possible Japanese spies. Due to this, children born after 1945 were not able to identify themselves as Ainu.

The last Southern Kuril Ainu of sole Ainu ancestry was Suyama Nisaku, who died in 1956, with the last person identified as a member of the southern Kuril Ainu, Tanaka Kinu, dying on Hokkaidō in 1973.

On 7 February 1953, K. Omelchenko, the Soviet Minister of the Protection of Military and State Secrets banned the press from publishing any information on the Ainu still living in the USSR. The order was finally revoked after two decades.

In 1979, the USSR removed the term "Ainu" from the list of living ethnic groups of Russia, the government proclaiming that the Ainu as an ethnic group was now extinct in its territory.

The Ainu emphasize that they are the original inhabitants of the Kuril islands and that both the Japanese and Russians were invaders.

=== 21st century ===
According to the 2002 Russian Federation census, no one marked the Ainu option in boxes 7 or 9.2 in the K-1 form.

In 2004, the small Ainu community living in Kamchatka Krai wrote to Vladimir Putin, urging him to reconsider any move to return the Southern Kuril islands to Japan. In the letter, they accused the Japanese, the Tsarist Russians, and the Soviets for crimes against the Ainu, including killings and forced assimilation; they also urged him to recognize the Japanese genocide against the Ainu people. Putin rejected this proposal.

In 2010 the Russian Association of the Far-Eastern Ainu (Note: Russian: Российская ассоциация дальневосточных айнов, romanized: Rossiyskaya assotsiatsiya dal'nevostochnykh aynov) (RADA) was formed to advocate for indigenous rights under Rechkabo Kakukhoningen (Boris Yarovoy). (Note: Russian: Борис Яровой) During the 2010 Census of Russia, almost 100 people tried to register themselves as ethnic Ainu, but the governing council of Kamchatka Krai refused to do so and enrolled them as ethnic Kamchadal. In 2011, the leader of the Ainu community in Kamchatka, Alexei Vladimirovich Nakamura requested that Vladimir Ilyukhin (Governor of Kamchatka) and Boris Nevzorov (Chairman of state Duma) include the Ainu in the central list of Indigenous small-numbered peoples of the North, Siberia and the Far East. This request was also denied.

Most of the 888 Japanese people living in Russia as of 2010, are of mixed Japanese–Ainu ancestry, although they generally do not acknowledge it, since full Japanese ancestry gives them the right of visa-free entry to Japan. Similarly, although no one identifies as Ainu today in Khabarovsk Krai, there are a large number of ethnic Ulch people with partial Ainu ancestry.

According to Alexei Nakamura, as of 2012, Kamchatka Ainu community consisted of 205 Ainu, compared to just 12 people who self-identified as Ainu in the 2008 Russian census. They, along with the Kuril Kamchadals, are fighting for official recognition. Since the Ainu are not recognised in the official list of ethnic groups living in Russia, they are either counted as people without nationality or as ethnic Russian, Nivkh, or Kamchadal. As of 2012, both the Ainu and Kamchadals in Kamchatka and the Kuril Islands lack the fishing and hunting rights that the Russian government grants to the indigenous tribal communities of the far north. In March 2017, Alexei Nakamura revealed that plans for an Ainu village to be created in Petropavlovsk-Kamchatsky and plans for an Ainu dictionary are underway.

As of 2015, the North Kuril Ainu of Zaporozhye form the largest Ainu subgroup in Russia.

== Demographics ==
A flag adopted by some to represent Ainu in Russia.

According to the 2010 Russian census, a total of 109 Ainu lived in Russia. Of this, 94 lived in Kamchatka Krai, 4 in Primorye, 3 in Sakhalin, 1 in Khabarovsk, 4 in Moscow, 1 in St.Petersburg, 1 in Sverdlovsk, and 1 in Rostov. The real population is believed to be much higher, as hundreds of Ainu in Sakhalin refused to identify themselves as such. Additionally many local people are ethnically Ainu or have significant Ainu ancestry, but identify as various recognised groups, such as Nivkhs and speak Russian as mother tongue, often not knowing about their Ainu ancestry.

== Present populations ==
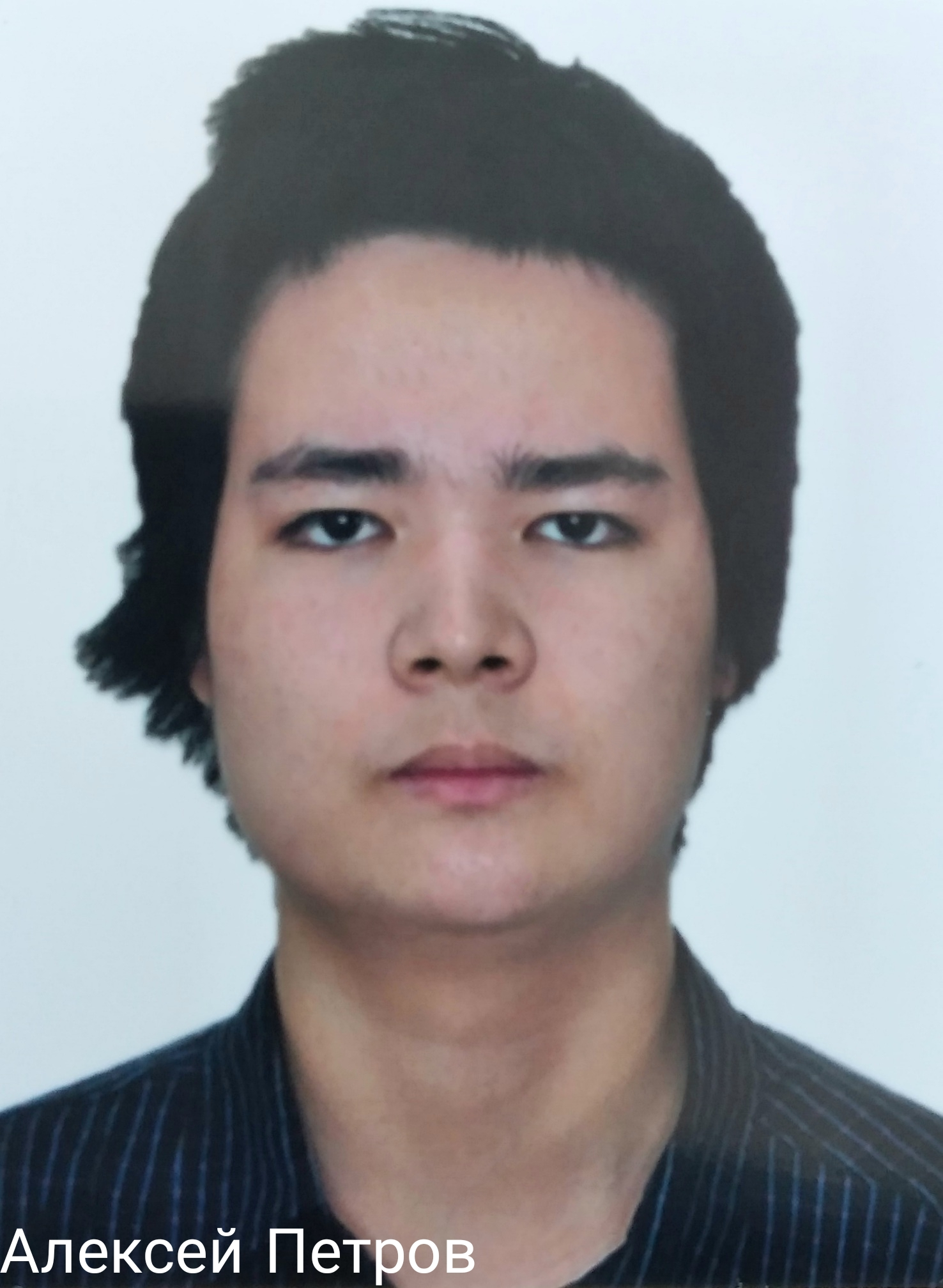
Alexei Petrov, an Ainu rights activist from Sakhalin.

=== Ainu of Ust-Bolsheretsky ===
Out of a total of 826 people living in the village of Zaporozhye in Ust-Bolsheretsky District, more than 100 people reported on the 2010 Census that they were Ainu. They are former residents of the liquidated villages Yavin and Golygino. The number of people with Ainu ancestry is estimated to be many times this amount, but in general, there is reluctance from the individuals themselves and from the census takers to record the nationality as "Ainu" (although not on a scale which is seen in Sakhalin). The majority of the population in Zaporozhye refers themselves as either Kamchadal (a term used for the natives of Kamchatka to refer to them without acknowledging their ethnic Ainu or Itelmen identity) or Russian, rather than identifying with either of the two native ethnic groups (Ainu and Itelmen). Although identifying as Itelmen can give additional benefits (hunting and fishing rights), the residents seems to be wary about ethnic polarisation and response from full-blooded Russian neighbors. Identifying as Ainu is not beneficial in any way. As an unrecognised nation, the Ainu are not eligible for either fishing or hunting quotas.

Families who are the descended from Kuril Ainu include Butin (Бутины), Storozhev (Сторожевы), Ignatiev (Игнатьевы), Merlin (Мерлины), Konev (Коневы), Lukaszewski (Лукашевские), and Novograblenny (Новограбленные) among other unknown ones.

=== Nakamura family ===
Akira (Alexei) Nakamura (b. 1897) was descended from the Northern Kuril Ainu, Southern Kuril Ainu, and the Kamchatka Ainu. In the early 18th century, Nakamura's ancestors emigrated to Kurile Lake in Kamchatka from Kunashir in the early 18th century, after a failed rebellion against Japan. Kurile Lake, was inhabited by the Kamchatka Ainu and North Kuril Ainu. In 1929, the Ainu of Kurile Lake fled to the island of Paramushir after an armed conflict with the Soviet authorities. At that time, Paramushir was under Japanese rule. During the Invasion of the Kuril Islands, Nakamura was captured by the Soviet army and his eldest son Takeshi Nakamura (1925–1945) was killed in the battle. Nakamura's only surviving son, Vladimir Alexeyevich Nakamura (b. 1927) was taken prisoner and joined the Soviet Army after his capture. After the war, Vladimir moved to Korsakov in Sakhalin to work in the harbour. In 1963, he married Tamara Timofeevna Pykhteeva, a member of the Sakhalin Ainu, who was also of Gilyak ancestry. Their only child, Alexei was born in 1964. Vladimir was later arrested in 1967 and sentenced to 15 years of hard labour in Tomari. At this time Tamara and Alexei moved to Manila in Kamchatka Krai. When Vladimir was released in 1982 he was deported to Japan by Soviet authorities.

=== Ainu of Commander Islands ===
In 1877, the Badaev (Бадаев) family split from the rest of Northern Kuril Ainu and decided to settle in the Commander Islands, along with the Aleut. They were assimilated by the Aleut and currently identify themselves as Aleut. Two of the families residing there are believed to be of partial Ainu ancestry: the Badaevs and the Kuznetsovs.

As of 2016, one individual was recorded as Ainu in the Aleutsky District.

== Federal recognition ==
According to the Census authority of Russian Federation, the Ainu are extinct as an ethnic group in Russia. Those who identify as Ainu, neither speak the Ainu language, nor practice any aspect of the traditional Ainu culture. In social behavior and customs, they are almost identical with the Old Russian settlers of Kamchatka and therefore the benefits which are given to the Itelmen cannot be given to the Ainu of Kamchatka.

The Ainu language is extinct as a spoken language in Russia. The Bolsheretsky Ainu stopped using the language as early as the beginning of the 20th century. Only 3 fluent speakers remained in Sakhalin as of 1979, and the language was extinct by the 1980s there. Although Vladimir Nakamura was a fluent speaker of Kuril Ainu and translated several documents from the language to Russian for the NKVD, he did not pass on the language to his son. Take Asai, the last speaker of Sakhalin Ainu, died in Japan in 1994.

== See also ==
- Ainu flag
