= Ainu language =

Language of Hokkaido, Japan

Hokkaido Ainu
- アイヌ イタㇰ / aynu itak / lајну lитак
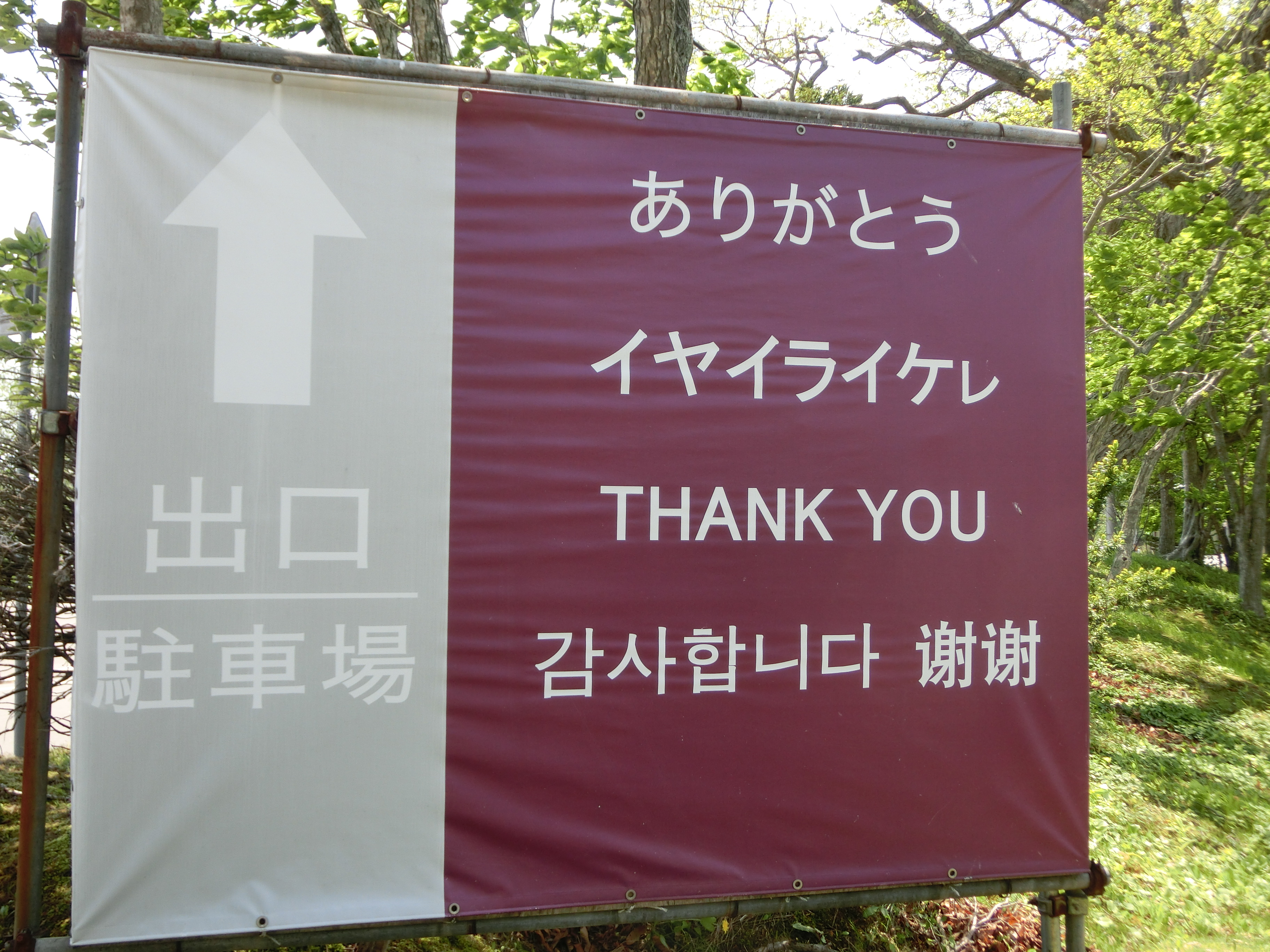
- Multilingual sign in Japanese, Ainu, English, Korean, and Chinese. The Ainu text, in katakana, is second down from the top and reads イヤイライケㇾ (iyairaiker).
- Pronunciation: [ʔájnu̜ ʔiták̚]
- Native to: Japan
- Region: Hokkaido
- Ethnicity: 25,000 (1986) to c. 200,000 (no date) Ainu people
- Native speakers: L1: "few" semispeakers (2022) "growing number of neo-speakers" (2022)
- Language family: Ainu: Hokkaido Ainu
- Dialects: Ishikari Ainu †; Menasunkur Ainu †; Sumunkur Ainu; Uchiura Ainu †
- Writing system: Katakana (current); Latin (current); Cyrillic (current)

Language codes
- ISO 639-2: ain
- ISO 639-3: ain
- Glottolog: ainu1240
- ELP: Ainu (Japan)

Ainu, (Note: アイヌ イタㇰ, aynu itak, pronounced [ʔájnu̜ ʔiták̚]) also known as Hokkaido Ainu (Japanese: 北海道アイヌ語), is a language native to the Ainu people of the northern Japanese island of Hokkaido. It is a member of the Ainu language family, considered to be an independent language family with no academic consensus regarding its origin. Until the 20th century, the three Ainu languages – Hokkaido Ainu, Kuril Ainu, and Sakhalin Ainu – were spoken throughout Hokkaido, the southern half of the island of Sakhalin and by small communities in the Kuril Islands, up to the southern tip of Kamchatka.

Following the colonization of Hokkaido, the number of Hokkaido Ainu speakers declined steadily throughout the 20th century, eventually becoming critically endangered. By 2008, only two native speakers of Ainu remained, both elderly. By 2017, Ainu was reportedly dormant. Hokkaido Ainu is now a heritage language with some native semi-speakers.

The term Ainu comes from the endonym of the Ainu people, aynu (アイヌ), meaning 'person' or 'human'.

== Speakers ==
An Ainu speaker, recorded in Japan in 2016

Although there are estimated to be at least 30,000 Ainu people in Japan, there is a low rate of self-identification as Ainu among people with Ainu ethnic roots. The Ainu language was already endangered by the 1960s and has continued to decline since. In 2011, a total of 304 people within Japan were reported to understand the Ainu language to some extent.

In 2017, linguistics researcher Thomas Dougherty stated that "Ainu is a dormant language isolate previously spoken on the northernmost Japanese island of Hokkaidō," and on his website he repeats that the language is "dormant".

In 2019, it was reported that "there remain only a few speakers in Hokkaido, who learned vocabularies from their parents or grandparents and who can use simple sentences in Ainu."

In 2022, in the Handbook of the Ainu Language, it was said that Ainu "is more or less extinct, or 'dormant', as a living medium [but] has still a few native semi-speakers, as well as a growing number of neo-speakers" (who include some non-Ainu) but no generational transmission of the language.

The Endangered Languages Project (citing a personal communication from Alexander Vovin) reports two native speakers with 80% certainty.

=== Vitality ===
In 2017, 671 people aged 15 or above from 291 randomly selected households participated in a Hokkaido government survey on the lives of Ainu people. Participants were believed to be descendants of Ainu people or those who joined Ainu families by marriage or adoption. In response to survey questions about fluency in the Ainu language, 0.7% of participants answered that they "would be able to have a conversation" in Ainu, 3.4% answered that they "would be able to converse a little", 44.6% answered that they "couldn't speak but had some knowledge about Ainu language", and 48.1% answered that they "couldn't speak at all".

In a subsequent survey of 472 respondents in 2023, 0.8% of respondents answered that they "would be able to have a conversation" in Ainu, 8.9% answered that they "would be able to converse a little", 19.3% answered that they "could barely converse at all", and 69.3% answered that they "would not be able to converse at all".

Ainu language usage amongst Ainu people in Hokkaido, surveys 1993–2023
Ainu language level	1993	1999	2006	2013	2017	2023
Can hold a conversation (%)	0.8	0.8	0.7	0.9	0.7	0.8
Can speak a little (%)	5.4	4.5	3.9	6.3	3.4	8.9
Cannot speak but have some knowledge (%)	37.1	38.3	32.4	44.2	44.6	–
Neither speak nor understand (%)	54.8	51.6	61.2	46.2	48.1	–
Unknown (%)	1.9	4.8	1.7	2.4	3.1	1.7
Sample size (# of Respondents)	642	715	712	586	671	472

== Recent history ==
Many of the speakers of Ainu lost the language with the advent of Japanese colonization, which formally began with the establishment of the Hokkaido Colonization Office in 1869. Japanese officials viewed the assimilation of Ainu a critical component of the Hokkaido colonization project, and developed policies designed to discourage or eliminate the use of the Ainu language, cultural practices, and traditional lifeways. The assimilation included the exploitation of Ainu land, the commodification of their culture, and the placing of Ainu children in schools where they learned only Japanese.

More recently, the Japanese government has acknowledged the Ainu people as an indigenous population. As of 1997 they were given indigenous rights under the United Nations Declaration on the Rights of Indigenous Peoples (UNDRIP) to their culture, heritage, and language.

The Ainu Cultural Promotion Act in 1997 appointed the Foundation for Research and Promotion of Ainu Culture (FRPAC). This foundation is tasked with language education, where they promote Ainu language learning through training instructors, advanced language classes and creation and development of language materials.

== Revitalization ==
In general, Ainu people are hard to find because they tend to hide their identity as Ainu, especially in the young generation. Two-thirds of Ainu youth do not know that they are Ainu. In addition, because Ainu students were strongly discouraged from speaking their language at school, it has been challenging for the Ainu language to be revitalized.

Despite this, there is an active movement to revitalize the language, mainly in Hokkaido but also elsewhere such as Kanto. Ainu oral literature has been documented both in hopes of safeguarding it for future generations, as well as using it as a teaching tool for language learners. Beginning in 1987, the Ainu Association of Hokkaido, with approximately 500 members, began hosting 14 Ainu language classes, Ainu language instructors training courses and Family Ainu Learning Initiative and have released instructional materials on the language, including a textbook. Also, Yamato linguists teach Ainu and train students to become Ainu instructors in university. In spite of these efforts, as of 2011 the Ainu language was not yet taught as a subject in any secondary school in Japan.

Due to the Ainu Cultural Promotion Act of 1997, Ainu dictionaries transformed and became tools for improving communication and preserving records of the Ainu language in order to revitalize the language and promote the culture. This act had aims to promote, disseminate, and advocate on behalf of Ainu cultural traditions. The main issue with this act however, was that not a single Ainu person was included in the "Expert" meetings prior to the law's passage, and as a result of this there was no mention of language education and how it should be carried out. The focus at this point was on Ainu culture revitalization rather than Ainu language revitalization.

As of 2011, there has been an increasing number of second-language learners, especially in Hokkaido, in large part due to the pioneering efforts of the late Ainu folklorist, activist and former Diet member Shigeru Kayano, himself a native speaker, who first opened an Ainu language school in 1987 funded by Ainu Kyokai. The Ainu Association of Hokkaido is the main supporter of Ainu culture in Hokkaido. Ainu language classes have been conducted in some areas in Japan and small numbers of young people are learning Ainu. Efforts have also been made to produce web-accessible materials for conversational Ainu because most documentation of the Ainu language focused on the recording of folktales. The Ainu language has been in media as well; the first Ainu radio program was called FM Pipaushi, which has run since 2001 along with 15-minute radio Ainu language lessons funded by FRPAC, and newspaper The Ainu Times has been established since 1997. In 2016, a radio course was broadcast by the STVradio Broadcasting to introduce Ainu language. The course put extensive efforts in promoting the language, creating four textbooks in each season throughout the year.

In addition, the Ainu language has been seen in public domains such as the outlet shopping complex's name, Rera, which means 'wind', in the Minami Chitose area and the name Pewre, meaning 'young', at a shopping centre in the Chitose area. There is also a basketball team in Sapporo founded under the name Rera Kamuy Hokkaido, after rera kamuy 'god of the wind' (its current name is Levanga Hokkaido). The well-known Japanese fashion magazine's name Non-no means 'flower' in Ainu.

Another Ainu language revitalization program is Urespa, a university program to educate high-level persons on the language of the Ainu. The effort is a collaborative and cooperative program for individuals wishing to learn about Ainu languages. This includes performances which focus on the Ainu and their language, instead of using the dominant Japanese language.

Another form of Ainu language revitalization is an annual national competition, which is Ainu language-themed. People of many differing demographics are often encouraged to take part in the contest. Since 2017, the popularity of the contest has increased.

On 15 February 2019, Japan approved a bill to recognize the Ainu language for the first time and enacted the law on 19 April 2019.

Outside of Japan, there have also been efforts to revive the Ainu culture and language in other countries, including Australia and Russia.

In 2019, researchers working together from both the Society for Academic Research of Ainu (SARC), representatives from Hokkaido University, and with the assistance of linguists spanning multiple universities and countries assisted in the creation of AI Pirika, an AI created with the goal of assisting with speech recognition and serving as a conversation partner.

== Official recognition ==
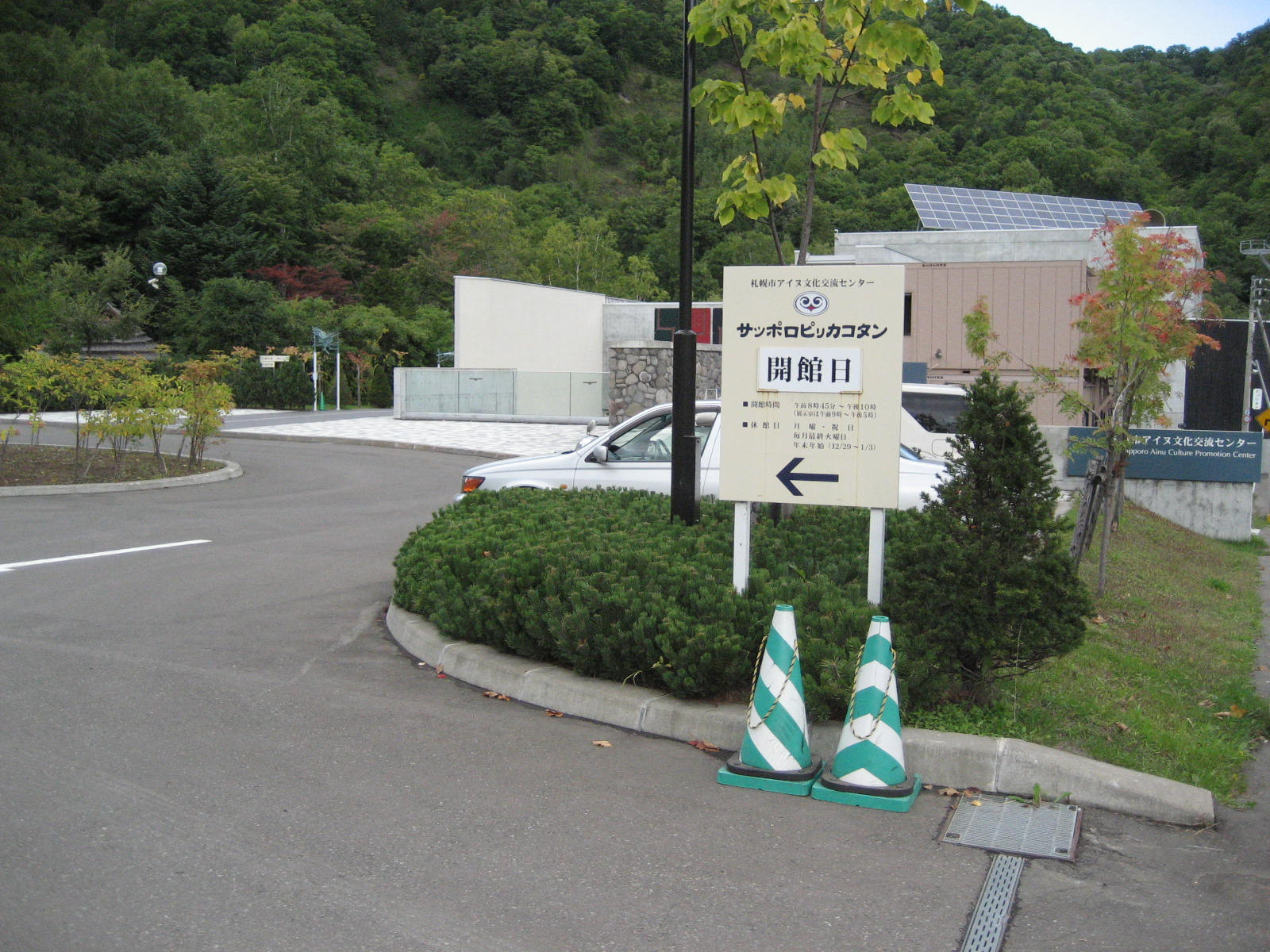
Pirka Kotan Museum, an Ainu language and cultural center in Sapporo (Jozankei area)

The Japanese government made a decision to recognize Ainu as an indigenous language in June 2008. The Japanese government approved and passed a bill officially recognising the Ainu as an indigenous people in 2019.

On 12 July 2020, the Japanese government opened the National Ainu Museum in Shiraoi, Hokkaido. It forms one of three institutions named Upopoy (lit. 'singing in a large group' in Ainu), alongside the National Ainu Park and a memorial site on high ground on the east side of Lake Poroto (ポロト湖) where Ainu services are held. Its director, Masahiro Nomoto, says that "One of our main objectives is to preserve and revive the language, as this is one of the most threatened elements of Ainu culture".

Announcements on some bus routes in Hokkaido can since be heard in Ainu, efforts are being undertaken to archive Ainu speech recordings by the Agency for Cultural Affairs, and there is a popular educational YouTube channel which teaches conversational Ainu.

While these measures have been praised for taking steps to protect the Ainu language and culture, the museum and related government efforts have been criticised for failing to acknowledge the history of Japanese discrimination against the Ainu people, and for the government's refusal to apologise for past misdeeds against the Ainu.

== Phonology ==
Ainu syllables are (C)V(C); (Note: Consonant – Vowel – Consonant, where components in parentheses are optional (e.g., can be absent). For a detailed explanation see the example at the end of Syllable § Grouping of components.) they have an obligatory vowel, and an optional syllable onset and coda consisting of one consonant. There are few consonant clusters.

=== Vowels ===
There are five vowels in Ainu:

	Front	Central	Back
Close	i		u
Mid	e		o
Open		a	

=== Consonants ===
	Bilabial	Alveolar	Palatal	Velar	Glottal
Nasal	m	n		(ŋ)	
Plosive	p	t		k	(ʔ)
Affricate		t͡s	(t͡ʃ)		
Fricative	(ɸ)	s	(ʃ) (ç)	(x)	h
Liquid		ɾ	j	w	

- The occlusives /p t ts~tʃ k/ may be voiced [b d dz~dʒ ɡ] between vowels and after nasals.
- /t͡s/ can be heard as [t͡ʃ] in free variation. Both /ti/ and /tsi/ are realized as [t͡ʃi], and /s/ becomes [ʃ] before /i/ and at the end of syllables.
- /h/ is heard as [ɸ] before /u/ and [ç] before /i/.
- /n/ is heard as [ŋ] before /k/, as well as in final position.
- An epenthetic glottal stop [ʔ] is often inserted word-initially before an accented vowel.
- /x/ existed in Sakhalin Ainu only. It was derived from lenition and merger of coda /p, t, k, ɾ/.

The Ainu language also has a pitch accent system. Generally, words containing affixes have a high pitch on a syllable in the stem. This will typically fall on the first syllable if that is long (has a final consonant or a diphthong), and will otherwise fall on the second syllable, though there are exceptions to this generalization.

== Grammar ==
Typologically, Ainu is similar in word order (and some aspects of phonology) to Japanese.

Ainu has a canonical word order of subject, object, verb, and uses postpositions rather than prepositions. Nouns can cluster to modify one another; the head comes at the end. Verbs, which are inherently either transitive or intransitive, accept various derivational affixes. Ainu does not have grammatical gender. Plurals are indicated by a suffix.

Classical Ainu, the language of the yukar, is polysynthetic, with incorporation of nouns and adverbs; this is greatly reduced in the modern colloquial language.

Applicatives may be used in Ainu to place nouns in dative, instrumental, comitative, locative, allative, or ablative roles. Besides freestanding nouns, these roles may be assigned to incorporated nouns, and such use of applicatives is in fact mandatory for incorporating oblique nouns. Like incorporation, applicatives have grown less common in the modern language.

Ainu has a closed class of plural verbs, and some of these are suppletive.

Ainu has a system of verbal affixes (shown below) which mark agreement for person and case. The specific cases that are marked differ by person, with nominative–accusative marking for the first person singular, tripartite marking for the first person plural and indefinite (or 'fourth') person, and direct or 'neutral' marking for the second singular and plural, and third persons (i.e. the affixes do not differ by case).

Saru Ainu agreement affixes
		Subject		Object
		Intransitive	Transitive (Agent)	Object
1st person	singular	ku- ク-		en- エン-
1st person	plural	-as -アㇱ	ci- チ-	un- ウン-
2nd person	singular	e- エ-		
2nd person	plural	eci- エチ-		
3rd person		Ø-		
4th person		-an -アン	a- ア-	i- イ

クイタㇰ。
Ku-itak.
1SG-speak
'I spoke.'

エイタㇰ。
E-itak.
2SG-speak
You (SG) spoke.'

イタㇰ。
Itak.
speak
'He spoke.'

=== Sentence types ===
==== Intransitive sentences ====
クアニ クイタㇰ。
Kuani ku-itak.
I 1SG-speak
'I spoke.'

アイヌ エㇰ。
Aynu ek.
person come
'A person came.'

ポン トゥレシ カ イサㇺ。
Pon turesi ka isam.
small sister too die
'The small sister too died.'

==== Transitive and ditransitive sentences ====
アエコイキ。
A-e-koyki.
1SG-2SG-kill
'I kill you.'

金田一 殿 ニㇱパ クヌカㇻ。
Kindaichi tono nispa ku-nukar.
Kindaichi chief sir 1SG-see
'I met Mr. Kindaichi.'

カムイ ウンマ ライケ。
Kamuy umma rayke.
bear horse kill
'A bear killed a horse.'

メノコ ヘカチ イチェン コレ。
menoko hekaci icen kore.
woman boy money give
“The woman gave the boy money.”

== Writing system ==
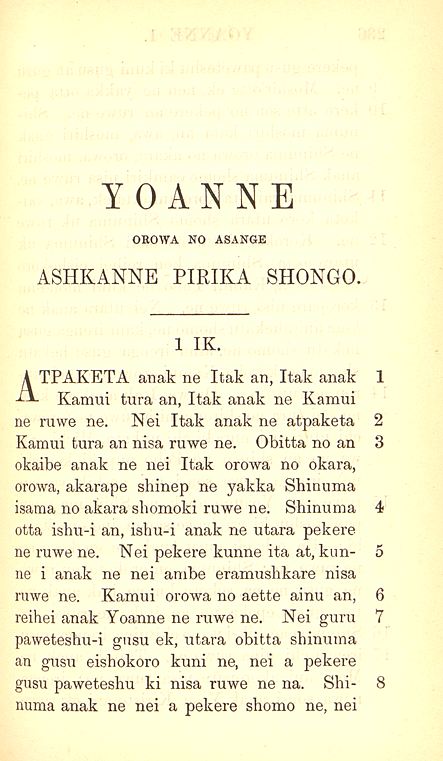
Gospel of John in Latin-script Ainu

The Ainu language is written in a modified version of the Japanese katakana syllabary, although it is possible for Japanese loan words and names to be written in kanji (for example, "mobile phone" can be written ケイタイデンワ or 携帯電話). There is also a Latin-based alphabet in use. The Ainu Times publishes in both. In the Latin orthography, /ts/ is spelled c and /j/ is spelled y; the glottal stop, [ʔ], which only occurs initially before accented vowels, is not written. Other phonemes use the same character as the IPA transcription given above. An equals sign (=) is used to mark morpheme boundaries, such as after a prefix. Its pitch accent is denoted by acute accent in Latin script (e.g., á). This is usually not denoted in katakana.

John Batchelor was an English missionary who lived among the Ainu, studied them and published many works on the Ainu language. Batchelor wrote extensively, both works about the Ainu language and works in Ainu itself. He was the first to write in Ainu and use a writing system for it. Batchelor's translations of various books of the Bible were published from 1887, and his New Testament translation was published in Yokohama in 1897 by a joint committee of the British and Foreign Bible Society, the American Bible Society, and the National Bible Society of Scotland. Other books written in Ainu include dictionaries, a grammar, and books on Ainu culture and language.

=== Special katakana for the Ainu language ===
A Unicode standard exists for a set of extended katakana (Katakana Phonetic Extensions) for transliterating the Ainu language and other languages written with katakana. These characters are used to write final consonants and sounds that cannot be expressed using conventional katakana. The extended katakana are based on regular katakana and either are smaller in size or have a handakuten. As few fonts yet support these extensions, workarounds exist for many of the characters, such as using a smaller font with the regular katakana ク ku to produce ク to represent the separate small katakana glyph ㇰ ku used as in アイヌイタㇰ (Ainu itak).

This is a list of special katakana used in transcribing the Ainu language. Most of the characters are of the extended set of katakana, though a few have been used historically in Japanese, and thus are part of the main set of katakana. A number of previously proposed characters have not been added to Unicode as they can be represented as a sequence of two existing codepoints.

Character	Unicode	Name	Ainu usage	Pronunciation
ㇰ	31F0	Katakana Letter Small Ku	Final k	/k/
ㇱ	31F1	Katakana Letter Small Shi	Final s [ɕ]	/s/ or /ɕ/
ㇲ	31F2	Katakana Letter Small Su	Final s, used to emphasize its pronunciation as [s] rather than [ɕ]. [s] and [ʃ] are allophones in Ainu.	/s/
ㇳ	31F3	Katakana Letter Small To	Final t	/t/
ㇴ	31F4	Katakana Letter Small Nu	Final n	/n/
ㇵ	31F5	Katakana Letter Small Ha	Final h [x], succeeding the vowel a. (e.g. アㇵ ah) Sakhalin Ainu only.	/h/ or /x/
ㇶ	31F6	Katakana Letter Small Hi	Final h [ç], succeeding the vowel i. (e.g. イㇶ ih) Sakhalin Ainu only.	/h/ or /ç/
ㇷ	31F7	Katakana Letter Small Fu	Final h [x], succeeding the vowel u. (e.g. ウㇷ uh) Sakhalin Ainu only.	/h/ or /x/
ㇸ	31F8	Katakana Letter Small He	Final h [x], succeeding the vowel e. (e.g. エㇸ eh) Sakhalin Ainu only.	/h/ or /x/
ㇹ	31F9	Katakana Letter Small Ho	Final h [x], succeeding the vowel o. (e.g. オㇹ oh) Sakhalin Ainu only.	/h/ or /x/
ㇺ	31FA	Katakana Letter Small Mu	Final m	/m/ Voiced bilabial nasal
ㇻ	31FB	Katakana Letter Small Ra	Final r [ɾ], succeeding the vowel a. (e.g. アㇻ ar)	/ɾ/ Voiced alveolar tap
ㇼ	31FC	Katakana Letter Small Ri	Final r [ɾ], succeeding the vowel i. (e.g. イㇼ ir)	/ɾ/ Voiced alveolar tap
ㇽ	31FD	Katakana Letter Small Ru	Final r [ɾ], succeeding the vowel u. (e.g. ウㇽ ur)	/ɾ/ Voiced alveolar tap
ㇾ	31FE	Katakana Letter Small Re	Final r [ɾ], succeeding the vowel e. (e.g. エㇾ er)	/ɾ/ Voiced alveolar tap
ㇿ	31FF	Katakana Letter Small Ro	Final r [ɾ], succeeding the vowel o. (e.g. オㇿ or)	/ɾ/ Voiced alveolar tap
Characters represented using combining characters
ㇷ゚	31F7 + 309A	Katakana Letter Small Pu	Final p	/p/
セ゚	30BB + 309A	Katakana Letter Se With Semi-Voiced Sound Mark	ce [tse]	/ts/ + /e/
ツ゚	30C4 + 309A	Katakana Letter Tu With Semi-Voiced Sound Mark	tu. ツ゚ and ト゚ are interchangeable.	/t/ + /u/
ト゚	30C8 + 309A	Katakana Letter To With Semi-Voiced Sound Mark	tu. ツ゚ and ト゚ are interchangeable.	/t/ + /u/

=== Basic syllables ===
	a [a]	i [i]	u [u̜]	e [e]	o [o]
	a ア [a]	i イ [i]	u ウ [u̜]	e エ [e]	o オ [o]
k [k] (Note: k, t, c, p are sometimes voiced [ɡ], [d], [dz~dʒ], [b], respectively. It does not change the meaning of a word, but it sounds more rough/masculine. When they are voiced, they may be written as g, d, j, dz, b, ガ, ダ, ヂャ, ヅァ, バ, etc.)	ka カ [ka]	ki キ [ki]	ku ク [ku̜]	ke ケ [ke]	ko コ [ko]
k [k]	-k ㇰ [-k̚]				
s [s] ~ [ʃ]	sa サ / シャ (Note: Either may be used according to actual pronunciations, or to writer's preferred styles.) [sa] ~ [ʃa]	si シ [ʃi]	su ス / シュ [su̜] ~ [ʃu̜]	se セ / シェ [se] ~ [ʃe]	so ソ / ショ [so] ~ [ʃo]
s [s] ~ [ʃ]	-s ㇱ / ㇲ [-ɕ]				
t [t]	ta タ [ta]	ci チ [tʃi]	tu トゥ / ト゚ / ツ゚ [tu̜]	te テ [te]	to ト [to]
t [t]	-t ッ / ㇳ (Note: ッ is final t at the end of a word (e.g. pet = ペッ = ペㇳ). ッ also means the following consonant is geminated (e.g. wakka = ワッカ).) [-t̚]				
c [tʃ] ~ [ts]	ca チャ [tʃa] ~ [tsa]	ci チ [tʃi]	cu チュ / ツ [tʃu̜] ~ [tsu̜]	ce チェ / セ゚ [tʃe] ~ [tse]	co チョ [tʃo] ~ [tso]
n [n]	na ナ [na]	ni ニ [nʲi]	nu ヌ [nu̜]	ne ネ [ne]	no ノ [no]
n [n]	-n ン / ㇴ (Note: At the end of a word, n can be written either ㇴ or ン. In the middle of a polysyllabic word, it is ン. (e.g. tan-mosir = タンモシㇼ = タㇴ+モシㇼ, but not タㇴモシㇼ.)) [-n, -m-, -ŋ-] (Note: [m] before [p] or [m], [ŋ] before [k], [n] elsewhere. Unlike Japanese, it does not become other sounds such as nasal vowels.)				
h (Note: Initial h [h] and final h [x] are different phonemes. Final h exists in Sakhalin Ainu only.) [h]	ha ハ [ha]	hi ヒ [çi]	hu フ [ɸu̜]	he ヘ [he]	ho ホ [ho]
-h [-x]	-ah ㇵ [-ax]	-ih ㇶ [-iç]	-uh ㇷ [-u̜x]	-eh ㇸ [-ex]	-oh ㇹ [-ox]
p [p]	pa パ [pa]	pi ピ [pi]	pu プ [pu̜]	pe ペ [pe]	po ポ [po]
p [p]	-p ㇷ゚ [-p̚]				
m [m]	ma マ [ma]	mi ミ [mi]	mu ム [mu̜]	me メ [me]	mo モ [mo]
m [m]	-m ㇺ (Note: When preceding [p] or [m], this is written ン.) [-m]				
y [j]	ya ヤ [ja]		yu ユ [ju̜]	ye イェ [je]	yo ヨ [jo]
r [ɾ]	ra ラ [ɾa]	ri リ [ɾi]	ru ル [ɾu̜]	re レ [ɾe]	ro ロ [ɾo]
r [ɾ]	-ar ㇻ [-aɾ]	-ir ㇼ [-iɾ]	-ur ㇽ [-u̜ɾ]	-er ㇾ [-eɾ]	-or ㇿ [-oɾ]
r [ɾ]	-r ㇽ [-ɾ]				
w [w]	wa ワ [wa]	wi ウィ / ヰ [wi]		we ウェ / ヱ [we]	wo ウォ / ヲ [wo]

=== Diphthongs ===
Final [ɪ] is spelled y in Latin, ordinal イ in katakana. Final [ʊ] is spelled w in Latin, ordinal ウ in katakana.

Example with initial k:
[kaɪ]	[ku̜ɪ]	[keɪ]	[koɪ]	[kaʊ]	[kiʊ]	[keʊ]	[koʊ]
kay	kuy	key	koy	kaw	kiw	kew	kow
カイ	クイ	ケイ	コイ	カウ	キウ	ケウ	コウ
[ka.ɪ]	[ku̜.ɪ]	[ke.ɪ]	[ko.ɪ]	[ka.u̜]	[ki.u̜]	[ke.u̜]	[ko.u̜]
ka=i	ku=i	ke=i	ko=i	ka=u	ki=u	ke=u	ko=u
カイ	クイ	ケイ	コイ	カウ	キウ	ケウ	コウ

== Oral literature ==
The Ainu have a rich oral tradition of hero-sagas called yukar, which retain a number of grammatical and lexical archaisms. Yukar were memorized and told at get-togethers and ceremonies that often lasted hours or even days. The Ainu also have another form of narrative often used called Uepeker, which was used in the same contexts.

A native written form of the Ainu language has never existed; therefore, the Ainu people traditionally relied on memorization and oral communication to pass down their literature to the next generation. Ainu literature includes nonfiction, such as their history and "hunting adventures", and fiction such as stories about spiritual avatars, magic, myths, and heroes.

=== Research on oral literature ===
Audio recording of an Ainu song by Bronisław Piłsudski
An audio recording of an Ainu song by Bronisław Piłsudski

The oral literature of the Ainu languages has been studied mainly by Japanese and European researchers; thus, Ainu literature has been transcribed using writing systems such as Japanese katakana (commonly used for foreign-language text) and the Latin alphabet, and documented in the languages of the researchers themselves. One prominent researcher of the Ainu languages is Bronisław Piłsudski, a Polish anthropologist who lived in Sakhalin from 1886 to 1905, and who published "Materials for the Study of the Ainu Language and Folklore" in 1912. In addition, Piłsudski made audio recordings from 1902 to 1903, which is believed to be the first attempt to do so in the history of Ainu oral literature study. Japanese linguist Kyosuke Kindaichi is also famous for his work on the oral literature of the Ainu languages, and for his publication Ainu monogatari: tsuketari Ainugo taii oyobi goi (あいぬ物語: 附・あいぬ語大意及語彙) in 1913.

== Sample text ==
Below is a sample text from a traditional Ainu folktale, in Ainu, Japanese and English.

Ainu original	Latin transliteration	Japanese translation	English translation
シネアン ト タ ぺテトㇰ ウン シノタㇱ クス パイェアㇱ アワ、ぺテトㇰタ シネ ポンルㇷ゚ネクㇽ ネスコ ウライ カㇻ クス ウライキㇰ ネアㇷ゚ コサニッケウカン プナㇱ・プナㇱ。	Sinean to ta petetok un sinotas kusu payeas awa, petetokta sine ponrupnekur nesko urai kar kusu uraikik neap kosanikkeukan punas-punas.	ある日に（川の）水源の方へ（私が）遊ぶに（私が）出かけたら（思いがけなく）（川の）水源に一人の小男が胡桃（くるみ）の木の梁（やな）をたてるため（胡桃の木の）杭を打っていた。 （それに下げた）腰を幾度も上げて立っている。(腰を曲げ曲げしている。)	One day, as I went out to play at the spring, there was a little man at the spring hitting stakes made of walnut wood, in order to erect (some) wooden beams. His hip bent (and he bent down) and he straightened out (as he worked, going up and down over and over).
