= Ainu languages =

Language family of northern Japan and neighboring islands

Ainu
- Ainuic
- Geographic distribution: Historically Hokkaido, southern and central Sakhalin, the Kuril Islands, and possibly northern Honshu
- Ethnicity: Ainu
- Extinct: 2010s (Hokkaido Ainu)
- Linguistic classification: One of the world's primary language families
- Subdivisions: Hokkaido Ainu; Kuril Ainu †; Sakhalin Ainu †; Emishi? †; Jōmon? †

Language codes
- ISO 639-2 / 5: ain
- ISO 639-3: ain
- Glottolog: ainu1252
- Map of the historical distribution of Ainu languages and dialects

The Ainu languages (/ˈaɪnuː/ EYE-noo), sometimes known as Ainuic, are a language family once spoken by the Ainu people of northern Japan, southern Sakhalin and the Kuril Islands.

The primary varieties of Ainu are alternately considered a group of closely related languages or divergent dialects of a single language isolate. Toponymic evidence suggests Ainu was once spoken in northern Honshu and that much of the historically attested extent of the family was due to a relatively recent expansion northward. No genealogical relationship between Ainu and any other language family has been demonstrated, despite numerous attempts.

Kuril Ainu was declared extinct in 1962 and Sakhalin Ainu in 1994. Hokkaidō Ainu was declared critically endangered in 2009.

== Varieties ==
The three dialect groups are Hokkaidō Ainu, Kuril Ainu, and Sakhalin Ainu. Kuril Ainu and Sakhalin Ainu are both classified as extinct. Hokkaidō Ainu has been declared critically endangered by UNESCO and the current number of speakers is unknown.

=== Hokkaidō Ainu ===
Hokkaidō Ainu is the group of dialects spoken by the Ainu people from modern-day Hokkaidō prefecture. It is subdivided into several smaller dialect groups with substantial differences between them: the 'neck' of the island (Oshima County, data from Oshamambe and Yakumo); the "classical" Ainu of central Hokkaidō around Sapporo and the southern coast (Iburi and Hidaka counties, data from Horobetsu, Biratori, Nukkibetsu and Niikappu; historical records from Ishikari County and Sapporo show that these were similar); Samani (on the southeastern cape in Hidaka, but perhaps closest to the northeastern dialect); the northeast (data from Obihiro, Kushiro and Bihoro); the north-central dialect (Kamikawa County, data from Asahikawa and Nayoro) and Sōya (on the northwestern cape), which was closest of all Hokkaidō varieties to Sakhalin Ainu.

Currently, Hokkaidō Ainu is the most commonly learned variety because it has the most materials like grammatical descriptions and records available to learn it. The Saru dialect is the most commonly learned by Ainu learners.

=== Kuril Ainu ===
Kuril Ainu was spoken by the Ainu people from the Kuril Islands. The dialect group is divided into Northern and Southern Kuril Ainu.

There are not many published documents that record information about the Kuril Ainu dialects. Torii Ryūzō collected data about the Kuril dialect. Other Ainu language researchers have used Torii's work and data to create dictionaries and analyze the Ainu dialects. There is currently only one known document of Southern Kuril. Previously unpublished documents on Kuril Ainu have been found in Russia. Researchers assume that more unpublished documents exist since some works reference unknown documents and previously unknown documents have been found in archives.

Kuril Ainu is extinct. The records of it contain mostly data about vocabulary and do not provide much information on grammar. Currently, people seeking to learn Kuril Ainu have to learn dialects from other regions.

=== Sakhalin Ainu ===
Sakhalin Ainu is the group of dialects spoken by the Ainu people from Sakhalin. The dialect group comprises several distinct dialects. The eastern coastal dialect of Taraika, near modern Gastello in Poronaysky District, was quite divergent from the other localities. The Raychishka dialect, on the western coast near modern Uglegorsk, is the best documented and has a dedicated grammatical description.

Tahkonanna, the last speaker of Sakhalin Ainu, died in 1994. While Sakhalin Ainu is extinct, people are using records to learn it in revival efforts.

The Sakhalin Ainu dialects had long vowels and a final -h phoneme, which was pronounced [x].

== Classification ==
Alexander Vovin classifies the Ainu dialects as follows:

- Proto-Ainu
  - Proto-Hokkaido–Kuril
    - Hokkaido dialects
    - Kuril dialects
  - Proto-Sakhalin
    - Sakhalin dialects

== Proto-language ==
The proto-language was reconstructed twice by Alexander Vovin.

Consonants (Vovin 1989)
	Labial	Dental/ Alveolar	Dorsal	Dorso-Glottal
Nasal	*m	*n		
Stop	*p	*t	*k	
Continuant	*w	*ð	*ɣ	*h
Sibilant		*s		
Rhotic		*r		

Consonants (Vovin 1993)
		Bilabial	Dental/ Alveolar	Dorsal	Glottal
Nasal		*m	*n		
Stop	voiceless	*p	*t	*k	(*q)
Stop	voiced		*d	*g	
Fricative	voiceless		*s		*h
Fricative	voiced	(*H)			
Sonorant			*ɾ	*j	

The second reconstruction shows the voiced stops except for [b] being distinct phonemes and uses ⟨*q⟩ for the glottal stop. He also tentatively proposes that there might have been a third fricative alongside *s and *h, which was voiced, its place of articulation unknown. He represents it with ⟨*H⟩.

Reconstructed Proto-Ainu numerals (1–10) and its reflexes in selected descendants are as follows:

Numerals
	Proto-Ainu (Note: The double hyphen indicates a conjectural morpheme boundary.)	Hokkaido Ainu	Sakhalin Ainu	Kuril Ainu
1	*sì=nÉ=	sinep	sinep	shinep
2	*tuu=	tup	tup	tup
3	*dE=	re	rep	nep
4	*íì=nÈ=	inep	inep	inep
5	*áskì	asiknep	asik	ashinep
6	*ii=hdan=	iwan	iwan	oshwamp
7	*a=d[E]=hdan=	arwan	arwam	arawamp
8	*tu=pE=hdan=	tupesanpe	tubis	tumisampe
9	*si=nE=pE=hdan=	sinepesanpe	sinspis	shinimesampe
10	*hdán=	wan	uupis	oampe

Eight front and back vowels are reconstructed; three more central vowels are uncertain.

Vowels
	Front		Central	Back
Close	*i	(*ü)	(*ï)	*u
Close-Mid	*e		(*ë)	*o
Open-Mid	*E			*O
Open	*a			*A

== Orthography ==
Ainu did not develop its own writing system. Ainu authors have used a modified katakana or Latin alphabet to write Ainu. An example of Ainu writing is the Ainu Times (アイヌタイムズ, Ainu Taimuzu), which is an Ainu-language newsletter written in both modified katakana and the Latin alphabet that is published four times a year by the Ainu Pen Club of Hokkaidō.

== External relationships ==
No genealogical relationship between Ainu and any other language family has been demonstrated, despite numerous attempts. Thus, it is a language isolate. Ainu is sometimes grouped with the Paleosiberian languages, but this is only a geographic blanket term for several unrelated language families that were present in easternmost Siberia before the advances of Turkic and Tungusic languages there.

A study by Lee and Hasegawa of Waseda University found evidence that the Ainu language and the early Ainu-speakers originated from the Northeast Asian/Okhotsk population, which established themselves in northern Hokkaido and expanded into large parts of Honshu and the Kurils.

The Ainu languages share a noteworthy amount of vocabulary (especially fish names) with several Northeast Asian languages, including Nivkh, Tungusic, Mongolic, and Chukotko-Kamchatkan. While linguistic evidence points to an origin of these words among the Ainu languages, its spread and how these words arrived into other languages is unknown.

The most frequent proposals for relatives of Ainu are given below:

=== Altaic ===
John C. Street (1962) proposed linking Ainu, Korean, and Japanese in one family and Turkic, Mongolic, and Tungusic in another, with the two families linked in a common "North Asiatic" family. Street's grouping was an extension of the Altaic hypothesis, which at the time linked Turkic, Mongolic, and Tungusic, sometimes adding Korean; today Altaic sometimes includes Korean and rarely Japanese but not Ainu (Georg et al. 1999).

From a perspective more centered on Ainu, James Patrie (1982) adopted the same grouping, namely Ainu–Korean–Japanese and Turkic–Mongolic–Tungusic, with these two families linked in a common family, as in Street's "North Asiatic".

Joseph Greenberg (2000–2002) likewise classified Ainu with Korean and Japanese. He regarded "Korean–Japanese-Ainu" as forming a branch of his proposed Eurasiatic language family. Greenberg did not hold Korean–Japanese–Ainu to have an especially close relationship with Turkic–Mongolic–Tungusic within this family.

The Altaic hypothesis is now rejected by the scholarly mainstream.

=== Austroasiatic ===
Shafer (1965) presented evidence suggesting a distant connection with the Austroasiatic languages, which include many of the indigenous languages of Southeast Asia. Vovin (1992) presented his reconstruction of Proto-Ainu with evidence, in the form of proposed sound changes and cognates, of a relationship with Austroasiatic. In 1993, Vovin still regarded this hypothesis as preliminary.

=== Language contact with the Nivkhs ===
The Ainu appear to have experienced intensive contact with the Nivkhs during the course of their history. It is not known to what extent this has affected the language. Linguists believe the vocabulary shared between Ainu and Nivkh (historically spoken in the northern half of Sakhalin and on the Asian mainland facing it) is due to borrowing.

=== Language contact with the Japanese ===
The Ainu came into extensive contact with the Japanese in the 14th century. Analytic grammatical constructions acquired or transformed in Ainu were probably due to contact with the Japanese language. A large number of Japanese loanwords were borrowed into Ainu and to a smaller extent vice versa. There are also a great number of loanwords from the Japanese language in various stages of its development to Hokkaidō Ainu, and a smaller number of loanwords from Ainu into Japanese, particularly animal names such as rakko (猟虎, 'sea otter'; Ainu rakko), tonakai (馴鹿, 'reindeer'; Ainu tunakkay), and shishamo (柳葉魚, a fish, Spirinchus lanceolatus; Ainu susam). Due to the low status of Ainu in Japan, many ancient loanwords may be ignored or undetected, but there is evidence of an older substrate, where older Japanese words which have no clear etymology appear related to Ainu words which do. An example is modern Japanese sake or shake (鮭), meaning 'salmon', probably from the Ainu sak ipe or shak embe for 'salmon', literally 'summer food'.

According to P. Elmer (2019), the Ainu languages are a contact language, i.e. have strong influences from various Japonic dialects/languages during different stages, suggesting early and intensive contact between them somewhere in the Tōhoku region, with Ainu borrowing a large amount of vocabulary and typological characteristics from early Japonic.

=== Other proposals ===
A small number of linguists suggested a relation between Ainu and Indo-European languages, based on racial theories regarding the origin of the Ainu people. The theory of an Indo-European—Ainu relation was popular until 1960; later linguists dismissed it and concentrated on more local language families.

Tambovtsev (2008) proposes that Ainu is typologically most similar to Native American languages and suggests that further research is needed to establish a genetic relationship between these languages.

== Geography ==
Until the 20th century, Ainu languages were spoken throughout the southern half of the island of Sakhalin and by small numbers of people in the Kuril Islands. Only the Hokkaido variant survives, with the last speaker of Sakhalin Ainu having died in 1994.

Some linguists note that the Ainu language was an important lingua franca on Sakhalin. Asahi (2005) reported that the status of the Ainu language was rather high and was also used by early Russian and Japanese administrative officials to communicate with each other and with the indigenous people.

=== Ainu on mainland Japan ===
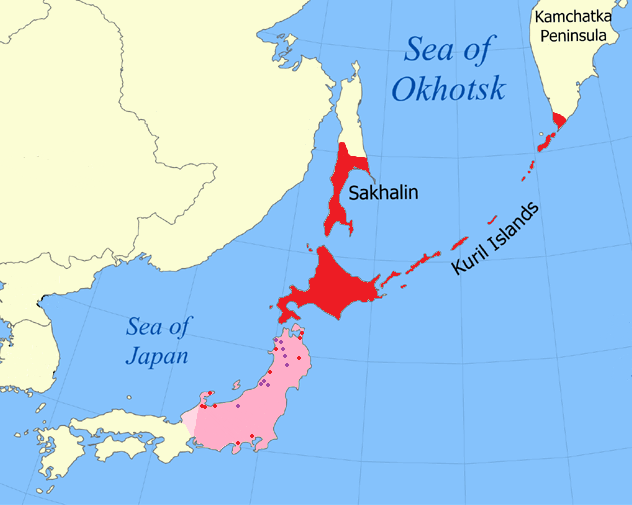
Attested historical extent of Ainu (red) and suspected earlier extent on Honshu (pink). The latter is based on toponymic evidence (red dots) and Matagi villages (purple dots). The western limit is defined by the early eastern limit of the Japanese language, as preserved in modern Japanese isoglosses.

It is occasionally suggested that Ainu was the language of the indigenous Emishi people of the northern part of the main Japanese island of Honshu. (Note: Ainu may also have been the language of one of the peoples known as 'Emishi'; it is not known that the Emishi were a single ethnicity.) The main evidence for this is the presence of place names that appear to be of Ainu origin in both locations. For example, the -betsu common to many northern Japanese place names is known to derive from the Ainu word 'pet' ("river") in Hokkaidō, and the same is suspected of similar names ending in -be in northern Honshū and Chūbu, such as the Kurobe and Oyabe rivers in Toyama Prefecture. Other place names in Kantō and Chūbu, such as Mount Ashigara (Kanagawa–Shizuoka), Musashi (modern Tokyo), Keta Shrine (Toyama), and the Noto Peninsula, have no explanation in Japanese, but do in Ainu. The traditional matagi hunters of the mountain forests of Tōhoku retain Ainu words in their hunting vocabulary (see Matagi dialect). However, Elmer (2019) has also suggested Japonic etymologies, which supposedly got borrowed into early Ainu and lost in contemporary Japonic dialects.

The direction of influence and migration is debated. It has been proposed that at least some Jōmon period groups spoke a proto-Ainu language, and that they displaced the Okhotsk culture north from southern Hokkaido when the Ainu fled Japanese expansion into northern Honshu, with the Okhotsk ancestral to the modern Nivkh as well as a component of the modern Ainu. However, it has also been proposed that the Ainu themselves can be identified with the Okhotsk culture, and that they expanded south into northern Honshu as well as to the Kamchatka Peninsula, or that the Emishi spoke a Japonic language, most closely related to ancient Izumo dialect, rather than anything related to Ainu, with Ainu-speakers migrating later from Hokkaido to northern Tōhoku. The purported evidence for this are old-Japanese loanwords in the Ainu language, including basic vocabulary, as well as distinctive Japonic terms and toponyms found in Tōhoku and Hokkaido, that have been linked to the Izumo dialect.

== Bibliography ==
- Bugaeva, Anna (2010). "Internet applications for endangered languages: A talking dictionary of Ainu". Waseda Institute for Advanced Study Research Bulletin. 3: 73–81.
- Hattori, Shirō, ed. (1964). Bunrui Ainugo hōgen jiten [An Ainu dialect dictionary with Ainu, Japanese, and English indexes]. Tokyo: Iwanami Shoten.
- Miller, Roy Andrew (1967). The Japanese Language. Tokyo: Charles E. Tuttle.
- Murasaki, Kyōko (1977). Karafuto Ainugo: Sakhalin Rayciska Ainu Dialect—Texts and Glossary. Tokyo: Kokushokankōkai.
- Murasaki, Kyōko (1978). Karafuto Ainugo: Sakhalin Rayciska Ainu Dialect—Grammar. Tokyo: Kokushokankōkai.
- Piłsudski, Bronisław (1998). Majewicz, Alfred F. (ed.). The Aborigines of Sakhalin. The Collected Works of Bronisław Piłsudski. Vol. I. Berlin-New York: Walter de Gruyter. p. 792. ISBN 978-3-11-010928-3.
- Refsing, Kirsten (1986). The Ainu Language: The Morphology and Syntax of the Shizunai Dialect. Aarhus: Aarhus University Press. ISBN 87-7288-020-1.
- Refsing, Kirsten (1996). Early European Writings on the Ainu Language. London: Routledge. ISBN 978-0-7007-0400-2.
- Shibatani, Masayoshi (1990). The Languages of Japan. Cambridge: Cambridge University Press. ISBN 0-521-36918-5.
- Tamura, Suzuko (2000). The Ainu Language. Tokyo: Sanseido. ISBN 4-385-35976-8.
- Vovin, Alexander (2008). "Man'yōshū to Fudoki ni Mirareru Fushigina Kotoba to Jōdai Nihon Retto ni Okeru Ainugo no Bunpu" [Strange Words in the Man'yoshū and the Fudoki and the Distribution of the Ainu Language in the Japanese Islands in Prehistory] (PDF). Kokusai Nihon Bunka Kenkyū Sentā. Archived from the original (PDF) on 11 February 2014.
- Vovin, Alexander (1992). "The origins of the Ainu language" (PDF). The Third International Symposium on Language and Linguistics: 672–686.
- Vovin, Alexander (1993). A Reconstruction of Proto-Ainu. Leiden: Brill. ISBN 978-90-04-09905-0.

Proposed classifications

- Bengtson, John D. (2006). "A Multilateral Look at Greater Austric". Mother Tongue. 11: 219–258.
- Georg, Stefan; Michalove, Peter A.; Ramer, Alexis Manaster; Sidwell, Paul J. (1999). "Telling general linguists about Altaic". Journal of Linguistics. 35 (1): 65–98. doi:10.1017/s0022226798007312. S2CID 144613877.
- Greenberg, Joseph H. (2000–2002). Indo-European and Its Closest Relatives. Stanford: Stanford University Press. ISBN 978-0-8047-3812-5.
- Patrie, James (1982). The Genetic Relationship of the Ainu Language. Honolulu: University Press of Hawaii. ISBN 978-0-8248-0724-5.
- Shafer, R. (1965). "Studies in Austroasian II". Studia Orientalia. 30 (5).
- Street, John C. (1962). "Review of N. Poppe, Vergleichende Grammatik der altaischen Sprachen, Teil I (1960)". Language. 38 (1): 92–98. doi:10.2307/411195. JSTOR 411195.

== See also ==
- the Glossed Audio Corpus of Ainu Folklore
- List of Proto-Ainu reconstructions (Wiktionary)
- Ainu music
- Kannari Matsu
- Kyōsuke Kindaichi
- Category:Ainu language (Wiktionary)
- Bibliography of the Ainu
