= Ishikari Ainu =

Subgroup of the Ainu people in Japan

The Ishikari Ainu (Japanese: 石狩アイヌ, Ainu: イシカラ・ウン・クル, Ishkar-un-kur) are a subgroup of the Hokkaido Ainu people, residing generally in the Ishikari river basin (former Ishikari province, now the Ishikari, Sorachi, and Kamikawa subprefectures), excluding the Ainu who live near Chitose River. Around the 17th century, it was one of the most powerful Ainu subgroups on Hokkaido, along with the Shumukuru Ainu and Menashikuru Ainu to the south and southeast, respectively. Their numbers have declined sharply since.

== Origins ==
The origins of the Ishikari subgroup, like the general Ainu people, is unclear and is still undergoing research. Archaeologist Haruo Oi posits that Ainu settled around the Ishikari river basin after the destruction of the Northern Fujiwara clan around the end of the Satsumon culture, as a part of the greater Ainu migration out of Tohoku. Furthermore, Haukase, a 17th-century Ishikari Ainu chief, stated that "we are ancestors of the Takaoka (currently Hirosaki), went to the Tsugaru Peninsula for maritime trade".

== History ==
=== 1600s ===
Though there are no records detailing the Ishikari Ainu pre-1600s, Around the time of Shakushain's rise to power in the mid 17th-century, the aforementioned Haukase was building a large native force to influence the Ainu living in the Ishikari river basin from Mashike to Otaru. He succeeded, and established an alliance with the Uryu Ainu as well, making him one of the most prominent Ainu figures at the time.

In the face of Shakushain's revolts and general turbulence on Hokkaido, Haukase consistently stayed neutral. Even after the end of Shakushain's Revolt, Haukase resisted the Matsumae clan's embargo on Ainu goods and demands for submission. However, as other Ainu clans, wishing to resume trade with the Matsumae, led to Haukase eventually conceding and submitting to Matsumae hegemony.

=== Recent History ===
To stimulate trade, the Matsumae established the "Thirteen Posts of Ishikari", headed under thirteen powerful Matsumae merchants. Under the Matsumae Clan's domination, autonomy by the Ishikari Ainu became difficult to exercise, and they found their way of life constantly threatened by the Japanese traders who now visited the Ishikari River often.

In 1723, over 200 Ishikari Ainu starved to death due to a poor bounty of autumn salmon. In 1780, over 647 Ishikari Ainu due to a smallpox pandemic, and more than 800 died to another pandemic in 1818. The Ishikari Ainus' population sharply declined since, due to the destruction of traditional ways of life and introduction of infectious diseases, from over three thousand in 1809 to around 600 in 1855.

During the Meiji Restoration, the number of Japanese immigrants increased dramatically. The Ishikari Ainu were forced to adapt to new ways of life under the rapidly industrializing government. Hiromichi Kono, a Japanese anthropologist in the early 1900s, hypothesized that the Shumukuru Ainu were a subgroup of the Ishikari Ainu on examination of Ainu tombstones. Today, there is no more distinction between the various subgroups of Hokkaido Ainu, and descendants of the Ishikari subgroup are among many Ainu today.
