= Sumunkur Ainu =

Subgroup of the Ainu people in Japan

The Sumunkur Ainu (Katakana: スムンクㇽ, literally "west in people", i.e. "Western people") is the name of the Ainu subgroup living along the southern coast of Hokkaido, traditionally from Iburi to Hidaka. The subgroup is known to have fought with the Menasunkur Ainu to the east in the 17th century. In Japanese texts, they were also called the Haekuru Ainu (Ainu hay-kur) and the Sarunkuru Ainu (Ainu sar-un-kur, "plains-on-people", "people on the plains").

== Area of distribution ==
Kumajiro Uehara, an early explorer of Hokkaido, documented in his book "Ezo Place Names and History": "the Ezo (Ainu) from Niigapu to Shirawoi" as the "Shumunkuru". According to this description, the Pacific coastal area from Niikappu to the area around Shiraoi is the area of residence of the Sumunkur.

According to Hiromichi Kono, who studied Ainu grave markers, Sumunkur Ainu-type gravestones were distributed in the area from Shizunai to Chitose and Muroran. In Shizunai, at the eastern boundary, it was mixed with Menasunkur Ainu-type tombstones, and near Mount Usu (west of Muroran), Sumunkur-type gravestones were mixed with Uchiura Ainu types. The male grave marker is shaped like an arrowhead, and the female grave marker was like "a thick tree with a hole at the top and shaped like a needle head". The Sumunkur Ainu also had other significantly different cultural characteristics from their Ainu neighbors, not just in the grave system.

== History ==
In ancient times, the Japanese noted the presence of a "Hinomoto" (people of the east) were established on the Pacific coast of Hokkaido. It can be believed this group were the ancestors of the Sumunkur Ainu.

In the 1600s, the Sumunkur Ainu gradually came into conflict with the Menasunkur Ainu. In 1653, the Sumunkur chief Onibishi killed the Menasunkur chief Camoktain. Shakushain, who succeeded Camoktain as head chief, retaliated by waging war on the Sumunkur and killing Onibishi. Shakushain then went on to declare war on the Matsumae Domain, stationed on the very south of Hokkaido, in Shakushain's Revolts, before being defeated and killed.

After Shakushain's Revolt, the control of the Ainu people by the Matsumae domain strengthened considerably. In modern Hokkaido, the population density of the Ainu people is high in the Iburi and Hidaka regions, and there is a theory that this may be because the Sumunkur were more friendly to the Matsumae domain than the Menasunkur Ainu and Ishikari Ainu (another subgroup located to the north of the Sumunkur Ainu).
