= Kamchadals =

Mixed Russian-indigenous ethnic group of Kamchatka, Russia

Камчадалы

Regions with significant populations
- Russia: Kamchatka: 1551 (2010); Magadan Oblast: 280 (2010): 1,927
- Japan: 100

Languages
- Russian

Religion
- Russian Orthodoxy

Related ethnic groups
- Itelmens, Ainu, Koryaks, Chuvans

The Kamchadals (Russian: камчадалы, IPA: [kɐmʲtɕɪdˈalɨ]) are an ethnic group inhabiting Kamchatka, Russia. The name 'Kamchadal' was originally applied to the descendants of the local Siberians and aboriginal peoples (the Itelmens, Ainu, Koryaks, and Chuvans) who assimilated with the Russians. These descendants of the Russian settlers who mixed with the indigenous peoples in the 18th and 19th centuries are called Kamchadals today. The Kamchadals speak Russian with a touch of local dialects of the aboriginal languages of Kamchatka. The Kamchadals engage in fur trading, fishing, market gardening, and dairy farming, and the majority are of the Russian Orthodox faith. Today, the name 'Kamchadal' may be applied to people who speak, or whose ancestors spoke, one of the Kamchadal languages. This article is about the Kamchadals in the first sense; for the second sense, see Itelmens.

== History ==
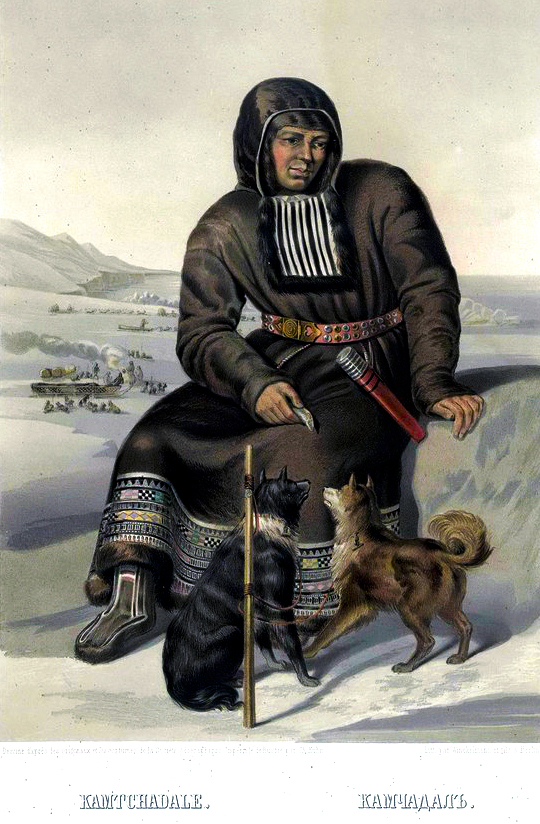
Illustration of a Kamchadal person by Theodore de Pauly, 1862

In 1767 and 1768, a Russian ship brought smallpox to the region for the first time, and it is believed to have killed three‑quarters of the native population. In the journal of Captain James Cook, "The smallpox ... made its appearance in 1767 and 1768. It was brought into the country by a Russian vessel bound to the Eastern islands, for the purpose of hunting otters, foxes, and other animals. The person who had in his blood the fatal germ was a sailor from Okotsk [sic], where he had taken remedies for the disorder previous to his departure; but the recent marks of it were visible. Scarcely landed, he communicated this cruel malady to the poor Kamchadales, which carried off three‑fourths of them." As a result, the Kamchadals were not numerous as an ethnic group after this contact with fur traders.

As a consequence of the Treaty of Saint Petersburg (1875), the Kuril Islands were handed over to Japan, along with their Ainu subjects. A total of 83 North Kuril Ainu arrived in Petropavlovsk-Kamchatsky on 18 September 1877, after they had decided to remain under Russian rule. They refused the offer by Russian officials to move to new reservations in the Commander Islands. Finally, a deal was reached in 1881, and the Ainu decided to settle in the village of Yavin, Kamchatka. In March 1881, the group left Petropavlovsk and began the journey towards Yavin on foot. Four months later, they arrived at their new homes. Another village, Golygino, was founded later. Under Soviet rule, both villages were forced to disband, and the residents were moved to the Russian‑dominated Zaporozhye rural settlement in Ust‑Bolsheretsky Raion. As a result of intermarriage, the three ethnic groups assimilated to form the Kamchadal community.

According to Alexei Nakamura, the Kurile Kamchadals, along with the Ainu living in Russia, are fighting for official recognition. Since the Ainu are not recognised in the official list of the peoples living in Russia, some of them are counted as ethnic Kamchadals.

== See also ==
- Indigenous small-numbered peoples of the North, Siberia and the Far East
