= Bibliography of the Ainu =

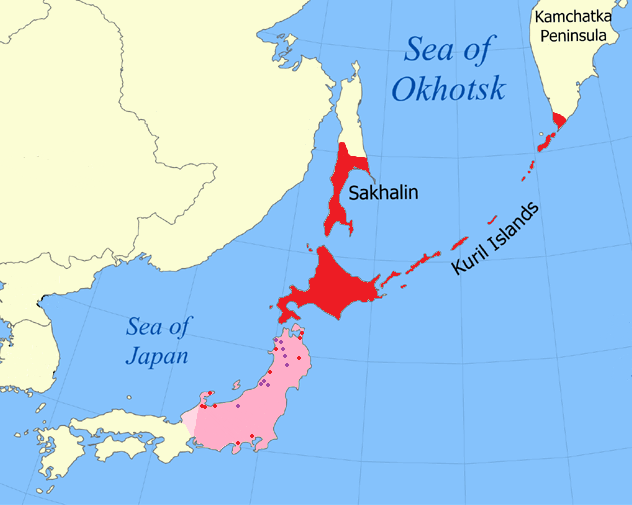
Historical extent of the Ainu.

This is a bibliography of works on the Ainu people of modern Japan and the Russian Far East.

== Overview ==
- Poisson, Barbara Aoki (1 April 2002). The Ainu of Japan. Lerner Publications. ISBN 978-0-8225-4176-9.

== Politics ==
- Siddle, Richard (12 August 1996). Race, Resistance and the Ainu of Japan. Psychology Press. ISBN 978-0-415-13228-2.
- Sjöberg, Katarina (1 January 1993). The Return of the Ainu: Cultural Mobilization and the Practice of Ethnicity in Japan. Psychology Press. ISBN 978-3-7186-5401-7.

== Anthropology ==
Distribution of mitochondrial DNA haplogroups in Hokkaido

- Batchelor, John (1892). The Ainu of Japan: The Religion, Superstitions, and General History of the Hairy Aborigines of Japan. Religious Tract Society.
- Batchelor, John (1901). The Ainu and Their Folk-lore. Religious Tract Society.
- De La Rupelle, Guy (2005). Kayak And Land Journeys in Ainu Mosir: Among the Ainu of Hokkaido. iUniverse. ISBN 978-0-595-34644-8.
- Landor, A. H. Savage (1893). Alone With the Hairy Ainu, or 3,800 Miles on a Pack Saddle In Yezo and a Cruise to the Kurile Islands. London: John Murray.
- Piłsudski, Bronisław (1998). Majewicz, Alfred F. (ed.). The Collected Works of Bronisław Piłsudski: The aborigines of Sakhalin. Walter de Gruyter. ISBN 978-3-11-010928-3.
- Starr, Frederick (1904). The Ainu group at the Saint Louis exposition. The Open court publishing company.
- Tajima A, Hayami M, Tokunaga K, Juji T, Matsuo M, Marzuki S, Omoto K, Horai S (March 2, 2004). "Genetic origins of the Ainu inferred from combined DNA analyses of maternal and paternal lineages". Journal of Human Genetics. 49 (4): 187–193. doi:10.1007/s10038-004-0131-x. PMID 14997363.
- Yamada, Takako (2001). The world view of the Ainu: nature and cosmos reading from language. Kegan Paul. ISBN 978-0-7103-0732-3.
- Noboru A, Tsuneo K, Ryohei T, Hideaki K, Ken-ichi S (October 11, 2017). "Ethnic derivation of the Ainu inferred from ancient mitochondrial DNA data". American Journal of Biological Anthropology. 165 (1): 139–148. doi:10.1002/ajpa.23338. PMC 5765509. PMID 29023628.

== History ==
- Frey, Christopher J. (2007). Ainu Schools and Education Policy in Nineteenth-century Hokkaido, Japan. ISBN 978-0-549-35460-4.
- Peng, Fred C. C.; Geiser, Peter (1977). The Ainu, the past in the present. Bunka Hyoron.

=== Historiography ===
- Refsing, Kirsten (8 November 2002). Early European Writings on Ainu Culture: Religion and Folklore. Psychology Press. ISBN 978-0-7007-1486-5.

== Culture ==
- William W. Fitzhugh; Chisato O. Dubreuil (1999). Ainu: spirit of a northern people. Arctic Studies Center (National Museum of Natural History). Arctic Studies Center, National Museum of Natural History, Smithsonian Institution in association with University of Washington Press. ISBN 978-0-295-97912-0.
- Patia M. Rosenberg (1967). Ainu Music: A Thesis Submitted in Partial Fulfillment ... for the Degree of Master of Arts in Far Eastern Studies. University of Michigan.
- Traditional Ainu Music. N.H.K. 1965.
- Josef Kreiner, ed. (1993). European studies on Ainu language and culture. Iudicium-Verl. ISBN 978-3-89129-486-4.
- Emiko Ohnuki-Tierney (31 August 1981). Illness and Healing Among the Sakhalin Ainu: A Symbolic Interpretation. CUP Archive. ISBN 978-0-521-23636-2.
- Emiko Ohnuki-Tierney (1974). The Ainu of the northwest coast of southern Sakhalin. Holt, Rinehart and Winston. ISBN 978-0-03-006926-0.
- John Batchelor; Kingo Miyabe (1898). Ainu economic plants.
- Matsu Kannari. Kutune Shirka, The Ainu Epic. Forgotten Books. ISBN 978-1-60620-098-8.
- Neil Gordon Munro (February 1979). Ainu, creed and cult. Greenwood Press. ISBN 978-0-313-21151-5.
- Basil Hall Chamberlain; John Batchelor (1887). The Language, Mythology, and Geographical Nomenclature of Japan Viewed in the Light of Aino Studies. Imperial University. p. 1.

=== Language ===
- John Batchelor (1908). An Ainu-English-Japanese Dictionary, including A Grammar of the Ainu Language. Methodist Publishing House.
- Basil Hall Chamberlain; John Batchelor (1887). Ainu grammar. Imperial University. p. 77.
- Hattori, Shirō, ed. (1964). アイヌ語方言辞典 [An Ainu dialect dictionary with Ainu, Japanese, and English indexes]. Tokyo: 岩波書店.
- 萱野茂 (October 2002). 萱野茂のアイヌ語辞典 (in Japanese). 三省堂. ISBN 978-4-385-17052-7.
- Miller, Roy Andrew (1967). The Japanese Language. Tokyo: Charles E. Tuttle.
- Murasaki, Kyōko (1977). Karafuto Ainugo: Sakhalin Rayciska Ainu Dialect—Texts and Glossary. Tokyo: Kokushokankōkai.
- Murasaki, Kyōko (1978). Karafuto Ainugo: Sakhalin Rayciska Ainu Dialect—Grammar. Tokyo: Kokushokankōkai.
- 中川 裕 (February 1995). アイヌ語千歳方言辞典 [The Ainu-Japanese Dictionary, Chitosei Dialect] (in Japanese). 草風館. ISBN 978-4-883-23078-5.
- Bronisław Piłsudski (1998). Alfred F. Majewicz (ed.). The Aborigines of Sakhalin. The Collected Works of Bronisław Piłsudski. Vol. I. Berlin-New York: Walter de Gruyter. p. 792. ISBN 3-11-010928-X.
- Refsing, Kirsten (1986). The Ainu Language: The Morphology and Syntax of the Shizunai Dialect. Aarhus: Aarhus University Press. ISBN 87-7288-020-1.
- Shibatani, Masayoshi (1990). The Languages of Japan. Cambridge: Cambridge University Press. ISBN 0-521-36918-5.
- 田村 すず子 (August 1996). アイヌ語沙流方言辞典 [The Ainu-Japanese Dictionary, Saru Dialect] (in Japanese). 草風館. ISBN 978-4-883-23093-8.
- Tamura, Suzuko (2000). The Ainu Language. Tokyo: Sanseido. ISBN 4-385-35976-8.
- Vovin, Alexander (1992). "The origins of the Ainu language". The Third International Symposium on Language and Linguistics. Chulalongkorn University: 672–686.
- Vovin, Alexander (1993). A Reconstruction of Proto-Ainu. Leiden: Brill. ISBN 90-04-09905-0.
- Vovin, Alexander (August 1997). A Reconstruction of Proto-Ainu. Brill Academic Publishers. ISBN 978-9-004-09905-0.
- Vovin, Alexander (2008). "Man'yōshū to Fudoki ni Mirareru Fushigina Kotoba to Jōdai Nihon Retto ni Okeru Ainugo no Bunpu" [Strange Words in the Man'yoshū and the Fudoki and the Distribution of the Ainu Language in the Japanese Islands in Prehistory] (PDF). International Research Center for Japanese Studies. Archived from the original (PDF) on 2014-02-11.

Proposed classifications

- Bengtson, John D. (2006). "A multilateral look at Greater Austric". Mother Tongue. 11: 219–258.
- Georg, Stefan; Michalove, Peter A.; Ramer, Alexis Manaster; Sidwell, Paul J. (1999). "Telling general linguists about Altaic". Journal of Linguistics. 35. Cambridge: Cambridge University Press: 65–98. doi:10.1017/s0022226798007312. S2CID 144613877.
- Greenberg, Joseph H. (2000–2002). Indo-European and Its Closest Relatives. Stanford: Stanford University Press. ISBN 0-8047-3812-2.
- Patrie, James (1982). The Genetic Relationship of the Ainu Language. Honolulu: The University Press of Hawaii. ISBN 0-8248-0724-3.
- Shafer, R. (1965). "Studies in Austroasian II". Studia Orientalia. 30 (5).
- Street, John C. (1962). "Review of N. Poppe, Vergleichende Grammatik der altaischen Sprachen, Teil I (1960)". Language. 38: 92–98. doi:10.2307/411195. JSTOR 411195.

== Articles ==
- Crossley-Holland, Peter, ed. (1968). "Music of the Ainu". Proceedings of the Centennial Workshop on Ethnomusicology held at the University of British Columbia, Vancouver, June 19-23, 1967.
- H.R.M. (1894-01-11). "Fresh Light on the Ainu". Nature. 49 (1263): 248. Bibcode:1894Natur..49..248H. doi:10.1038/049248b0.
- Sternberg, Leo (1906). "The Inau Cult of the Ainu". In Laufer, Berthold (ed.). Boas anniversary volume: anthropological papers written in honor of Franz Boas ... New York: G.E. Stechert & Co.

== Gallery ==
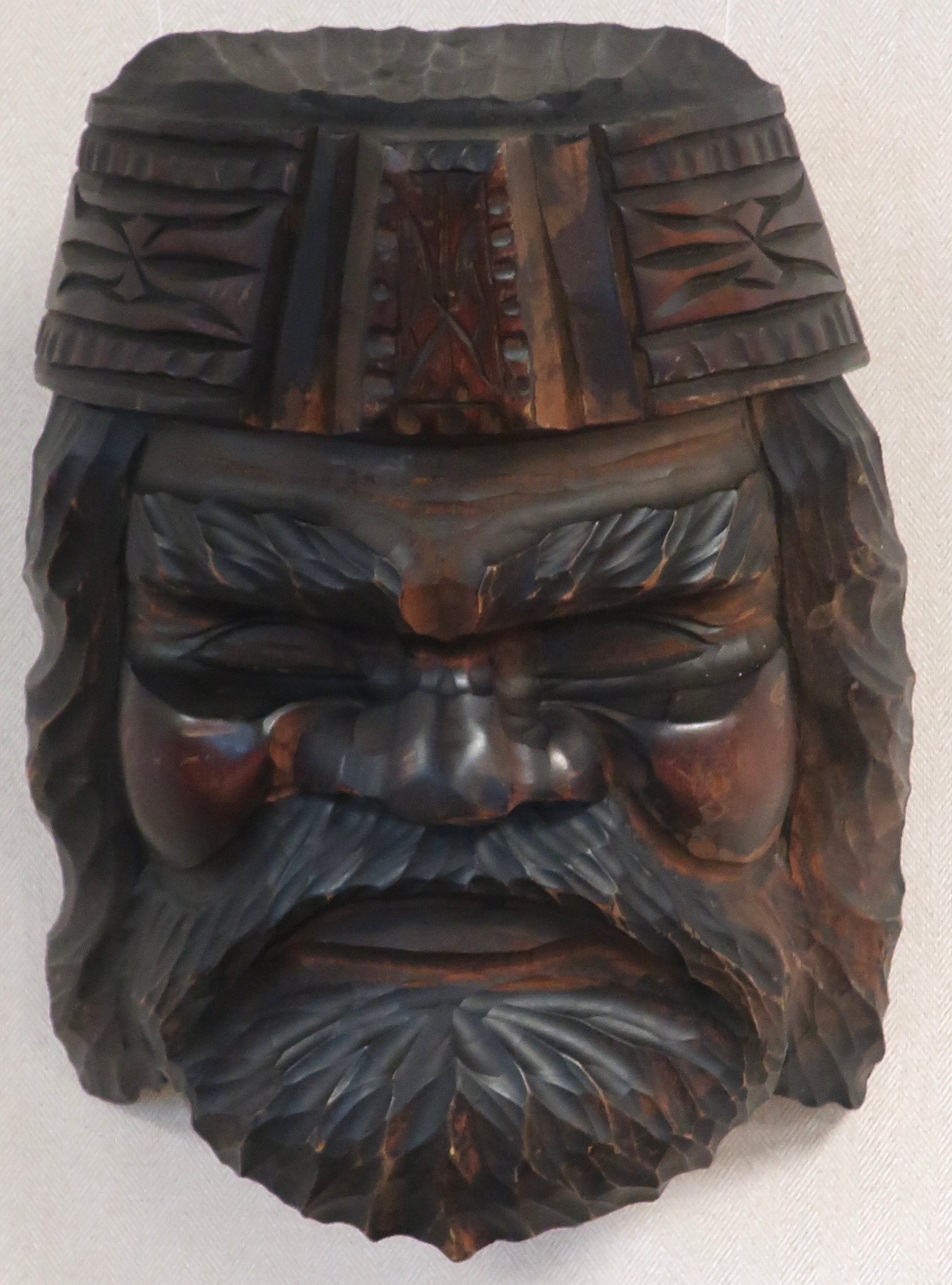
Ainu mask carved by J. Haraya, 1947, Sapporo, Hokkaido, Japan, wood, at the East–West Center, University of Hawaii

== See also ==
- Filmography of the Ainu
