= Uepeker =

Type of Ainu oral literature and folktales

Uepeker (Ainu: ウエペケㇾ, lit. 'old tale') are Ainu folktales, and form part of Ainu oral literature. In Sakhalin, the term "uchashkuma" is used, and in other areas the term "tuitak" is used.

== Etymology ==
The term u'uepekere may be a more accurate term to be used. It comes from u (mutuality prefix), ue (thereby), and pekere (bright). Ainu linguist Chiri Mashiho described the term's meaning as "mutually inquiring after news".

== General ==
Uepeker are short stories told as actual experiences of people of the past. According to former Ainu politician Shigeru Kayano, the stories were essentially parts of dialogue between the natural world and human morality, and were responsible for moral and other forms of education.

== People ==
- Shigeru Kayano retold uepeker in some of his books.
- Toshi Ueda is a famous reteller of uepeker.

== Bibliography ==
- "Oral Literature". Ainu History and Culture. Ainu Museum Poroto Kotan. Archived from the original on 2019-01-09.
- Frey, Christopher J. Ainu Schools and Education Policy in Nineteenth-century Hokkaido, Japan (PhD thesis). Indiana University.

== See also ==
- Yukar
