= Sakhalin Ainu language =

Extinct language of Sakhalin, Russia

Sakhalin Ainu
- Saghilin Ainu
- カバフト アイヌ イタㇵ kabahuto aynu itah
- Native to: Russia
- Region: Sakhalin, later Hokkaido
- Ethnicity: Sakhalin Ainu
- Extinct: 30 April 1994, with the death of Take Asai
- Language family: Ainu: Sakhalin Ainu
- Dialects: Taraika; Rayciska

Language codes
- ISO 639-3: –
- Glottolog: sakh1245
- IETF: ain-u-sd-rusak
- Sakhalin Ainu is classified as Extinct by the UNESCO Atlas of the World's Languages in Danger

Sakhalin Ainu is an extinct Ainu language, or perhaps several Ainu languages, that was or were spoken on the island of Sakhalin, now part of Russia.

== History and present situation ==
The Ainu of Sakhalin appear to have been present on Sakhalin relatively early. Linguistic evidence shows that proto-Ainu was spoken in southern Sakhalin and northeastern Hokkaido and expanded from this region into the rest of Hokkaido, the Kurils and partially northern Honshu. Later Sakhalin Ainu expanded from southern Sakhalin into northern Sakhalin and possibly the Amur region.

Lee & Hasegawa (2013) argued that the Ainu are significantly linked to the Okhotsk culture of northern Hokkaido, whereas other scholars associate the culture with the Nivkh people, whom the Ainu may have displaced.

Oral history records Ainu displacement of a people in central Sakhalin that they called the Tonchi, who, based on toponymic evidence, were Nivkh.

The earliest attested records of Sakhalin Ainu were several sentences transcribed by the Dutch explorer Maarten Gerritszoon Vries in 1643. In 1787, the French explorer Lapérouse recorded 161 Sakhalin Ainu words.

After World War II, when Sakhalin came under Soviet control, all but 100 of the Ainu living in Sakhalin were deported to Japan. The last Ainu household on the island died out in the 1960s. The language survived longer in Japan, going extinct in 1994 with the death of Tahkonanna.

Currently, there is a movement among Sakhalin Ainu born and raised in Hokkaido and Honshu to preserve their language and culture, such as the Sakhalin Ainu Association (樺太アイヌ協会).

== Dialects ==
Sakhalin Ainu may have been more than a single language. Information about linguistic diversity throughout Sakhalin island and among Sakhalin Ainu dialects is scant.

At present, two can be said to be the best documented dialects – the dialect from the settlement of Rayciska (来知志 – ライチシ), on the western coast of Sakhalin on the Strait of Tartary near modern Uglegorsk and the dialect from Tarayka (多来加 – タライカ), facing the Gulf of Patience near Poronaysk on the eastern coast.

Linguistic material on both dialects comes in the shape of transcriptions, recordings and transliterations of narratives and conversations. These were elicited from Ainu native speakers who lived either on Sakhalin or in Hokkaido, after they had been deported from Russia to Japan. A number of narratives from the south-eastern coast of Sakhalin were also elicited by Piłsudski from native speakers living in the Ainu settlements of Ay, Hunup, Takoye, Sieraroko, Ocohpoka, Otasan down to Tunayci, nearby today's Tunay Lake (Russian: Озеро Тунайча). These dialects appear to be strikingly similar to the Tarayka dialect. Nevertheless, the eastern coastal variety of Tarayka is reported to be divergent from other southern varieties. Scanty data from Western voyages at the turn of the 19th–20th century suggest there was also great diversity further north.

== Phonology and orthography ==
Sakhalin Ainu differed from Hokkaido Ainu in having long vowels. In words which historically had (and in Hokkaido Ainu still have) syllable-final /p, t, k, ɾ/, these consonants lenited and merged to /x/. After an /i/, this /x/ was pronounced [ç].

In Japan, final /x/ was written as a small katakana h with an echo vowel, and is transliterated as h. Thus アㇵ ah, イㇶ ih, ウㇷ uh, エㇸ eh, オㇹ oh.

Historically, Sakhalin Ainu was also written in Cyrillic, as in the case of Sentoku Taroji (千徳太郎治) who wrote a letter to the Polish ethnologist Bronisław Piłsudski in 1903.
