= Bible translations into Ainu =

Translation of the Christian Bible for the indigenous people of northern Japan

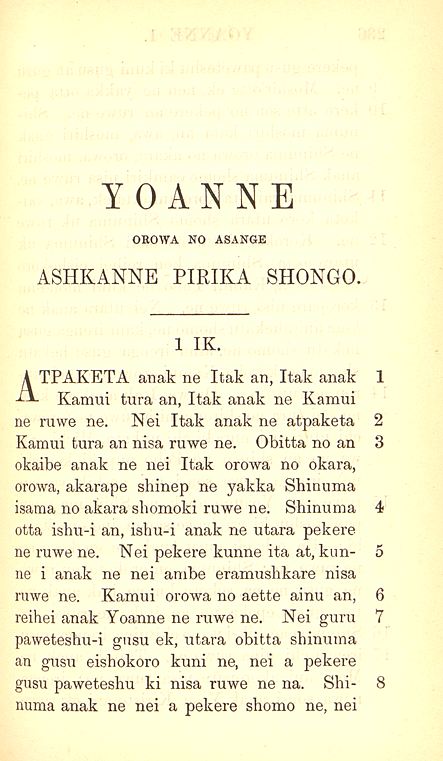
Beginning of the Gospel of John in Latin-script Ainu

The first biblical text in Ainu language appeared in 1887, when a tentative edition of 250 copies of Matthew 1-9, translated from the Greek with the aid of the Revised Version, by John Batchelor, assisted by a local Ainu, was published. Darlow and Moule date this first tentative edition of Matthew i–ix to 1886, and record it as printed at Tokyo for the British and Foreign Bible Society. Matthew and Jonah, by the same translator, were issued in 1889, the proofs being read by Mr. George Braithwaite, the agent of the British and Foreign Bible Society in Japan. In 1891 Mr. Batchelor returned to England and published the remaining Gospels, which appeared at London that year. In 1893 a tentative edition of 300 each of Galatians, Ephesians, and Philippians, by the same translator, was published at Yokohama by a joint committee of the three Bible Societies (British and Foreign, American, and National of Scotland), each epistle carrying a separate title page in Ainu and English. The epistles of James, Peter, John and Jude followed at Yokohama in 1894, and the Book of Psalms in 1896. In 1897 a revised New Testament, by the same translator, with Ainu aid, was published at Yokohama by the joint committee; in this first complete New Testament the four Gospels were revised. Batchelor published a version of Genesis 1–3 privately in 1898, after which he abandoned further translation work.

The 1897 New Testament carries the Ainu title Chikoro utarapa ne Yesu Kiristo ashiri aeuitaknup oma kambi, given on its English title page as The New Testament of our Lord and Saviour Jesus Christ in Ainu. It was printed at Yokohama by the Yokohama Bunsha for the Bible Societies' Committee for Japan. The Japan Bible Society issued a facsimile of it in 1981.

| Translation | John 3:16 |
|---|---|
| Batchelor, 1897 | Inambe gusu ne yakun, Kamui anak ne koro Shinen ne Poho koropare pakno moshiri omap ruwe ne, nen ne yakka nei Poho eishokoro guru obitta aisamka shomoki no nei pakno ne yakka ishu ramat koro kuni ne kore nisa ruwe ne. |

== List of Bible translations into Ainu ==
The editions below are those recorded by Darlow and Moule, whose collation of the British and Foreign Bible Society's holdings supplies the dates, places and extents.

- John Batchelor (1886). A Matteu orowa no asange pirika orushpe [The Gospel of Matthew i–ix in Ainu] (tentative edition) (in Ainu). Tokyo: British and Foreign Bible Society. p. 28.
- John Batchelor (1889). Chikoro utarapa ne Yesu Kiristo ashiri ekambakte-i: a Matteu orowa no asange pirika orushpe [The Gospel of Matthew in Ainu] (in Ainu). Tokyo: British and Foreign Bible Society. p. 110.
- John Batchelor (1889). Kamui fushko ekambakte-i: Yona orushpe [The Book of Jonah in Ainu] (in Ainu). Tokyo: British and Foreign Bible Society. p. 7.
- John Batchelor (1891). Chikoro utarapa ne Yesu Kiristo ashiri ekambakte-i: Markos, Roukos, newa Yoanne orowa no asange ashkanne pirika shongo = St. Mark, St. Luke, and St. John in Ainu (in Ainu). London: British and Foreign Bible Society. p. 348 – via HathiTrust.
- John Batchelor (1893). Galatians, Ephesians and Philippians in Ainu (tentative edition of 300 copies each) (in Ainu). Yokohama: Bible Societies' Committee for Japan. p. 63.
- John Batchelor (1894). The Epistles of SS. James, Peter, John, and Jude in Ainu (in Ainu). Yokohama: Bible Societies' Committee. p. 83.
- John Batchelor (1896). Kamui Fushko aeuitaknup, Iyohaichish: the book of psalms [The Psalms in Ainu] (in Ainu). Yokohama: Bible Societies' Committee for Japan. p. 228.
- John Batchelor (1897). Chikoro utarapa ne Yesu Kiristo ashiri aeuitaknup oma kambi = The New Testament of our Lord and Saviour Jesus Christ in Ainu (in Ainu). [Yokohama]: Printed for the Bible Societies' Committee for Japan by the Yokohama Bunsha. p. 706. OCLC 23260602 – via Internet Archive.
- John Batchelor (1898). Genesis 1–3 in Ainu (published privately by the translator) (in Ainu).
- John Batchelor (1981) [1897]. Chikoro Utarapa ne Yesu Kiristo Ashiri Aeuitaknup oma kambi: the New Testament of Our Lord and Saviour Jesus Christ in Ainu (facsimile of the 1897 edition) (in Ainu). Japan Bible Society.
