= Take Asai =

Last fluent speaker of the Sakhalin Ainu language (1902–1994)

Take Asai (浅井タケ) or Tahkonanna (Ainu: タㇵコナンナ) (5 April 1902 – 30 April 1994) was the last fluent speaker of the Sakhalin Ainu language. She was born in Otasu Kotan (today near present-day Krasnogorsk on the west coast of Sakhalin), then part of the Russian Empire. She moved to Rayciska (Raichishika, near present-day Uglegorsk) during her childhood. After World War II she was relocated to Hokkaido and toward the end of her life lived in an old-age home in Monbetsu, Hidaka, Hokkaido. She served as an informant with the Piłsudski Research Project and other ethnographic projects until her death in 1994.
