= Filmography of the Ainu =

Films of ethnic group in Japan and Russia

This is a filmography of films and videos that portray the life and culture of the Ainu people of what is now northern Japan and the fringe of the Russian Far East. Representations of the Ainu can vary from the strictly documentary to the fictional and, as with representations of Native Americans in Hollywood cinema, may suffer from distortions and stereotypes.

The list is divided between documentaries and fiction films.

== Documentaries ==
- A Record of the Shiraoi Ainu (1925)
- The Ainu Bear Ceremony (1931)
- Uepotara—A Traditional Exorcism Rite of the Nibutani Ainu (1933)
- Chisenomi (1934)
- Kita no dōhō (北の同胞) (Riken Kagaku, 1941)
- Kotan no hitotachi (1959), NHK documentary
- Words: The Symbol of a People (1993), directed by Shiro Kayano
- Kyōsei e no michi: Nihon no senjū minzoku Ainu (1993)
- The Despised Ainu People (October 1994)
- Shin kyōsei e no michi: Nihon no senjū minzoku Ainu (2000)
- TOKYO Ainu (2010)
- Kamui to ikiru (2011), directed by Hideki Komatsu
- Ainu. Pathways to Memory (2013), directed by Marcos Centeno

== Fiction films ==
- Rira no hana wasureji (リラの花忘れじ) (Shochiku, 1947), directed by Kenkichi Hara
- Jakoman to Tetsu (ジャコ万と鉄) (Toho, 1949), directed by Senkichi Taniguchi
- Gorotsuki-bune (ごろつき船) (Daiei Film, 1950), directed by Kazuo Mori
- Kimi no na wa (君の名は) (Shochiku, 1953–54), directed by Hideo Ōba
- Kotan no kuchibue (コタンの口笛) (Toho, 1957), directed by Mikio Naruse
- Daisōgen no wataridori (大草原の渡り鳥) (Nikkatsu, 1960), directed by Buichi Saitō
- Mito Kōmon umi o wataru (水戸黄門海を渡る) (Daiei Film, 1961), directed by Kunio Watanabe
- Rex: A Dinosaur's Story (REX 恐竜物語) (1993), directed by Haruki Kadokawa
- Kita no reinen (北の零年) (2004), directed by Isao Yukisada
- Ainu Mosir (2020)
