= Uchiura Ainu =

Ethnic group in northern Japan

The Uchiura Ainu (Japanese: 内浦アイヌ) are a subgroup of the Hokkaido Ainu people, residing near the Uchiura Bay of the Oshima peninsula. The name "Uchiura Ainu" was given by Japanese historian Mineo Kaiho, and the name the Uchiura Ainu gave themselves is unknown. Many of its specific cultural heritages and ways of life were also unclear and in decline early on, due to the Uchiura Ainus' proximity to early Matsumae domains.

== History ==
According to the "Tsugaru Issei" (津軽 一統志), around the time of Shakushain's Rebellion (1669–1672) the Ainus residing on Uchiura Bay were under the authority of one chief Aikouin, its powers relatively diminished compared to the other Ainu subgroups. Though originally siding with the Matsumae Domains in the early stages of Shakushain's conflicts, Aikouin switched sides when Shakushain's movement picked up major steam, contacting the Menasunkur Ainu in East Hokkaido to persuade them and conducted spying on Matsumae. However, when Shakushain's Revolt was violently stamped down in the Battle of Kunnui, Aikouin's resolve was battered and the Uchiura Ainu never openly rebelled against the Matsumae again.

There is very little information regarding the Uchiura Ainu following Shakushain's Rebellion, though Hokkaido explorer Kumajiro Uehara records the following:

In addition, the Ezo (Ainu) from our office [in Shizunai] to the side of Poroizumi (Erimo) are collectively called the Menasunkur... The Ezo from Oshamambe to Mori are called the Ushikeshunkur, their rule reaching to the end of the bay, while the Ezo from Shikabe to Toi are called the Horebashiunkur, with their rule extending offshore...

— Kumajiro Uehara, Place Names of Ezo

Thus, it can be assumed that the Uchiura Ainu, who have once been commanded by Aikouin, have dispersed into the Ushikeshunkur and Horebashiunkur subgroups in the 18th century. It can also be assumed that the descendants of the Uchiura Ainu assimilated into Japanese culture post-18th century and into the present day, their former ways of life disappearing.
