= Mogami Tokunai =

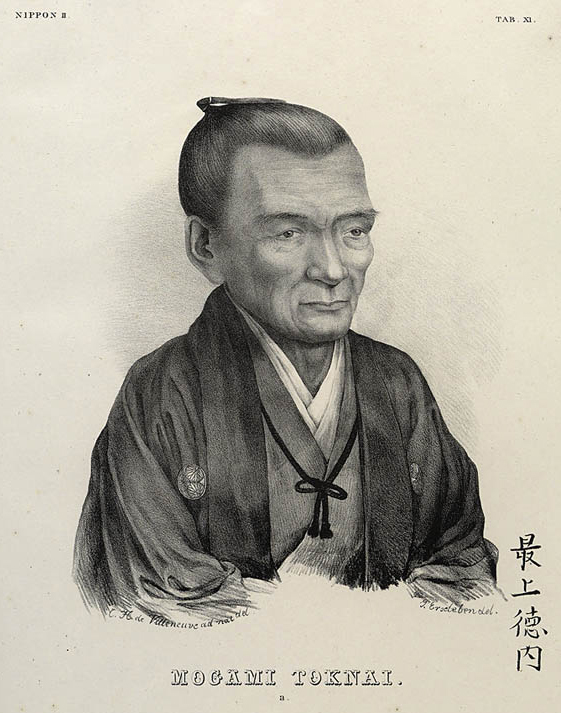
- Mogami Tokunai in 1826
- Born: 1755; Dewa Province
- Died: 1836 (aged 80–81)

Mogami Tokunai (最上 徳内; c. 1755 – October 14, 1836) was a Japanese samurai, geographer and explorer.

Mogami was born in Dewa Province in what is now part of Yamagata Prefecture).

He explored and mapped Hokkaido and Sakhalin and some of the Kuril Islands in 1785–1786. In his reports to the Tokugawa shogunate, he emphasized the need to defend the islands. He compiled a preliminary Ainu-Japanese dictionary in Ezo Soshi.

== Selected works ==
In a statistical overview derived from writings by and about Mogami Tokunai, OCLC/WorldCat encompasses roughly 20+ works in 40+ publications in 3 languages and 130+ library holdings.

- 蝦夷草紙 (1790)
- 蝦夷國風俗人情之沙汰 (1791)
- 蝦夷方言藻汐草 (1804)
- 度量衡統 (1804)
