= Kuril Ainu language =

Extinct language of the Kuril Islands

Kuril Ainu
- Native to: Russia, Japan
- Region: Kuril Islands, later Kamchatka and Hokkaidō
- Ethnicity: Kuril Ainu
- Extinct: 1962
- Language family: Ainu: Kuril Ainu

Language codes
- ISO 639-3: –
- Glottolog: kuri1271
- Kuril Ainu is classified as Extinct by the UNESCO Atlas of the World's Languages in Danger

Kuril Ainu is an extinct and poorly attested Ainu language of the Kuril Islands. The main inhabited islands were Kunashir, Iturup and Urup in the south, and Shumshu in the north. Other islands either had small populations (such as Paramushir) or were visited for fishing or hunting. There may have been a small mixed Kuril–Itelmen population at the southern tip of the Kamchatka Peninsula.

The Ainu of the Kurils appear to have been a relatively recent expansion from Hokkaidō, displacing an indigenous Okhotsk culture, which may have been related to the modern Itelmens. When the Kuril Islands passed to Japanese control in 1875, many of the northern Kuril Ainu evacuated to Ust-Bolsheretsky District in Kamchatka, where about 100 still live. In the decades after the islands passed to Soviet control in 1945, most of the remaining southern Kuril Ainu evacuated to Hokkaidō, where they have since been assimilated.
