= Ainu Times =

Ainu language magazine

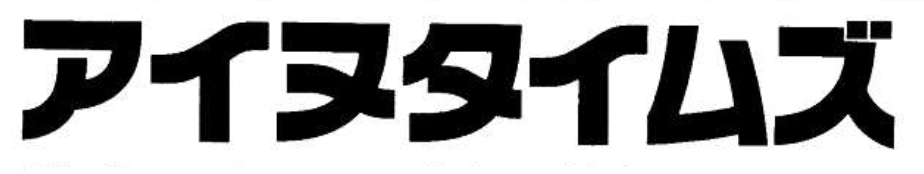
- Editor: Takashi Hamada
- Frequency: Quarterly
- Founded: 1997
- Company: Ainu Pen Club
- Country: Japan
- Language: Ainu; Japanese

The Ainu Times is the only magazine published in the Ainu language, hosted by the Ainu Pen Club. Its first edition was published for 20 March 1997. It uses both special katakana and romanizations in its articles. Its editor as of 2006 is guitarist Takashi Hamada. It is published four times a year. A Japanese version of each issue, containing Japanese translations of the issue's contents, is published three months after the issue's initial publication.

In 2022, the paper celebrated its 25th anniversary.
