= Menasunkur Ainu =

Subgroup of the Ainu people in Japan

The Menasunkur Ainu (Katakana: メナシクル) are an Ainu subgroup living on the eastern Hokkaido coast near Shizunai. Shakushain, the leader of the Menasunkur Ainu, led the Shakushain Revolts, the first large-scale attempt by the Ainu to dislodge the encroaching Japanese onto Hokkaido. The meaning of menas-un-kur is "the eastern people"; there is a theory that the Ainu adapted the concept "east" from Japanese peoples and adapted it into their name later.

== Area of distribution ==
The Tsugaru Issei, a historiographic encyclopedia created in the early 18th century, cites that a vast area encompassing Shizunai to Kushiro and Akkeshi was the domain of the Menasunkur Ainu; there are theories that the Menasunkur Ainu were a large confederacy governed by chiefs like Shakushain, though more recent theories posit Menasunkur's power is much more limited. Haruo Oi, an ethnologist, believes the Menasunkur Ainu at the time of Shakushain was more limited to only the Shizunai and Monbetsu river basins.

Nearly a century following Shakushain's Revolt, Kumajiro Uehara, a Hokkaido historian, documents the Ainu from Hiroo to Nemuro were called the "Shimenashunkuru". He also describes the Menasunkur Ainu living in Eastern Hokkaido being split into two further subgroups; those who lived in south Hidaka and those in the Tokachi-Nemuro area. Hiromichi Kono, a researcher on Ainu grave markers, finds that distinctly-Menasunkur grave markers were distributed in the area from southern Hidaka to Kushiro and Abashiri, east of Shizunai. While most Menasunkur male grave markers looked like Y-shaped trees, the female grave markers had two types: one akin to a thick tree with a constriction at the top, and another akin to a clove-shaped tree, in Tokachi and Uchiura Bay respectively.

Additionally, a distinct type of chashi (Ainu fort) was found only in the areas of Menasunkur. There is a theory that this is because the Menasunkur is based on an eastern group that adapted Ainu culture far later than western Ainu subgroups, and there were conflicts in the process of "Ainuization" later.

== History ==
The first records of the Menasunkur Ainu come from a foreigner Spaniard, Angelis, who records in 1618 the shiploads from Menashi "to the east of the Matsumae" load dried salmon, herring, and sea otter skins, not dissimilar to ones found in Europe.

In the mid-17th century, political struggles with the Sumunkur Ainu, its western neighbor, intensified. Tensions escalated when the Sumunkur chief Onibishi killed the Menasunkur chief of Camoktain before the Matsumae clan were forced to mediate. However, Shakushain (Camoktain's successor) defeated Onibishi, and marched into Matsumae territory before defeated in the event known as Shakushain's Revolt.

After the Battle of Shakushain, the control of Menasunkur by the Matsumae Domain further strengthened; areas east of Nemuro, which had not been controlled by the Matsumae Domain, were also affected too. In 1789, Menasunkur Ainu who lived in Kunashir Island (on the eastern end of Hokkaido) started a conflict between Ainu of Kunashir and Menasunkur which was also suppressed by the Matsumae domain. Slowly, the distinctions between the various Ainu subgroups blurred as Japanese colonization of Hokkaido continued steadily, and the descendants of the Menasunkur Ainu continue to live in the historically Menasunkur-populated regions of Hokkaido.
