= List of ethnic groups in Russia =

The Russian Federation is a multinational state with over 190 ethnic groups designated as nationalities. Population of these groups varies enormously, from millions in the case of e.g. Russians and Tatars to under ten thousand in the case of e.g. Samis and Kets. Among 85 subjects which constitute the Russian Federation, there are 21 national republics (meant to be home to a specific ethnic minority), 5 autonomous okrugs (usually with substantial or predominant ethnic minority) and an autonomous oblast.

The table below gives the population of various ethnic groups of Russia according to the 2002 Russian Census.

== A ==
Group	Pop
Abadzekhi	148
Abaza	21
Abaziny	37,908
Abzhuijtsy	7
Abkhaz	11,357
Avaral	31
Avartsy	756,839
Avstriijtsy	261
Afrorossiyane	30,000
Agintsy	10
Agul shuij	20
Agulars	28
Agultsy	13,274
Aguls	14,975
Adaij	17
Adzhareli	10
Adzhartsy	242
Adygeijtsy	128,262
Adyge	152
Azerbaijdzhanly	505
Azerbaijdzhanlylar	2
Azerbaijdzhantsy	621,270
Aijsory	44
Akkintsy	94
Alabugatskie Tatar	6
Alai	40
Albantsy	266
Aleuty	526
Alzhirtsy	393
Altaij-kizhi	10
Altaijtsy	67,220
Alutalu	3
Alyutortsy	3
Amgun beijenin	3
Amerikantsy	1,275
Angaginas	6
Anglichane	529
Andal	4
Andii	10
Andiijtsy	21,770
Ankalyn	1
Apokvayamyl`o	1
Apsua	1
Apukintsy	3
Arabi	14
Araby	5,813
Araby ob'edinennykh arabskikh emiratov	61
Araby sredneaziatskie	167
Araviijtsy	19
Assyrian	4
Argyns	3
Armenians	1,130,304
Arnauty	5
Archis	77
Archib	1
Archintsy	11
Asori	17
Assiriijtsy	13,545
Assuraijya	11
Astrakhanskie Tatar	1,991
Atali	4
Aturaya	6
Aukshtaijty	2
Aukhovtsy	10
Afgantsy	7,945
Akhvalal	3
Akhvakhtsy	6,368
Akhtintsy	12
Ashval'	2
Ashvatl	3
Ashkenaz	5
Ashkharua	4
Ashkhartsy	7

== B ==
Group	Pop
Bagvalaly	1
Bagvalintsy	10
Bagulav	6
Bagulaly	14
Badzhavidzh	13
Badzhuvedzh	1
Badzhuvtsy	1
Badzhuijtsy	6
Balkartsy	108,412
Baluch	5
Bnei isroil	1
Baraba	5
Barabintsy	7
Baryaat	5
Bakhreijntsy	2
Bashkirs	1,672,356
Bezhtintsy	6,192
Belarusy	23,043
Belorusy	784,896
Beludzhi	81
Bengali	68
Bengaltsy	421
Bepsya	3
Bersh	8
Besermyane (armene)	3,117
Besleneevtsy	3
Beslenei	1
Beshermyane (armene)	5
Bzhedugi	15
Bzybtsy	1
Boijki	2
Bolgary	31,965
Bolshie derbety	3
Botlikhtsy	16
Bokharly	9
Breschuki	3
Bukovintsy	3
Buryaad	3
Buryaty	444,509
Bukharskie evrei (Jewish)	14
Bukhartsy	6

== V ==
Group	Pop
Vadu	17
Vadyakko	2
Vengry	3,645
Vepsians	8,192
Vepsya	13
Verkhovintsy	1
Vetluzhskie mariijtsy (Cheremiss)	13
Viryal	2
Voguly	29
Vod	71
Voijkypal`o	1
Volokh	12
Vostochnye(uralskie) mariijtsy (Cheremiss)	255
Votyaki	28
Voyampoltsy	1
Vuluguni	3
Vutla mari	1
Vet ngoij	1
Vetnamtsy	26,205

== G ==
Group	Pop
Gagauzy	12,210
Gaij	4
Galga	7
Gantlyalo	1
Gvanal	3
Gibdidi	2
Gilyaki	22
Ginukhtsy	531
Godoberintsy	31
Golendry	3
Gollandtsy	334
Goldy	62
Gornye mariijtsy (Cheremiss)	18,510
Greki	97,740
Greki-romei	6
Greki-urumy	14
Greki-elliny	7
Grekos	1
Gruziny	196,923
Gunzal	9
Gunzibtsy	981
Gurbat	7
Gutsuly	108

== D ==
Group	Pop
Dagestanskie evrei (Jewish)	1,853
Dag-chufut	5
Dargan	106
Darganti	21
Dargintsy	509,934
Deijch	3
Deng	1
Derbety	7
Detkil	1
Dzhivut bukhari	2
Dzhugi	2
Dzhugut	3
Dzhufut	1
Dzhukhut	2
Digor	1
Digoron	8
Digortsy	562
Didoijtsy	14,750
Doijch	2
Dolgan	155
Dolgany	7,051
Dom	5
Donskie armyane (armene)	109
Dudki	3
Dulgan	12
Dungane	794
Derbety	9
Dyurbety	6

== E ==
Group	Pop
Jews	229,931
Evenki	35,527
Evrei (Jewish) gorskie	1,384
Georgian Jews	49
Crimean Jews	27
Central Asian Jews	11
Egyptians	173

== Y ==
Group	Pop
Yezdy	976
Yeizidy	29,300

== Z ==
Group	Pop
Zhagaijbaijly	4
Zhappas	1
Zhemaijty	1
Zabolotnye Tatar	1
Zatundrennye krestyane	8
Zyryane	1,866

== I ==
Group	Pop
Ibdidi	6
Ivri	6
Idari	1
Ideri	3
Idn	2
Iezidy	767
Izhemtsy	34
Izhora	48
Izhortsy	257
Izuri	11
Izvatas	1,867
Iliijtsy	6
Ilkan	2
Ile	1
Ingermanlandtsy	269
Ingiloij	37
Ingiloijtsy	26
Ingry	8
Ingushi	413,009
Indigirschiki	7
Indians	4,590
Inkerilaijnen	4
Inkhokvarintsy	9
Iordantsy	250
Iraktsy	33
Irantsy	2,989
Iron	9
Irontsy	34
Ispantsy	1,547
Israel	14
Italyantsy	862
Itelmeny	3,141
Itelmen	20

== Y ==
Group	Pop
Yazidis	160
Yemenis	110
Yykhvi	1

== K ==
Group	Pop
Kabardeij	3
Kabardintsy	519,932
Kabgan	7
Kazaki	140,292
Kazanly	6
Kazanskie Tatar	499
Kazakhi	653,599
Kaijtagtsy	5
Kalmaki	72
Kalmyki	173,872
Kalpak	6
Kamentsy	16
Kamenschiki	2
Kamchadaly	2,312
Kaninskie pomory	7
Kantaga yakh	3
Kapuchiny	4
Karagasy	21
Karagasy tomskie	32
Karagashi	18
Karagintsy	22
Karaimy	354
Karaij	12
Karakalpaki	1,587
Karanogaijtsy	5
Karan`ynylo	1
Qaratay	16
Karatintsy	6,042
Karachayevtsy	192,025
Karachaij	154
Karachaijlyla(karachaijly)	3
Karely	93,299
Karinskie(nukratskie) Tatar	26
Karolpak	16
Karpatorossy	2
Kartveli	1
Karymy	2
Karyala	13
Karyalaijzet	5
Karyalani	1
Karyalyaijn	3
Kasimov Tatar	29
Katartsy	7
Kachintsy	16
Kashgartsy	17
Kvanadlettsy	1
Kvannal	13
Kereij	12
Kereki	8
Kerzhaki	18
Keto	1,228
Kety	82
Kirgizy	31,064
Kirdi	10
Kitaijtsy	33,697
Kozhla mariij	74
Koijbaly	2
Kolymskie	15
Kolymchane	46
Komis	273,558
Komi voijtyr	32
Komi ijoz	146
Komi mort	280
Komi otir	12
Komi-zyryane	4,976
Komi-izhemtsy	13,706
Komi-permyaki	121,286
Koreijtsy	148,534
Koree saram	5
Koryaki	8,466
Kreschentsy	545
Kreschenye	763
Kreschenye Tatar	7,067
Krymskie armyane (armene)	54
Krymchaki	130
Kryasheny	16,293
Kuannal	8
Kubandy	3
Kubachintsy	85
Kuban Cossacks	707
Kuveijttsy	8
Kudaijrag	4
Kudartsy	32
Kumandintsy	3,097
Kumuk	150
Kumyki	422,259
Kurdaksko-sargatskie Tatar	2
Kurdy	19,606
Kurmandzh	1
Kuryk mariij	5
K'rym tatarlar	3
Kyzyl	2
Kyzyltsy	1
Kypchak	6
Kyrgyz	744
Kyuregu	4
Kyurintsy	1

== L ==
Group	Pop
Lazy	221
Lak	524
Laki	1,411
Lakkuchu	2
Laktsy	154,597
Lamut	448
Lamut-namatkan	3
Lao khuijkhuij	6
Lappi	6
Latvietis	10
Latvieshi	3
Latgalietis	12
Latgaltsy	1,610
Latyshi	26,885
Lezgi	149
Lezgins	411,365
Lezgiyar	4
Lemki	6
Lenskie starozhily	3
Lesnye mariijtsy (Cheremiss)	33
Letuvnik	5
Letuvyaij	3
Livantsy	607
Livvikeeij	11
Livviki	2
Livgilyaijne	2
Liviijtsy	50
Litvin	85
Litvyak	23
Litovtsy	45,478
Lopari	21
Lugovo-vostochnye mariij(Cheremiss)	3,333
Lugovye mariij(Cheremiss)	52,399
Luoravetlan	26
Lyg'oravetlyat	2
Lyudiki	1
Lyudinikat	6
Lyuli	152
Lyuyudikeij	1
Lyuyudilaijne	4

== M ==
Group	Pop
Maarulal	16
Mavritantsy	71
Mavry	22
Madyar	123
Maijmintsy	6
Malkartsy	8
Malk'arlyla(malk'arly)	2
Mamkhegi	1
Manguny	5
Manegry	27
Mansi	11,330
Mar	54
Margali	33
Maris	280,834
Mariij	7,736
Mariijtsy	241,022
Markovtsy	2
Marokkantsy	935
makedonskiy	325
Makhmegi	1
Makhmegovtsy	3
Megrely	193
Megebor	1
Mezentsy	19
Mennoniten	11
Mennonity	23
Mendsi	43
Mescheryaki	39
Mizher	4
Mingrely	207
Mishari	486
Misher	32
Moans	12
Mogadi	1
Moksha	1,902
Moldavane	172,196
Moldoven	122
Mongoly	2,501
Moravane	56
Mordva	490,398
Mordva-moksha	47,722
Mordva-erzya	77,523
Mordviny	115,051
Mordovtsy	103,854
Mugat	45
Multoni	1
Murchen	13
Mykh abdyr	4
Mene	1
Myukhadar	1

== N ==
Group	Pop
Na beijenin	4
Nagaijbaki	9,600
Naijman	2
Nanaij	26
Nanaijtsy	12,072
Nani	4
Nakhada	1
Nganasany	830
Ne	1
Negdy	4
Negidaltsy	553
Nemtsy (Germans in Russia)	597,165
Nemtsy-mennonity	5
Nenach	1
Nentsy	41,289
Neneij nenets	2
Neneijne	1
Neschang	1
Nibakh	9
Nivkhs	24
Nivkhgu	1
Nivkhs	5,105
Nikhondzin	1
Nogai krymskie	10
Nogaij	1,094
Nogaij-karagash	3
Nogaijtsy	89,575
Nokhchiij	6
Nugaij tatar	30
Nymylany	216
Nigvngun	1
Nya	3
Nyasikhagil	2

== O ==
Group	Pop
obskie starozhily	4
oven	6
ovon	4
odmort	9
odmurt	12
odul	21
ozbak	1
oijraty	80
olyk mariij	11
olyutortsy	6
omantsy	12
omoki	51
ore kumandy	6
oroch	293
orochell	3
orochel	3
orochen	190
orochs	433
orochisel	2
orum	16
osetiny	514,166
osetiny-digortsy	36
osetiny-irontsy	18
osmany	4
khantys	346

== P ==
Group	Pop
Palestintsy	337
Paraba	2
Pars	3
Patany	4
Pakhtuny	12
Permyaki	878
Persy	603
Poluvertsy	2
Polyaki	72,980
Polyatsi	21
Pomory	6,564
Pontios	2
Portugaltsy	87
Pokhodchane	5
Pushtuny	1,839
Pe-baij	3
Pyan khasova	6

== R ==
Group	Pop
Rom	12
Roma	4
Romei	3
Romeos	2
Romeyus	1
Romyn	3
Rum	4
Rumeij	3
Rumyny	5,305
Rusiny	87
Russkie	115,882,264
Russko-ustintsy	8
Rutuls	357
Rutuls	29,560
Rukhni	17
Rushantsy	7
Rushoni	3

== S ==
Group	Pop
Sami	1,863
Saamy	107
Sagaij	3
Sagaijtsy	6
Sartuly	8
Sasignan	5
Saudovtsy	6
Yakuts, Sakha	168,082
Svany	41
Selkups	4,080
Semeijskie	80
Serby	4,156
Seto	130
Setu	54
S?lkup	7
Sibir tatarlar	4
Sirenigmit	1
Siriijtsy	1,385
Slovaki	568
Soijoty	2,769
Stepskie kazakhi	17
Sudantsy	164
Suomalaijset	3
Suomi	5
Suraijya	5
Susse kum	18
Servy	1

== T ==
Group	Pop
Tabasarans	1,091
Tabasarans	52,190
Tabasarans	78,497
Tabyn	3
Tavgiijtsy	1
Tavoktarosh	1
Tadar	6
Tadar-kizhi	6
Tadzhiki	120,099
Tazy	271
Talyshs	2,545
Talyshon	3
Tama	24
Tapanta	2
Taranchi	1
Tarlik	1
Tarskie Tatar	91
Tat	2,557
Tatar	11,044
Tatary	5,505,997
Tatary krymskie	3,807
Tatary sibirskie	9,368
Tatskie evrei (Jewish)	142
Taty-azerbaijdzhantsy	27
Taty-iudaisty	7
Taulu	4
Tevrizskie Tatar	2
Telengity	2,398
Telesy	1
Teleuty	2,650
Teptyari	162
Teptyari-bashkiry	21
Teptyari-Tatar	25
Teryukhane	15
Tindaly	14
Tindii	2
Tindintsy	24
Tlibishintsy	5
Tlissintsy	2
Tobolik	1
Tobolskie Tatar	7
Todzhik	37
Todzhintsy	4
Tongus	6
Torgouty	1
Torguty	4
Torkara	2
Tofa	742
Tofalary	74
Trukhmeny	13
Tualag	3
Tualtsy	2
Tuba	105
Tubalary	1,460
Tuva	103
Tuvintsy	207,103
Tuvintsy-todzhintsy	4,429
Tuga	3
Tumal	7
Tungusy	238
Tunistsy	194
Turamintsy	5
Kazakhs	229
Turgekhal	1
Turki	92,147
Turki-batumtsy	10
Turki-meskhetintsy	3,257
Turki-osmany	12
Turki-sukhumtsy	4
Turkmeny	33,014
Tukha	6
Tyva	31,782
Tyva-kizhi	12
Tyubere kumandy	3
Tyumensko-tyurinskie Tatar	16
Tyurk	382

== U ==
Group	Pop
Uak	9
Ugbugan	3
Udi	29
Udiny	3,685
Udmort	44
Udmurts	636,795
Ude	34
Udegeijtsy	1,618
Udekhe	2
Udekheijtsy	8
Uzbeki	122,860
Uijgury	2,843
Uijlta	72
Ukmort	10
Ukraintsy	2,942,849
Ulta	42
Ulta(oroki)	37
Ulcha	222
Ulchi	2,696
Unazigmit	13
Unan`akh	1
Unangan	2
Urbugan	2
Urmeij	11
Urmort	3
Urtmort	5
Urum	13
Uti	7

== F ==
Group	Pop
Fars	,204
Finny	33,728
Finny-ingermanlandtsy	41
Frank	2
Frantsuzy	819

== Kh ==
Group	Pop
Khaas	5
Khaash	5
Khaij	12
Khakasy	75,568
Khaldei	17
Khalkha	88
Khalkha-mongoly	47
Khalkhastsy	20
Khalmg	3
Khamnigany	636
Khamsheny	11
Khamshetsy	1
Khangaijtsy	6
Khanguk saram	16
Khandeyary	1
Khande	5
Khanti	9
Khanty	28,613
Khantykh	5
Khante	13
Khan	874
Khanzhen	2
Khvanal	2
Khvarshal	5
Khvarshintsy	51
Khvarshiny	61
Khemshily	1,520
Khemshiny	10
Khinatby	1
Khindi	354
Khindustantsy	36
Khnovtsy	5
Khoijbal	5
Khoijty	8
Khongodory	1
Khorvaty	412
Khorintsy	2
Khuani	2
Khugni	4
Khuijtszu	1
Khunzalis	3
Khunzaly	4
Khununi	1
Khyzyl	2

== Ts ==
Group	Pop
Tsakhurs	10,365
Tsezy	440
Tsongoly	1
Tsuntintsy	66
Tsygane	182,744
Tsygane sredneaziatskie	278

== C ==
Group	Pop
Chaan	2
Chavash	454
Chavchuveny	1
Chavchyv	3
Chalkantsy	259
Chamalaly	8
Chamalintsy	4
Chaty	5
Chauchu	3
Chelkantsy	596
Cheremisy	18
Cherkesogai	6
Cherkesy	60,482
Chernogortsy	131
Chekhi	2,848
Chechentsy	1,360,027
Chechentsy-akkintsy	114
Chzhungo zhen	4
Choson saram	1
Chuvantsy	1,073
Chuvashi	1,636,634
Chud	21
Chukchi	15,735
Chulymskie Tatar	2
Chulymskie tyurki	7
Chulymtsy	615
Chumyl-kup	4
Chukhari	4
Chukhontsy	15

== Sh ==
Group	Pop
Shapsugi	3,231
Shvedy	295
Shelkup	3
Sheshkum	3
Shkipetary	1
Shor-kizhi	2
Shors	13,973
Shugnantsy	7
Shugni	2

== E ==
Group	Pop
Evyn	2
Ebraeli	4
Eben	1
Evenks	35,278
Eveny	18,469
Evon	4
Evyn	2
Even	34
Eves	1
Ezdy	70
Elety	3
Ellinos	4
Elkan deijnin	1
Entsy	232
Encho	1
Erzyans	6,869
Eskimosy	1,724
Estontsy	27,899
Estontsy-setu	11
Esty	2
Eteli	8
Eushtintsy	4

== Y ==
Group	Pop
Yugen	1
Yugi	18
Yukagiry	1,370
Yupagyt	1
Yupik	11
Yurtovskie Tatar	6
Yakuty	275,813
Yakutyane	46
Yamskie	9
Yapontsy	834
Yaskolbinskie Tatar	3
Yakholshu	1
Yakhudi	2
Yakhudoi makhali	1

== Miscellaneous ==
Group	Pop
others	40,551
Not Reported	1,460,751

== Merged table ==
Since the number of ethnic groups recorded was too high the table was modified merging similar ethnic groups. The below table was prepared after merging similar groups.

Group	Total	Male	Female	Urban	U.Male	U.Female	Rural	R.Male	R.Female
Total	145,166,731	67,605,133	77,561,598	106,429,049	49,149,510	57,279,539	38,737,682	18,455,623	20,282,059
Abaziny (abaza, ashkharua, ashkhartsy, tapanta)	37,942	18,468	19,474	16,283	7,777	8,506	21,659	10,691	10,968
Abkhazy (abzhuijtsy, apsua, bzybtsy)	11,366	6,242	5,124	9,883	5,411	4,472	1,483	831	652
Avartsy (avaral, maarulal)	814,473	403,610	410,863	298,315	153,220	145,095	516,158	250,390	265,768
Andiijtsy (andii, andal, gvanal, kvannal, kuannal)	21,808	10,559	11,249	2,426	1,196	1,230	19,382	9,363	10,019
Archintsy (archi, archib)	89	67	22	82	64	18	7	3	4
Akhvakhtsy (akhvalal, ashvatl, ashval')	6,376	3,050	3,326	71	38	33	6,305	3,012	3,293
Bagulaly (bagvalaly, bagvalintsy, bagulav, gantlyalo, kvanadlettsy, tlibishintsy, tlissintsy)	40	23	17	33	19	14	7	4	3
Bezhtintsy (kapuchiny, khvanal)	6,198	2,992	3,206	62	39	23	6,136	2,953	3,183
Botlikhs	16	9	7	11	6	5	5	3	2
Hinukhs	531	244	287	15	4	11	516	240	276
Godoberintsy (gibdidi, ibdidi)	39	25	14	34	21	13	5	4	1
Gunzibtsy (gunzal, nakhada, khunzalis, khunzaly)	998	495	503	25	16	9	973	479	494
Didoijtsy (tsezy, tsuntintsy)	15,256	7,490	7,766	1,640	850	790	13,616	6,640	6,976
Karatintsy (kirdi)	6,052	2,952	3,100	463	253	210	5,589	2,699	2,890
Tindaly (idari, ideri, tindii, tindintsy)	44	24	20	21	12	9	23	12	11
Khvarshiny (inkhokvarintsy, khvarshal, khvarshintsy, khuani)	128	70	58	11	7	4	117	63	54
Chamalaly (chamalintsy)	12	6	6	6	3	3	6	3	3
Aguly (agul shuij, agular, agultsy)	28,297	14,262	14,035	11,065	5,579	5,486	17,232	8,683	8,549
Adygeijtsy (abadzekhi, adyge with language adygeij, besleneevtsy with language adygeij, bzhedugi, mamkhegi, makhmegi, makhmegovtsy)	128,528	62,791	65,737	60,053	28,893	31,160	68,475	33,898	34,577
Azerbaijdzhantsy (azerbaijdzhanly, azerbaijdzhanlylar, Turk with language azerbaijdzhan)	621,840	386,776	235,064	479,517	307,346	172,171	142,323	79,430	62,893
Aleuty (angaginas, sasignan, unan`akh, unangan)	540	262	278	172	79	93	368	183	185
Altaijtsy (altaij-kizhi, kypchak with language altaij, maijmintsy, naijman with language altaij)	67,239	31,650	35,589	13,897	6,252	7,645	53,342	25,398	27,944
Americans	1,275	812	463	1,230	780	450	45	32	13
Anglichane	529	342	187	505	324	181	24	18	6
Araby (alzhirtsy, araby Ob'edinennykh Arabskikh Emiratov, araviijtsy, bakhreijntsy, egiptyane, iordantsy, iraktsy, ijementsy, katartsy, kuveijttsy, livantsy, liviijtsy, mavritantsy, marokkantsy, omantsy, palestintsy, saudovtsy, siriijtsy, sudantsy, tunistsy)	10,630	9,036	1,594	10,231	8,729	1,502	399	307	92
Araby sredneaziatskie (arabi)	181	103	78	137	87	50	44	16	28
Armyane (gaij, donskie armyane, krymskie armyane, frank, khaij, cherkesogai)	1,130,491	620,178	510,313	805,621	446,424	359,197	324,870	173,754	151,116
Assiriijtsy (aijsory, aramei, asori, assuraijya, aturaya, suraijya, khaldei)	13,649	6,868	6,781	10,573	5,249	5,324	3,076	1,619	1,457
Balkartsy (malkartsy, malk'arlyla, malk'arly, taulu)	108,426	52,199	56,227	51,565	24,470	27,095	56,861	27,729	29,132
Bashkirs (bashkort, bashkurt, kazaki with language bashkir, teptyari-bashkiry, teptyari with language bashkir)	1,673,389	793,184	880,205	794,411	371,028	423,383	878,978	422,156	456,822
Belorusy (belarusy, breschuki, litviny, litvyaki)	807,970	376,093	431,877	623,098	291,781	331,317	184,872	84,312	100,560
Besermyane (beshermyane)	3,122	1,545	1,577	766	366	400	2,356	1,179	1,177
Bolgary	31,965	17,281	14,684	25,362	13,935	11,427	6,603	3,346	3,257
Buryats (agintsy, baryaat, buryaad, kazaki with language buryat, sartuly, khamnigany, khongodory, khorintsy, tsongoly)	445,175	212,150	233,025	194,562	90,240	104,322	250,613	121,910	128,703
Vengry (madyar)	3,768	2,021	1,747	2,553	1,382	1,171	1,215	639	576
Vepsians (bepsya, vepsya, lyudinikat, lyuyudilaijne with language veps, chud, chukhari)	8,240	3,339	4,901	4,624	1,789	2,835	3,616	1,550	2,066
Vod (vadyakko)	73	34	39	56	26	30	17	8	9
Vetnamtsy (vet ngoij)	26,206	18,297	7,909	25,623	17,904	7,719	583	393	190
Gagauz	12,210	6,972	5,238	9,042	5,101	3,941	3,168	1,871	1,297
Greki (greki-romei, greki-elliny, grekos, pontios, romei, romeos, romeyus, rum, rumeij, ellinos)	97,827	49,615	48,212	61,550	31,071	30,479	36,277	18,544	17,733
Greki-urumy (orum, urmeij, urum)	54	34	20	40	25	15	14	9	5
Gruziny (kartveli)	197,934	123,062	74,872	166,877	103,665	63,212	31,057	19,397	11,660
Adzhartsy (adzhareli)	252	154	98	153	102	51	99	52	47
Ingiloijtsy (ingiloij)	63	35	28	57	33	24	6	2	4
Lazy	221	127	94	101	59	42	120	68	52
Megrely (margali, mingrely)	433	290	143	364	243	121	69	47	22
Svans	41	33	8	35	28	7	6	5	1
Dargwins (dargan, darganti, urbugan)	510,156	253,936	256,220	172,421	87,841	84,580	337,735	166,095	171,640
Kaijtagtsy	5	2	3	5	2	3	0	0	0
Kubachintsy (ugbugan)	88	50	38	87	50	37	1	0	1
Dolgany (dolgan, dulgan, sakha with language dolgan)	7,261	3,262	3,999	1,334	471	863	5,927	2,791	3,136
Dungane (lao khuijkhuij, khuijtszu)	801	448	353	415	242	173	386	206	180
Evrei (ashkenaz, idn)	229,938	118,365	111,573	224,672	115,427	109,245	5,266	2,938	2,328
Evrei gorskie (dagestanskie evrei, dag-chufut, dzhufut, dzhukhut, tatskie evrei, taty-iudaisty)	3,394	2,109	1,285	3,191	1,966	1,225	203	143	60
Evrei gruzinskie (ebraeli)	53	35	18	51	34	17	2	1	1
Evrei sredneaziatskie (bani isroil, bukharskie evrei, dzhivut bukhari, dzhugut, ivri, isroel, yakhudi, yakhudoi makhali)	54	32	22	49	28	21	5	4	1
Ezidy (ezdy, iezidy, ijezidy, ezdy)	31,273	16,646	14,627	19,120	10,227	8,893	12,153	6,419	5,734
Izhortsy (izhora, izuri, ingry, karyalyaijn)	327	109	218	177	76	101	150	33	117
Ingushs (galga)	413,016	198,115	214,901	186,478	91,497	94,981	226,538	106,618	119,920
Indiijtsy khindiyazychnye (khindi, khindustantsy)	4,980	4,264	716	4,939	4,233	706	41	31	10
Ispantsy	1,547	832	715	1,476	788	688	71	44	27
Italyantsy	862	526	336	819	503	316	43	23	20
Itelmeny (itelmen, kamchadaly with language itelmen)	3,180	1,465	1,715	1,194	505	689	1,986	960	1,026
Kabardintsy (adyge with language kabardin, kabardeij)	519,958	250,455	269,503	241,062	114,449	126,613	278,896	136,006	142,890
Kazakhi (adaij, argyn, bersh, zhagaijbaijly, zhappas, kereij, kypchak with language Kazakh, naijman with language Kazakh, nogaij with language Kazakh, stepskie kazakhi, tabyn, tama, torkara, turatinskie kazakhi, uak)	653,962	326,397	327,565	212,741	106,389	106,352	441,221	220,008	221,213
Kalmyki (bolshie derbety, derbety, derbety, dyurbety, kazaki with language kalmyt, oijraty, torgouty, torguty, khalmg, khoijty, elety)	173,996	84,413	89,583	85,600	40,100	45,500	88,396	44,313	44,083
Kamchadaly	2,293	1,114	1,179	1,297	601	696	996	513	483
Karaimy (karaij)	366	200	166	349	190	159	17	10	7
Karakalpaki (kalpak, karolpak)	1,609	900	709	1,081	592	489	528	308	220
Karachaevtsy (karachaij, karachaijlyla, karachaijly)	192,182	93,454	98,728	73,370	35,507	37,863	118,812	57,947	60,865
Karely (karyala, karyalaijzet, karyalani, lappi, livvikeeij, livviki, livgilyaijne, lyudiki, lyuyudikeeij, lyuyudilaijne with language karel)	93,344	39,871	53,473	52,205	21,350	30,855	41,139	18,521	22,618
Kereki	8	2	6	4	0	4	4	2	2
Kety (deng, keto, ostyaki with language ket)	1,494	712	782	406	155	251	1,088	557	531
Yugi (yugen)	19	10	9	14	7	7	5	3	2
Kirgizy (kyrgyz)	31,808	18,132	13,676	28,575	16,242	12,333	3,233	1,890	13,43
Chinese (khan, khanzhen, chzhungo zhen)	34,577	23,894	10,683	33,279	23,032	10,247	1,298	862	436
Komi (zyryane, komi voijtyr, komi-zyryane, komi ijoz, komi mort)	293,406	129,428	163,978	139,416	57,291	82,125	153,990	721,37	81,853
Komi-izhemtsy (izhemtsy, izvatas)	15,607	7,353	8,254	1,516	540	976	14,091	6,813	7278
Komi-permyaki (komi with language komi-permyat, komi mort with language komi-permyat, komi otir, permyaki)	125,235	55,977	69,258	48,658	20,269	28,389	76,577	35,708	40,869
Koreijtsy (koree saram, khanguk saram, choson saram)	148,556	75,835	72,721	119,260	59,916	59,344	29,296	15,919	13,377
Koryaks (alyutortsy, alutalu, apokvayamyl`o, apukintsy, voijkypal`o, voyampoltsy, kamentsy, karagintsy, karan`ynylo, nymylany, olyutortsy, chavchuveny, chavchyv)	8,743	4,191	4,552	2,765	1,225	1,540	5,978	2,966	3,012
Krymchaki (evrei krymskie)	157	96	61	145	90	55	12	6	6
Kuban Cossacks	707	557	150	655	518	137	52	39	13
Kumandintsy (kubandy, kumandy, oree kumandy, tadar-kizhi with language kumandin, tyubere kumandy)	3,114	1,413	1,701	1,704	756	948	1,410	657	753
Kumyki (kumuk)	422,409	205,632	216,777	198,807	96,486	102,321	223,602	109,146	114,456
Kurdy (kurmandzh)	19,607	10,520	9,087	4,505	2,742	1,763	15,102	7,778	7,324
Laktsy (vuluguni, vulegi, vulekko, lak, laki, lakkuchu, tumal, yakholshu)	156,545	75,397	81,148	109,750	52,831	56,919	46,795	22,566	24,229
Latyshi (latvietis, latvieshi)	28,520	13,518	15,002	20,660	9,810	10,850	7,860	3,708	4,152
Latgaltsy (latgalietis)	1,622	657	965	872	349	523	750	308	442
Lezgins (akhtintsy, kyuregu, kyurintsy, lezgi, lezgiyar)	411,535	208,546	202,989	192,577	99,144	93,433	218,958	109,402	109,556
Litovtsy (aukshtaijty, zhemaijty, letuvnik, letuvyaij, litviny with language litov, litvyaki with language litov)	45,569	24,392	21,177	31,279	16,801	14,478	14,290	7,591	6,699
Mansi (voguly, mendsi, moans, ostyaki with language mansiij)	11,432	5,167	6,265	5,919	2,562	3,357	5,513	2,605	2,908
Mari (mari, mari, mariij, cheremisy)	604,298	278,912	325,386	256,094	113,570	142,524	348,204	165,342	182,862
Gornye mariijtsy (kuryk mariij)	18,515	8,517	9,998	2,445	1,066	1,379	16,070	7,451	8,619
Lugovo-vostochnye mariijtsy (vetluzhskie mariijtsy, vostochnye (uralskie) mariijtsy, vutla mari, kozhla mariij, lesnye mariijtsy, lugovye mariijtsy, olyk mariij)	56,119	25,610	30,509	20,643	8,971	11,672	35,476	16,639	18,837
Moldavane (volokh, moldoven)	172,330	98,097	74,233	128,777	74,388	54,389	43,553	23,709	19,844
Mongoly (khalkha, khalkha-mongoly, khalkhastsy)	2,656	1,364	1,292	2,367	1,222	1,145	289	142	147
Mordva (Qaratay, mordviny, mordovtsy)	843,350	384,458	458,892	439,063	198,645	240,418	404,287	185,813	218,474
Mordva-moksha (moksha)	49,624	23,017	26,607	21,554	9,800	11,754	28,070	13,217	14,853
Mordva-erzya (teryukhane, erzya)	84,407	38,060	46,347	22,481	10,106	12,375	61,926	27,954	33,972
Nagaijbaki	9,600	4,391	5,209	1,889	830	1,059	7,711	3,561	4,150
Nanaijtsy (goldy, nanaij, nani with language nanaij)	12,160	5,636	6,524	3,702	1,619	2,083	8,458	4,017	4,441
Nganasany (nya, tavgiijtsy)	834	362	472	165	60	105	669	302	367
Negidaltsy (amgun beijenin, na beijenin, negdy, nyasikhagil, elkan deijnin)	567	249	318	164	69	95	403	180	223
Nemtsy (golendry, deijch, doijch, mennoniten, mennonity, nemtsy-mennonity)	597,212	290,115	307,097	339,288	164,015	175,273	257,924	126,100	131,824
Nentsy (ne, nenach, neneij nenets, neneijne, neschang, pyan khasova, khandeyary)	41,302	19,267	22,035	7,844	3,180	4,664	33,458	16,087	17,371
Nivkhs (gilyaki, nibakh, nivakh, nivukh, nivkhgu, nigvngun)	5,162	2,379	2,783	2,483	1,107	1,376	2,679	1,272	1,407
Nogais (karanogaijtsy, karagashi, nogaij-karagash, nogaij)	90,666	43,917	46,749	19,327	9,393	9,934	71,339	34,524	36,815
Orochs (nani with language oroch, oroch with language oroch, oroqen with language oroch, orochisel)	686	322	364	338	151	187	348	171	177
Osetiny (tualag, tualtsy)	514,875	249,874	265,001	332,629	160,107	172,522	182,246	89,767	92,479
Osetiny-digortsy (digor, digoron, digortsy)	607	297	310	321	154	167	286	143	143
Osetiny-irontsy (iron, irontsy, kudaijrag, kudartsy)	97	56	41	73	41	32	24	15	9
Persy (irantsy, mavry, pars, fars)	3,821	2,304	1,517	2,982	1,814	1,168	839	490	349
Polyaki (polyatsi)	73,001	31,761	41,240	56,050	24,022	32,028	16,951	7,739	9,212
Pushtuny (afgantsy, patany, pakhtuny)	9,800	8,245	1,555	9,544	8,042	1,502	256	203	53
Rumyny (romyn)	5,308	2,755	2,553	3,344	1,832	1,512	1,964	923	1,041
Rusyns (boijki, karpatorossy, lemki)	97	55	42	84	47	37	13	8	5
Russkie (zatundrennye krestyane, indigirschiki, kamenschiki, karymy, kerzhaki, kolymskie, kolymchane, lenskie starozhily, mezentsy, obskie starozhily, pokhodchane, russko-ustintsy, semeijskie, yamskie)	115,889,107	53,337,496	62,551,611	88,931,060	40,589,298	48,341,762	26,958,047	12,748,198	14,209,849
Kazakhs	140,028	76,720	63,308	63,987	35,619	28,368	76,041	41,101	34,940
Pomory (kaninskie pomory)	6,571	3,406	3,165	4,779	2,412	2,367	1,792	994	798
Rutultsy (megebor, mykh abdyr, myukhadar, rutul, khinatby, khnovtsy)	29,929	15,301	14,628	10,350	5,390	4,960	19,579	9,911	9,668
Saamy (lopari, saami)	1,991	882	1,109	853	332	521	1,138	550	588
Selkups (ostyaki with language selkup, seelkup, susse kum, chumyl-kup, shelkup, sheshkum)	4,249	2,028	2,221	786	353	433	3,463	1,675	1,788
Serby	4,156	3,163	993	3,777	2,939	838	379	224	155
Slovaki	568	332	236	481	284	197	87	48	39
Soijoty	2,769	1,392	1,377	252	112	140	2,517	1,280	1,237
Tabasarans (kabgan, tabasaran, tabasarantsy)	131,785	66,555	65,230	53,610	27,730	25,880	78,175	38,825	39,350
Tajiks (todzhik)	120,136	93,824	26,312	102,937	81,929	21,008	17,199	11,895	5,304
Tazy (ude with language kitaij ili rus)	276	131	145	110	53	57	166	78	88
Talyshs (talyshon)	2,548	1,766	782	2,397	1,661	736	151	105	46
Tatary (kazanly, kazanskie tatary, karinskie (nukratskie) tatary, kasimovskie tatary, mescheryaki, mishari, misher, tatar, teptyari with language tatar, teptyari-tatary)	5,554,601	2,605,039	2,949,562	3,795,319	1,759,613	2,035,706	1,759,282	845,426	913,856
Astrakhanskie tatary (alabugatskie tatary, yurtovskie tatary)	2,003	974	1,029	776	384	392	1,227	590	637
Kryasheny (kreschenye, kreschentsy, kreschenye tatary)	24,668	11,520	13,148	12,624	5,857	6,767	12,044	5,663	6,381
Tatary sibirskie (baraba, barabintsy, bokharly, bukhartsy, zabolotnye tatary, kalmaki, kurdaksko-sargatskie tatary, paraba, sibir tatarlar, tarlik, tarskie tatary, tevrizskie tatary, tobolik, tobolskie tatary, turamintsy, tyumensko-tyurinskie tatary, chaty, eushtintsy, yaskolbinskie tatary)	9,611	4,573	5,038	4,271	1,988	2,283	5,340	2,585	2,755
Tatary krymskie (k'rym tatarlar, nogai krymskie, nugaij tatar, tat with language krymskotatar)	4,131	2,112	2,019	2,217	1,136	1,081	1,914	976	938
Taty (tat, taty-azerbaijdzhantsy)	2,303	1,191	1,112	2,171	1,118	1,053	132	73	59
Telengity (telesy)	2,399	1,151	1,248	115	46	69	2,284	1,105	1,179
Teleuty (tadar-kizhi with language teleut)	2,650	1,210	1,440	1,142	529	613	1,508	681	827
Tofalary (karagasy, tofa)	837	421	416	138	73	65	699	348	351
Tubulary (tuba)	1,565	786	779	150	65	85	1,415	721	694
Tuvintsy (tuva, tyva, tyva-kizhi)	243,442	116,523	126,919	107,850	50,898	56,952	135,592	65,625	69,967
Tuvintsy-todzhintsy (todzhintsy, tuga, tukha)	4,442	2,154	2,288	7	4	3	4,435	2,150	2,285
Turki (osmany, turki-batumtsy, turki-osmany, turki-sukhumtsy, Turk with language turet)	92,415	49,680	42,735	18,217	12,062	6,155	74,198	37,618	36,580
Turki-meskhetintsy	3,257	1,772	1,485	1,529	835	694	1,728	937	791
Turkmeny (trukhmeny, Turk with language Turkmen)	33,053	18,944	14,109	14,695	9,350	5,345	18,358	9,594	8,764
Udiny (udi, uti)	3,721	1,943	1,778	2,078	1,114	964	1,643	829	814
Udmurts (votyaki, odmort, odmurt, udmort, ukmort, urmort, urtmort)	636,906	286,517	350,389	296,976	129,227	167,749	339,930	157,290	182,640
Udegeijtsy (ude, udekhe, udekheijtsy)	1,657	791	866	425	160	265	1,232	631	601
Uzbeki (ozbak, Turk with language uzbek)	122,916	80,745	42,171	98,548	65,182	33,366	24,368	15,563	8,805
Uijgury (iliijtsy or Ili Turki, kashgartsy, taranchi)	2,867	1,700	1,167	2,173	1,284	889	694	416	278
Ukraintsy (bukovintsy, verkhovintsy, gutsuly, kazaki with language ukrain)	2,942,961	1,410,164	1,532,797	2,251,198	1,088,279	1,162,919	691,763	321,885	369,878
Ulta (oroki) (oroch with language ulta, oroqen with language ulta, uijlta, ulta, ulcha with language ulta)	346	168	178	201	95	106	145	73	72
Ulchi (manguny, nani, ulcha with language ulch)	2,913	1,366	1,547	564	239	325	2,349	1,127	1,222
Finny (suomalaiset, suomi)	34,050	14,755	19,295	23,484	10,031	13,453	10,566	4,724	5,842
Finny-ingermanlandtsy (ingermanlandtsy, inkerilaijnen)	314	150	164	274	131	143	40	19	21
Frantsuzy	819	509	310	780	486	294	39	23	16
Khakasy (kachintsy, koijbaly, kyzyl, kyzyltsy, sagaij, sagaijtsy, tadar, tadar-kizhi with language khakas, khaas, khaash, khoijbal, khyzyl)	75,622	35,569	40,053	32,743	15,037	17,706	42,879	20,532	22,347
Khanty (kantaga yakh, ostyaki with language khantyij, khande, khanti, khantykh, khante)	28,678	13,033	15,645	9,924	4,152	5,772	18,754	8,881	9,873
Khemshily (khamsheny, khamshetsy, khemshiny)	1,542	802	740	115	68	47	1,427	734	693
Tsakhurs (ijykhby)	10,366	5,426	4,940	3,678	2,077	1,601	6,688	3,349	3,339
Tsygane (dom, rom, roma, servy)	182,766	89,366	93,400	113,852	55,368	58,484	68,914	33,998	34,916
Tsygane sredneaziatskie (gurbat, dzhugi, lyuli, mugat, multoni, tavoktarosh)	486	259	227	246	130	116	240	129	111
Chelkantsy (chalkantsy)	855	376	479	135	65	70	720	311	409
Cherkesy (adyge with language cherkes, besleneevtsy with language kabardino-cherkes, beslenei)	60,517	29,488	31,029	22,585	10,828	11,757	37,932	18,660	19,272
Chekhi (moravane)	2,904	1,390	1,514	2,060	977	1,083	844	413	431
Chechentsy (nokhchiij, chaan)	1,360,253	649,801	710,452	502,362	239,881	262,481	857,891	409,920	447,971
Chechentsy-akkintsy (akkintsy, aukhovtsy)	218	125	93	80	54	26	138	71	67
Chuvantsy (atali, markovtsy, eteli)	1,087	483	604	366	146	220	721	337	384
Chuvashi (viryal, mizher, chavash)	1,637,094	761,472	875,622	839,848	384,208	455,640	797,246	377,264	419,982
Chukchi (ankalyn, ankalyn, luoravetlan, lyg'oravetlyat, chauchu)	15,767	7,443	8,324	3,402	1,508	1,894	12,365	5,935	6,430
Chulymtsy (karagasy tomskie, chulymskie tatary, chulymskie turki)	656	318	338	54	29	25	602	289	313
Shapsugi	3,231	1,626	1,605	810	417	393	2,421	1,209	1,212
Shortsy (tadar-kizhi with language shor, shor-kizhi)	13,975	6,455	7,520	9,939	4,524	5,415	4,036	1,931	2,105
Evenks (ile, manegry, murchen, oroqen with language evenkiij, tongus, tungusy with language evenkiij)	35,527	17,005	18,522	8,576	3,862	4,714	26,951	13,143	13,808
Evens (ilkan, lamut, lamut-namatkan, mene, oven, ovon, oroch with language even, orocheel, orochel, oroqen with language even, tungusy with language even, turgekhal, yvyn, eben, evon, evyn, even, eves)	19,071	8,059	11,012	6,116	2,224	3,892	12,955	5,835	7,120
Entsy (mogadi, pe-baij, encho)	237	122	115	51	23	28	186	99	87
Eosy or Yupik(sirenigmit, unazigmit, yupagyt, yupit)	1,750	835	915	557	237	320	1,193	598	595
Estontsy (chukhontsy, esty)	28,113	12,481	15,632	18,082	7,869	10,213	10,031	4,612	5,419
Estontsy-setu (poluvertsy, seto, setu)	197	106	91	55	26	29	142	80	62
Yukagiry (alai, vadu, detkil, dudki, odul, omoki, khangaijtsy)	1,509	722	787	685	328	357	824	394	430
Yakuts (sakha)	443,852	212,911	230,941	157,825	72,107	85,718	286,027	140,804	145,223
Yapontsy (nikhondzin)	835	399	436	768	363	405	67	36	31
Others	42,980	27,185	15,795	36,169	23,293	12,876	6,811	3,892	2,919
NA	1,460,751	709,738	751,013	1,425,408	691,979	733,429	35,343	17,759	17,584

== See also ==
- Ethnic groups in Russia
- Demographics of Russia
- Ethnic groups of Siberia
- First All Union Census of the Soviet Union
