= Karymsky =

Karymsky (masculine), Karymskaya (feminine), or Karymskoye (neuter) may refer to:

- Karymsky (volcano), a volcano on the Kamchatka Peninsula, Russia
- Karymsky Lake, a lake on the Kamchatka Peninsula, Russia
- Karymsky District, a district of Zabaykalsky Krai, Russia
- Karymskoye, an urban-type settlement in Karymsky District of Zabaykalsky Krai, Russia
- Karymskaya, a rural locality (a village) in Krasnoyarsk Krai, Russia
