= Urulga =

Urulga Урульга
- Selo
- Location within Zabaykalsky Krai Location within Russia
- Coordinates: 51°46′N 114°48′E
- Country: Russia
- Region: Zabaykalsky Krai
- District: Karymsky District
- Time zone: UTC+9:00

Urulga (Russian: Урульга) is a rural locality (a selo) in Karymsky District, Zabaykalsky Krai, Russia. Population: 3,535 (2021 census); 3,150 (2010 census); 3,247 (2002 census); There are 32 streets in this selo.

== Geography ==
This rural locality is located 36 km from Karymskoye (the district's administrative centre), 95 km from Chita (capital of Zabaykalsky Krai) and 5,330 km from Moscow. Poselye is the nearest rural locality.
