= Ust-Natsigun =

Ust-Natsigun Усть-Нацигун
- Selo
- Location within Zabaykalsky Krai Location within Russia
- Coordinates: 51°40′N 114°41′E
- Country: Russia
- Region: Zabaykalsky Krai
- District: Karymsky District
- Time zone: UTC+9:00

Ust-Natsigun (Russian: Усть-Нацигун) is a rural locality (a selo) in Karymsky District, Zabaykalsky Krai, Russia. Population: 35 (2021 census); 45 (2010 census); 45 (2002 census); There are 2 streets in this selo.

== Geography ==
This rural locality is located 25 km from Karymskoye (the district's administrative centre), 91 km from Chita (capital of Zabaykalsky Krai) and 5,334 km from Moscow. Poselye is the nearest rural locality.
