= Srednyaya Talacha =

Srednyaya Talacha Средняя Талача
- Selo
- Location within Zabaykalsky Krai Location within Russia
- Coordinates: 51°50′N 114°55′E
- Country: Russia
- Region: Zabaykalsky Krai
- District: Karymsky District
- Time zone: UTC+9:00

Srednyaya Talacha (Russian: Средняя Талача) is a rural locality (a selo) in Karymsky District, Zabaykalsky Krai, Russia. Population: 156 (2021 census); 178 (2010 census); 18 (2002 census); There are 3 streets in this selo.

== Geography ==
This rural locality is located 46 km from Karymskoye (the district's administrative centre), 100 km from Chita (capital of Zabaykalsky Krai) and 5,329 km from Moscow. Naryn-Talacha is the nearest rural locality.
