= Novodoroninsk =

Novodoroninsk Новодоронинск
- Selo
- Location within Zabaykalsky Krai Location within Russia
- Coordinates: 51°32′N 113°51′E
- Country: Russia
- Region: Zabaykalsky Krai
- District: Karymsky District
- Time zone: UTC+9:00

Novodoroninsk (Russian: Новодоронинск) is a rural locality (a selo) in Karymsky District, Zabaykalsky Krai, Russia. Population: 347 (2021 census); 451 (2010 census); There are 8 streets in this selo.

== Geography ==
This rural locality is located 34 km from Karymskoye (the district's administrative centre), 61 km from Chita (capital of Zabaykalsky Krai) and 5,295 km from Moscow. Zhimbira is the nearest rural locality.
