= Mayaki =

Mayaki Маяки
- Selo
- Location within Zabaykalsky Krai Location within Russia
- Coordinates: 51°28′N 114°19′E
- Country: Russia
- Region: Zabaykalsky Krai
- District: Karymsky District
- Time zone: UTC+9:00

Mayaki (Russian: Маяки) is a rural locality (a selo) in Karymsky District, Zabaykalsky Krai, Russia. Population: 284 (2021 census); 285 (2010 census); 330 (2002 census); There are 3 streets in this selo.

== Geography ==
This rural locality is located 16 km from Karymskoye (the district's administrative centre), 84 km from Chita (capital of Zabaykalsky Krai) and 5,334 km from Moscow. Zubkovshchina is the nearest rural locality.
