= Kalanga, Zabaykalsky Krai =

Kalanga Каланга
- Selo
- Location within Zabaykalsky Krai Location within Russia
- Coordinates: 51°07′N 113°40′E
- Country: Russia
- Region: Zabaykalsky Krai
- District: Karymsky District
- Time zone: UTC+9:00

Kalanga (Russian: Каланга) is a rural locality (a selo) in Karymsky District, Zabaykalsky Krai, Russia. Population: 66 (2010 census); 122 (2002 census); There are 3 streets in this selo.

== Geography ==
This rural locality is located 73 km from Karymskoye (the district's administrative centre), 103 km from Chita (capital of Zabaykalsky Krai) and 5,333 km from Moscow. Balzino is the nearest rural locality.
