= Kadakhta =

Kadakhta Кадахта
- Selo
- Location within Zabaykalsky Krai Location within Russia
- Coordinates: 51°36′N 114°15′E
- Country: Russia
- Region: Zabaykalsky Krai
- District: Karymsky District
- Time zone: UTC+9:00

Kadakhta (Russian: Кадахта) is a rural locality (a selo) in Karymsky District, Zabaykalsky Krai, Russia. Population: 1,041 (2021 census); 1,020 (2010 census); 853 (2002 census); There are 8 streets in this selo.

== Geography ==
This rural locality is located 6 km from Karymskoye (the district's administrative centre), 70 km from Chita (capital of Zabaykalsky Krai) and 5,311 km from Moscow. Karymskoye is the nearest rural locality.
