= Archi =

Archi may refer to:

== Places ==
Afghanistan

- Dasht-e-Archi District, Kunduz Province

Iran

- Archi, Iran, in Mazandaran Province

Italy

- Archi, Abruzzo, a comune in the Province of Chieti

Palestinian territories

- Archi (Old Testament), an Old Testament city near Bethel in Ramallah and al-Bireh Governorate

Russia

- Archib, also known as Archi, a village in Charodinsky District, Dagestan

== Religion ==
- Archi (Hindu goddess), one of avatars of goddess Lakshmi
- Archi, the first light ray of sun that falls in the morning.

== People and languages ==
- Archi people, an ethnic group in Dagestan, Russia
- The Archi language, a Northeast Caucasian language spoken by the Archi people

== Science and technology ==
- Archi (software), an Enterprise Architecture modelling tool
- List of commonly used taxonomic affixes (for the prefix "archi-")
