= Kaydalovo =

Kaydalovo Кайдалово
- Selo
- Location within Zabaykalsky Krai Location within Russia
- Coordinates: 51°37′N 114°34′E
- Country: Russia
- Region: Zabaykalsky Krai
- District: Karymsky District
- Time zone: UTC+9:00

Kaydalovo (Russian: Кайдалово) is a rural locality (a selo) in Karymsky District, Zabaykalsky Krai, Russia. Population: 648 (2021 census); 872 (2010 census); 786 (2002 census); There are 10 streets in this selo.

== Geography ==
This rural locality is located 16 km from Karymskoye (the district's administrative centre), 86 km from Chita (capital of Zabaykalsky Krai) and 5,331 km from Moscow. Adrianovka is the nearest rural locality.
