= Tygertuy =

Tygertuy Тыргетуй
- Selo
- Location within Zabaykalsky Krai Location within Russia
- Coordinates: 51°26′N 113°47′E
- Country: Russia
- Region: Zabaykalsky Krai
- District: Karymsky District
- Time zone: UTC+9:00

Tygertuy (Russian: Тыргетуй) is a rural locality (a selo) in Karymsky District, Zabaykalsky Krai, Russia. Population: 1,004 (2021 census); 1,032 (2010 census); 829 (2002 census); There are 13 streets in this selo.

== Geography ==
This rural locality is located 43 km from Karymskoye (the district's administrative centre), 68 km from Chita (capital of Zabaykalsky Krai) and 5,301 km from Moscow. Shara-Gorkhon is the nearest rural locality.
