= Naryn-Talacha =

Naryn-Talacha Нарын-Талача
- Selo
- Location within Zabaykalsky Krai Location within Russia
- Coordinates: 51°55′N 114°51′E
- Country: Russia
- Region: Zabaykalsky Krai
- District: Karymsky District
- Time zone: UTC+9:00

Naryn-Talacha (Russian: Нарын-Талача) is a rural locality (a selo) in Karymsky District, Zabaykalsky Krai, Russia. Population: 617 (2021 census); 679 (2010 census); 650 (2002 census); There are 11 streets in this selo.

== Geography ==
This rural locality is located 49 km from Karymskoye (the district's administrative centre), 94 km from Chita (capital of Zabaykalsky Krai) and 5,314 km from Moscow. Verkhnyaya Talacha is the nearest rural locality.
