= Zubkovshchina =

Zubkovshchina Зубковщина
- Selo
- Location within Zabaykalsky Krai Location within Russia
- Coordinates: 51°30′N 114°23′E
- Country: Russia
- Region: Zabaykalsky Krai
- District: Karymsky District
- Time zone: UTC+9:00

Zubkovshchina (Russian: Зубковщина) is a rural locality (a selo) in Karymsky District, Zabaykalsky Krai, Russia. Population: 69 (2021 census); 78 (2010 census); 119 (2002 census); There is 1 street in this selo.

== Geography ==
This rural locality is located 14 km from Karymskoye (the district's administrative centre), 86 km from Chita (capital of Zabaykalsky Krai) and 5,336 km from Moscow. Mayaki is the nearest rural locality.
