= Akademia Nauk =

Volcano located on the southern part of the Kamchatka peninsula

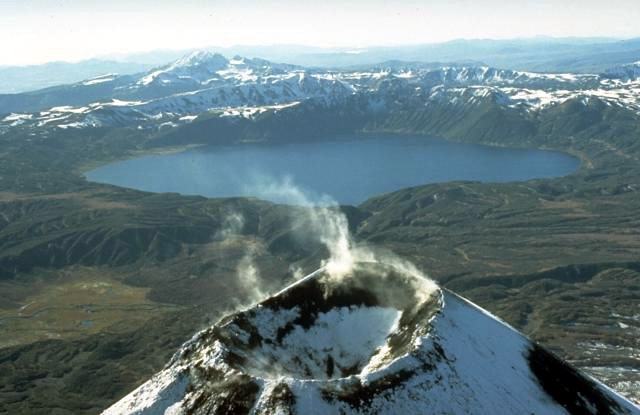
- The scenic lake-filled Akademia Nauk caldera, seen here from the north with Karymsky volcano in the foreground.

Highest point
- Elevation: 1,180 m (3,870 ft)
- Listing: Volcanoes of Russia
- Coordinates: 53°59′1″N 159°27′40″E

Geography
- Location within Kamchatka Krai
- Location: Kamchatka, Russia
- Parent range: Eastern Range

Geology
- Rock age: Holocene
- Mountain type: Caldera / Stratovolcanoes
- Last eruption: January 2–3, 1996

Akademia Nauk (Russian: Академия Наук - Academy of Sciences) is a volcano located in the southern part of Kamchatka Peninsula, Russia, next to the stratovolcano of Karymsky. The volcano is filled with a few calderas, and the most notable one is known as Karymsky Lake (named after Karyms).

The volcano is named after the Росси́йская Акаде́мия Нау́к, the Russian (Soviet) Academy of Sciences. Its only recorded historical eruption occurred on January 2–3, 1996. Karymsky was also erupting during the same time, which continued into April 1996.

== 1996 eruption ==
On 2 January 1996, Akademia Nauk erupted. Eruptive pulses from the bottom of Karymsky Lake ejected steam and ash columns in the air every five to six hours for the 18 hours that followed, releasing approximately 30 to 40 million tons of highly acidic pyroclastic material in the air, tsunamis up to 20 meters (65 feet) also occurred. Much of the material, which was rich in sodium, sulfates, calcium, and magnesium, collapsed back into Lake Karymsky, changing its pH from 7.5 to 3.2 (moderately acidic).
