= Russian old-settlers =

Russian subethnic groups

The old‑settlers (Russian: старожилы, romanized: starozhily) are the Russian settlers of the Russian North (the Pomors), the Urals, Siberia (the Siberians), the Russian Far East (the Kamchadals), and the former Russian America (under the name 'Russian Creoles') from the 11th to the 18th centuries, and their descendants. Among them, interethnic marriages, borrowing words from local languages, and adopting the culture of Indigenous peoples were practised.

A principal part of them were Old Believers, at least prior to the rise of the Soviet Union.

== Subgroups ==
- Alaskan Creoles – Creoles of Russian, Siberian, Eskimo, Aleut, and other Alaska Native ancestry.
- Chaldons – Creoles of Russians and native Siberians.
- Kamchadals – descendants of the native Kamchatkan peoples who assimilated with the Russians.
- Kamenschiks – Old Believers in Southern Siberia.
- Karyms and Gurans – métis resulting from mixing Russians with Buryats and Evenks in Buryatia and Transbaikalia.
- Markovtsy – métis resulting from mixing Russians and Chuvans in Chukotka.
- Pokhodchane or Kolymans – Russians in Arctic Sakha.
- Russkoust'intsy or Indigirschiks – métis resulting from mixing Russians with Yukaghirs, Sakha, and Evens in Arctic Sakha.
- Tundra Peasants – métis resulting from mixing Russians with Evenks and Sakha on the Taymyr.
- Yakutians or Lena Peasants – métis resulting from mixing Russians with Sakha.
