= Verkhnyaya Talacha =

Verkhnyaya Talacha Верхняя Талача
- Selo
- Location within Zabaykalsky Krai Location within Russia
- Coordinates: 51°55′N 115°00′E
- Country: Russia
- Region: Zabaykalsky Krai
- District: Karymsky District
- Time zone: UTC+9:00

Verkhnyaya Talacha (Russian: Верхняя Талача) is a rural locality (a selo) in Karymsky District, Zabaykalsky Krai, Russia. Population: 237 (2021 census); 274 (2010 census); 337 (2002 census); There are 5 streets in this selo.

== Geography ==
This rural locality is located 57 km from Karymskoye (the district's administrative centre), 104 km from Chita (capital of Zabaykalsky Krai) and 5,323 km from Moscow. Naryn-Talacha is the nearest rural locality.
