= Zhimbira =

Zhimbira Жимбира
- Selo
- Location within Zabaykalsky Krai Location within Russia
- Coordinates: 51°31′N 114°00′E
- Country: Russia
- Region: Zabaykalsky Krai
- District: Karymsky District
- Time zone: UTC+9:00

Zhimbira (Russian: Жимбира) is a rural locality (a selo) in Karymsky District, Zabaykalsky Krai, Russia. Population: 396 (2021 census); 457 (2010 census); 452 (2002 census); There are 5 streets in this selo.

== Geography ==
This rural locality is located 26 km from Karymskoye (the district's administrative centre), 68 km from Chita (capital of Zabaykalsky Krai) and 5,307 km from Moscow. Novodoroninsk is the nearest rural locality.
