= Poselye, Zabaykalsky Krai =

Poselye Поселье
- Selo
- Location within Zabaykalsky Krai Location within Russia
- Coordinates: 51°42′N 114°44′E
- Country: Russia
- Region: Zabaykalsky Krai
- District: Karymsky District
- Time zone: UTC+9:00

Poselye (Russian: Поселье) is a rural locality (a selo) in Karymsky District, Zabaykalsky Krai, Russia. Population: 360 (2021 census); 311 (2010 census); 374 (2002 census); There are 5 streets in this selo.

== Geography ==
This rural locality is located 30 km from Karymskoye (the district's administrative centre), 93 km from Chita (capital of Zabaykalsky Krai) and 5,333 km from Moscow. Ust-Natsigun is the nearest rural locality.
