= Maksud Sadikov =

Russian academic (1963–2011)

Maksud Ibnugadzharovich Sadikov
- Born: Садиков Максуд Ибнугаджарович; 16 March 1963; Archib, Dagestan
- Died: 7 June 2011 (aged 48); Makhachkala, Dagestan
- Citizenship: Russia, Dagestan
- Occupation: Rector
- Known for: Rector, Institute of Theology & International Relations
- Awards: Order of Courage
- Website: http://www.itimo.ru

Maksud Ibnugadzharovich Sadikov (Russian: Максуд Ибнугаджарович Садиков; 16 March 1963 – 7 June 2011) was a professor in international relations and Islamic economics, a practicing Sufi, and follower of Shaykh Said Afandi al-Chirkawi.

== Biography ==
He was born in the village of Archib, Charodinsky District, republic of Dagestan. Islamic scholar, Muslim intellectual, Rector of Institute of Theology and International Relations, Makhachkala, Dagestan. He was assassinated in Makhachkala, and buried in Archib, Dagestan. On 5 July 2011 Russia's President Dmitry Medvedev posthumously awarded Maksud Sadikov with Order of Courage in a meeting with North Caucasus Muftis and religious leaders in Vladikavkaz. In a gathering held in memory of Maksud Sadikov in Makhachkala, it was decided to organize 6 October as annual Maksud Sadikov commemoration day.

== Education ==
- 1981–1986: Moscow Temiryazev Agricultural Academy (MTAA).
- 1987–1990: Master of Economics and Management, MTAA.
- 1994–1996: PhD in government administration from Moscow State Lomonosov University.
- 1998–2000: Public Administration Academy of Russian Federation.
- 2003–2004: Open Ecological University of MSU.

== Work experience ==
- 1986–1987: Researcher, Moscow Temiryazev Agricultural Academy.
- 1991–1997: Senior Researcher, School of Public Administration, MTAA.
- 1997–1999: Director, Ministry of National Policy of Russian Federation.
- 1999–2000: Adviser, Ministry of Nationalities and Federation Affairs of RF.
- 2000–2002: Adviser, Ministry of Federation Affairs, National and Migrational Policies, RF.
- 2001–2003: President, MamaDibir Rochi Theological Humanitarian Academy
- 2003–2011: Rector, Institute of Theology and International Relations, Makhachkala.
