= Shiveluch =

Large active stratovolcano on the Kamchatka peninsula, Russia

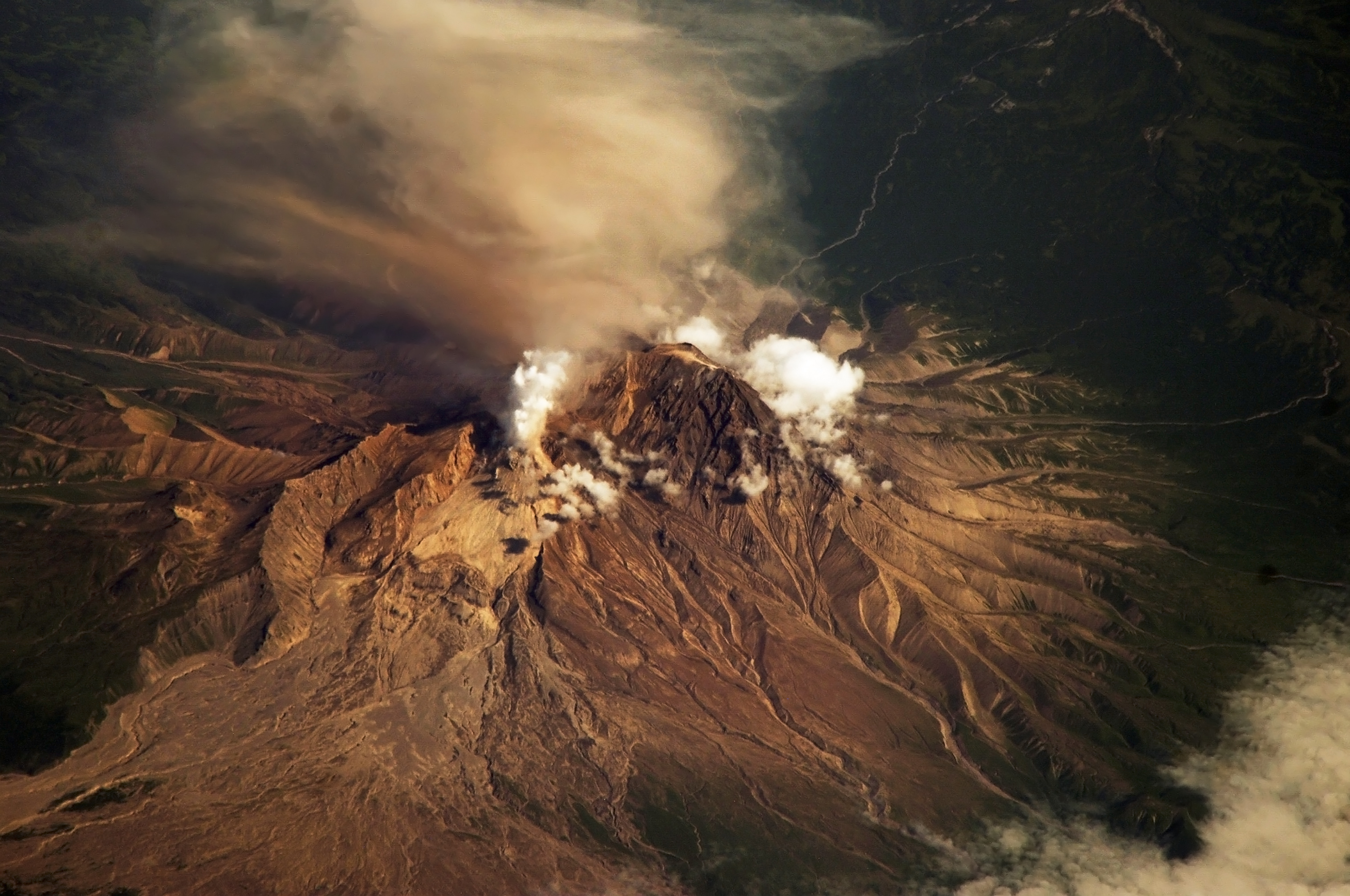
- Shiveluch from space (July 2007)

Highest point
- Elevation: 3,307 m (10,850 ft)
- Prominence: 3,168 m (10,394 ft); Ranked 73rd
- Listing: Ultra
- Coordinates: 56°39′12″N 161°21′42″E

Geography
- Location within Far Eastern Federal District
- Location: Kamchatka, Russia
- Parent range: Eastern Range

Geology
- Rock age: Late Pleistocene
- Mountain type: Stratovolcano (active)
- Last eruption: 24 May 2026 (ongoing as of 27 May 2026)

Climbing
- Easiest route: basic rock/snow climb

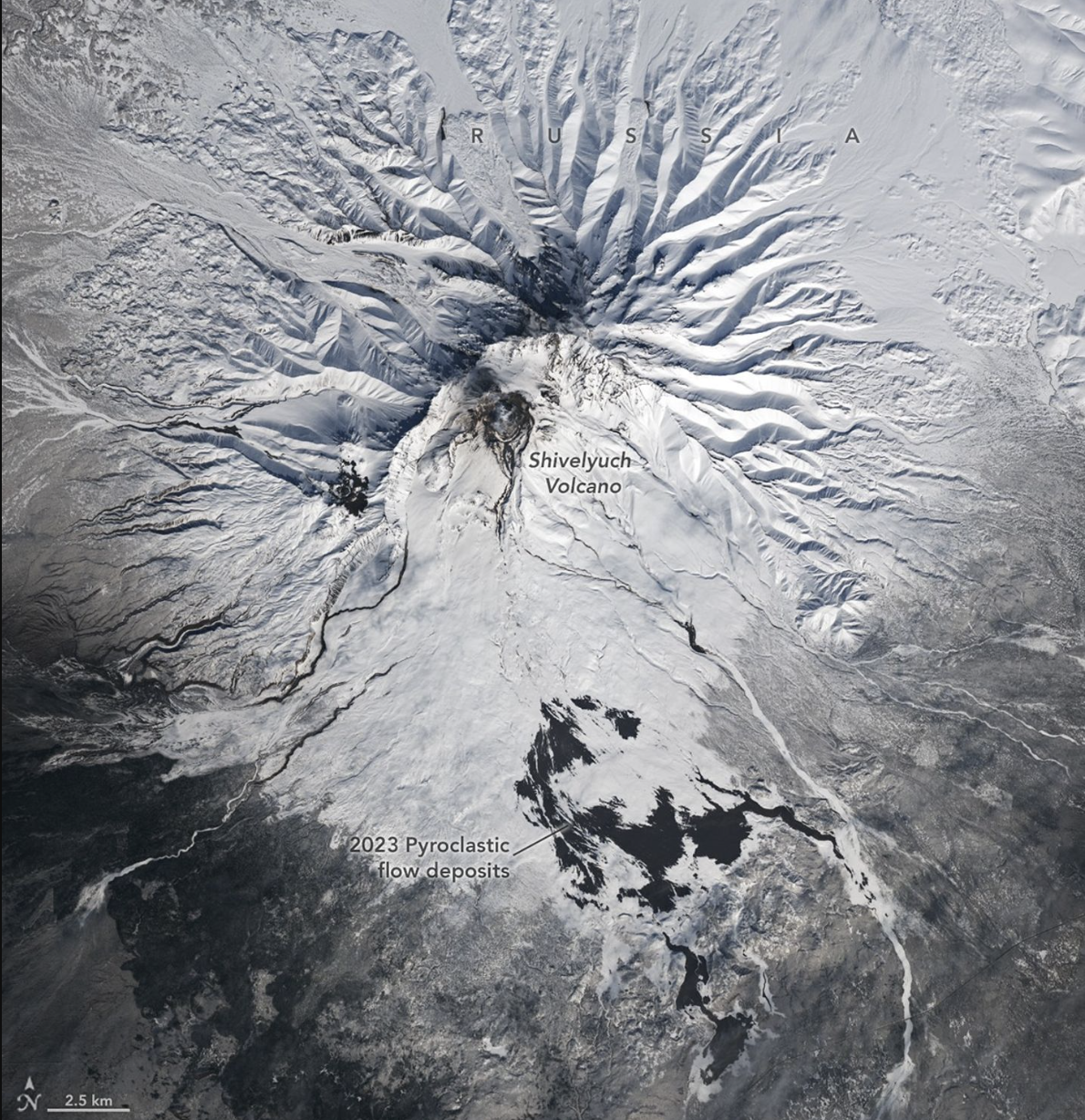
Snow has melted from warm volcanic deposits of ash and rock on the flanks of Shivelyuch [sic] on April 23, 2026. Image captured by the OLI (Operational Land Imager) on Landsat 9.

Shiveluch (Russian: Шивелуч, IPA: [ʂɨˈvʲeɫʊt͡ɕ]), also called Sheveluch, (Note: Other spellings include Russian: Шевелюч, Shevelyuch and Shivelyuch) which originates from the name "suelich" which means "smoking mountain" in Itelmen, is the northernmost active volcano in Kamchatka Krai, Russia. It and Karymsky are Kamchatka's largest, most active and most continuously erupting volcanoes, as well as one of the most active on the planet. Shiveluch erupts around 0.015 km^{3} (0.0036 mi^{3}) of magma per year, which causes frequent and large hot avalanches and lava dome formations at the summit. Volcanic ash emissions from this volcano often disrupt air traffic connecting the Asian and North American continents.

== Geography ==
Shiveluch belongs to the Kliuchevskaya volcano group, located in central Kamchatka 84 kilometers (52 mi) northwest of Ust-Kamchatsk. The nearest settlement from the volcano is Klyuchi, situated 50 km (31 mi) from the mountain. The settlement is small enough to evacuate rapidly in case of a major eruption.

== Geologic setting ==
Shiveluch is a volcano within the Kuril–Kamchatka volcanic arc which hosts tens of other volcanoes. As the Pacific Plate crust subducts deeper under the Okhotsk Plate, the melting points of minerals underground are reduced by other materials including water which results in the materials melting and forming into magma which rises onto the surface and forms the volcanoes.

=== Structure ===
There are three elements of the volcano: the stratovolcano Old Shiveluch (Старый Шивелуч); an ancient caldera; and the active Young Shiveluch (Молодой Шивелуч), with an elevation of about 2,800 meters (9,200 ft). Shiveluch is one of Kamchatka's largest and most active volcanic structures. It is a stratovolcano composed of alternating layers of solidified ash, hardened lava and volcanic rocks.

=== Geologic history ===
Shiveluch began forming about 60,000 to 70,000 years ago during the Late Pleistocene, and it has had at least 60 large eruptions during the Holocene. During this era, the most intense period of volcanism — including frequent large and moderate eruptions — occurred around 6500–6400 BC, 2250–2000 BC, and AD 50–650. This coincides with the peak of activity in other Kamchatka volcanoes. The current active period started around 900 BC. Since then, the large and moderate eruptions have been following each other at 50-to-400-year-long intervals. Chemically a full spectrum of subduction-zone lava types occur: basalt, mafic andesite, two-pyroxene andesite, hornblende-hypersthene andesite, hornblende andesite, hornblende dacite, rhyolite.

== Modern activity ==
Catastrophic eruptions took place in 1854 and 1964, when a large part of the lava dome collapsed and created a devastating debris avalanche.

The most recent period of volcanic activity began with the eruption of Young Shiveluch on 15 August 1999, and continues as of 2025. On 27 February 2015, Shiveluch erupted shooting ash into the atmosphere about 9,100 meters (30,000 ft) crossing the Bering Sea and into Alaska.

=== April 2023 eruption ===
Since mid-2022, volcanologists were expecting an imminent large eruption of Shiveluch due to the unstable state of its lava dome. A strong eruption occurred on 11 April 2023 at 00.54 local time. A progressive increase in activity was observed since 28 March in the form of continued extrusion, fumarole activity, and ash emissions. During the initial paroxysmal explosive phase on 11 April, the volcano ejected a cloud of volcanic gas and ash that reached a height of 20 km (12 mi) and spread over an area of 108,000 km^{2} (42,000 sq mi). Pyroclastic flows from the eruption traveled up to 19 km (12 mi) away from the volcano. The next day, other summit explosions followed, the eruption column of one of which reached an altitude of 10 km (6.2 mi). The initial phase resulted in the region's largest ashfall in 60 years. The Federal Air Transport Agency assigned the eruption a “red” (maximum) hazard code. Because the height of the eruption columns reached the stratosphere, 200,000 tons of sulfur dioxide were released into the upper atmosphere. According to authorities, this eruption, with the exception of heavy ashfall, did not lead to any damage to local settlements and transport infrastructure.

Analysis of radar images from satellites on 15 April showed that the main eruption occurred as a result of the collapse of the lava dome of the volcano to the south, with the formation of a 2 km × 2.6 km (1.2 mi × 1.6 mi) collapse scar in its place. Initially, the collapse process was triggered by a breach of the dome at its base and by the subsequent lateral explosion to the southeast. Thus, the eruption classifies as Peléan. Since 12 April, the activity of the volcano decreased, but the eruption continued in the form of ash ejections of lower intensity and height, and strong fumarole activity continued. Infra-red satellite images on 16 April showed that the volcano is forming a new lava dome inside its new crater.

=== Post 2023 eruptions ===
On 18 August 2024 an eruption of Shiveluch occurred following a magnitude 7.0 earthquake off the coast of Kamchatka Krai, sending an ash cloud 8 kilometres (5 mi) high, and with a length of 490 kilometres (304 mi) heading east and southeast. A "code red" warning was issued for aircraft in the area.

Another eruption happened on November 7, 2024 evening. In the morning the volcano was quiet, there were no damages, and the level of volcanic ash settled in populated areas was less than 1mm. After that the volcano was quiet until May 2025.

== Gallery ==
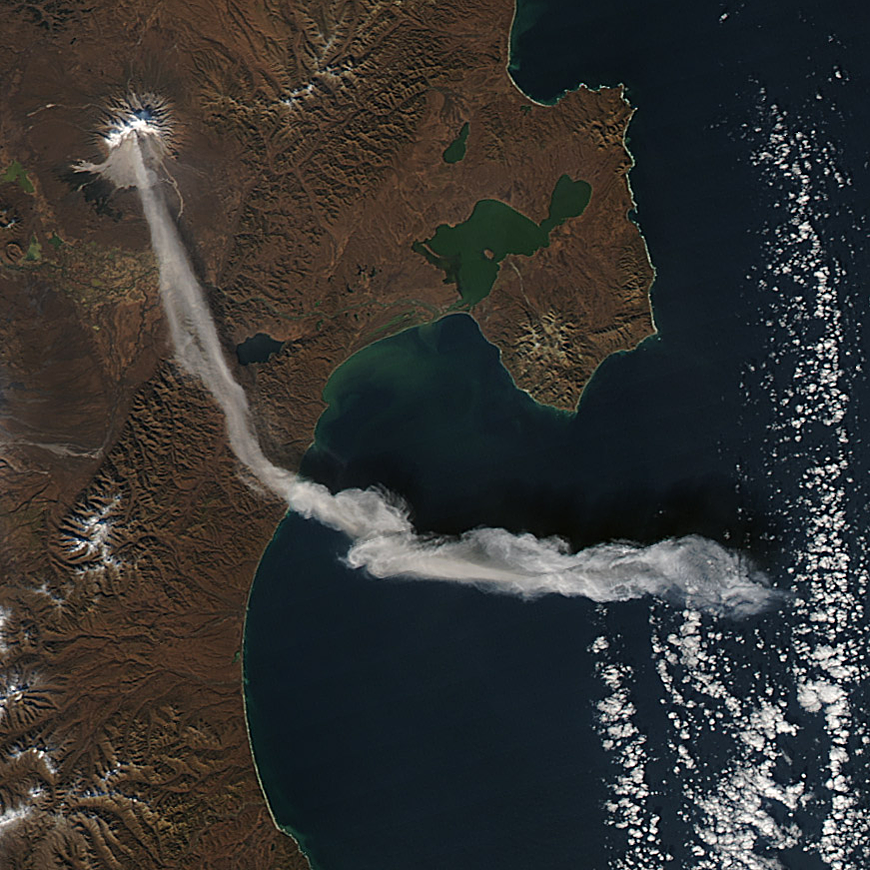
Activity on 6 November 2012

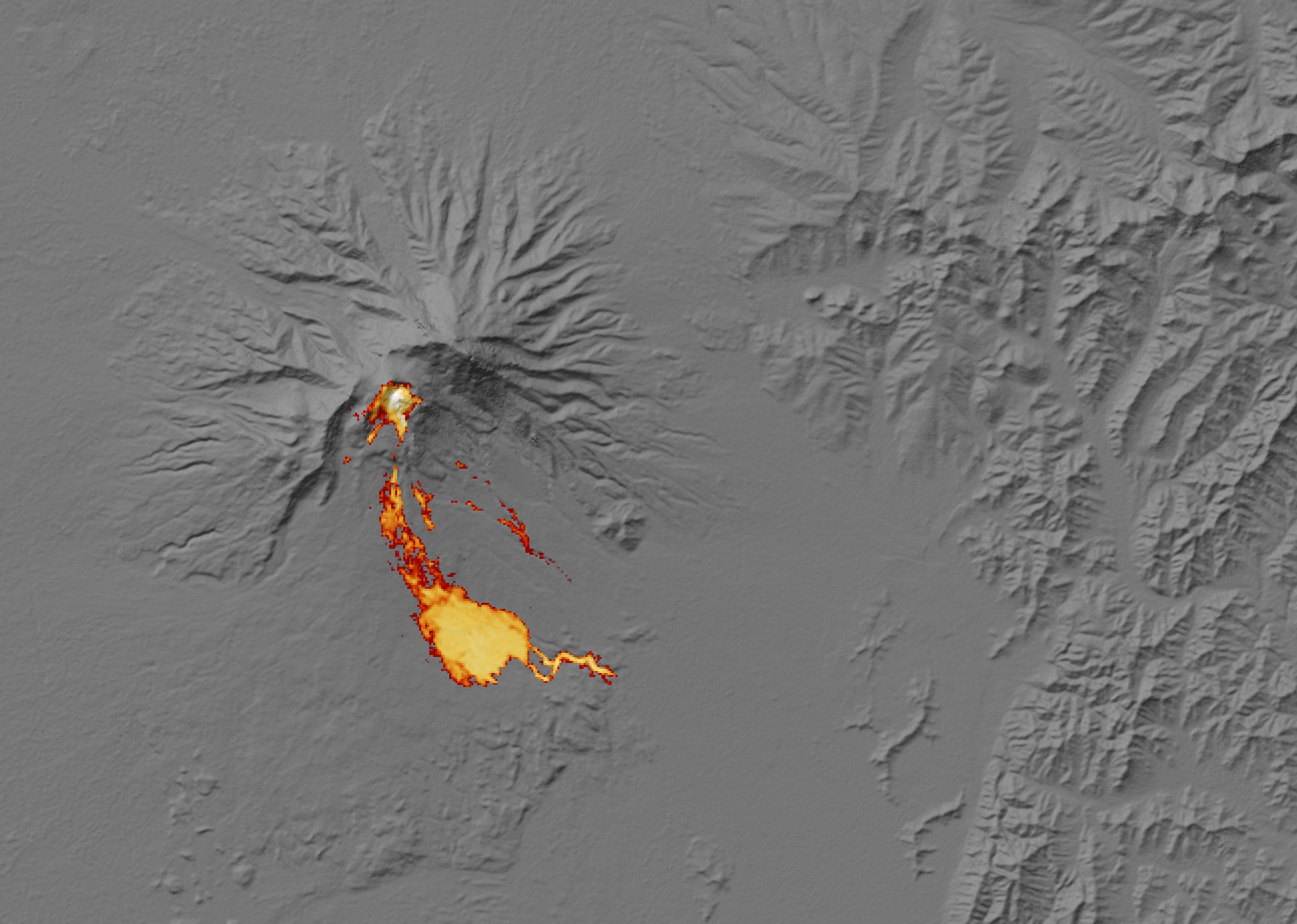
The heat signature of a pyroclastic flow on Shiveluch in January 2011

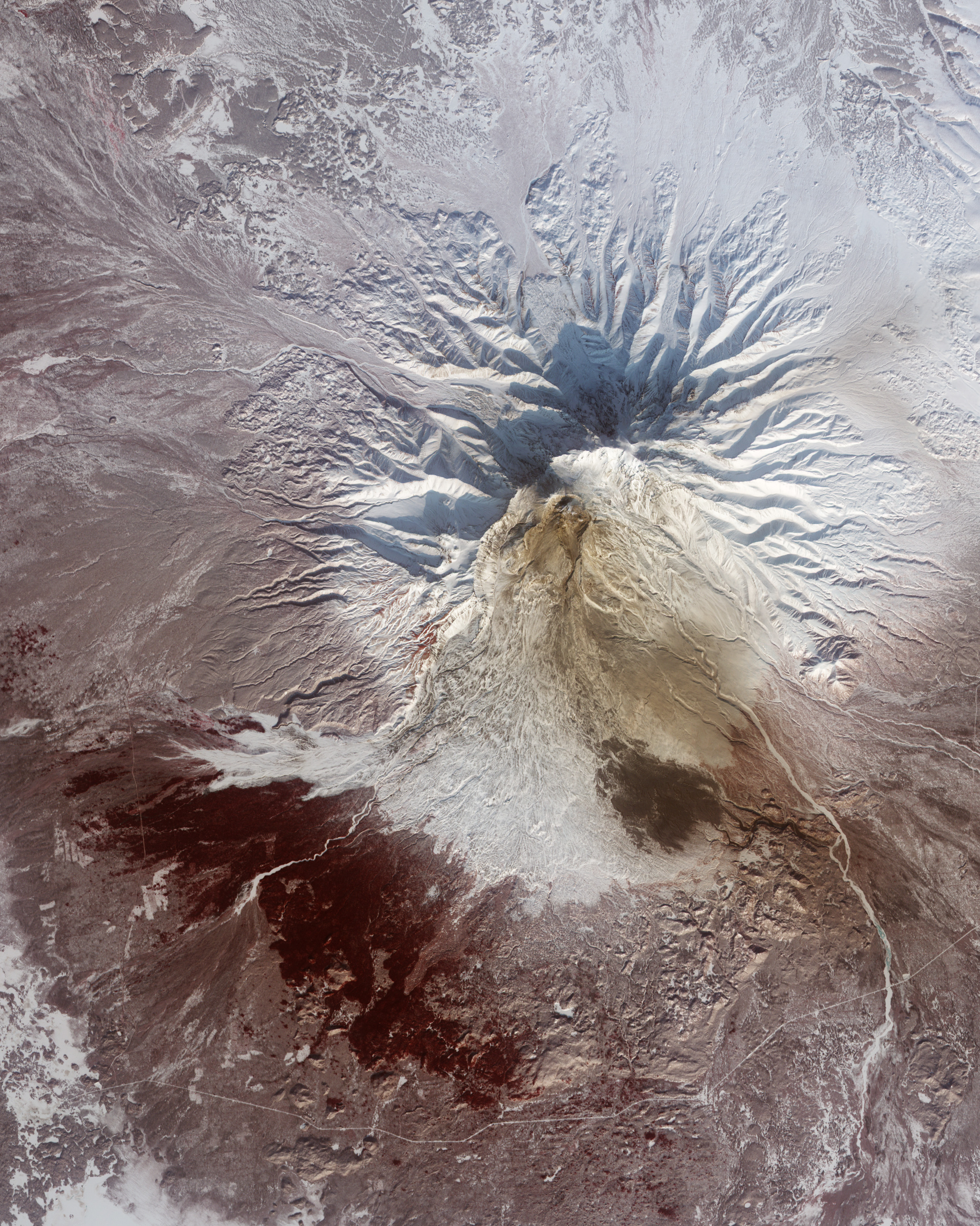
This false-colour satellite image shows the remnants of a large pyroclastic flow on the slopes of Shiveluch.

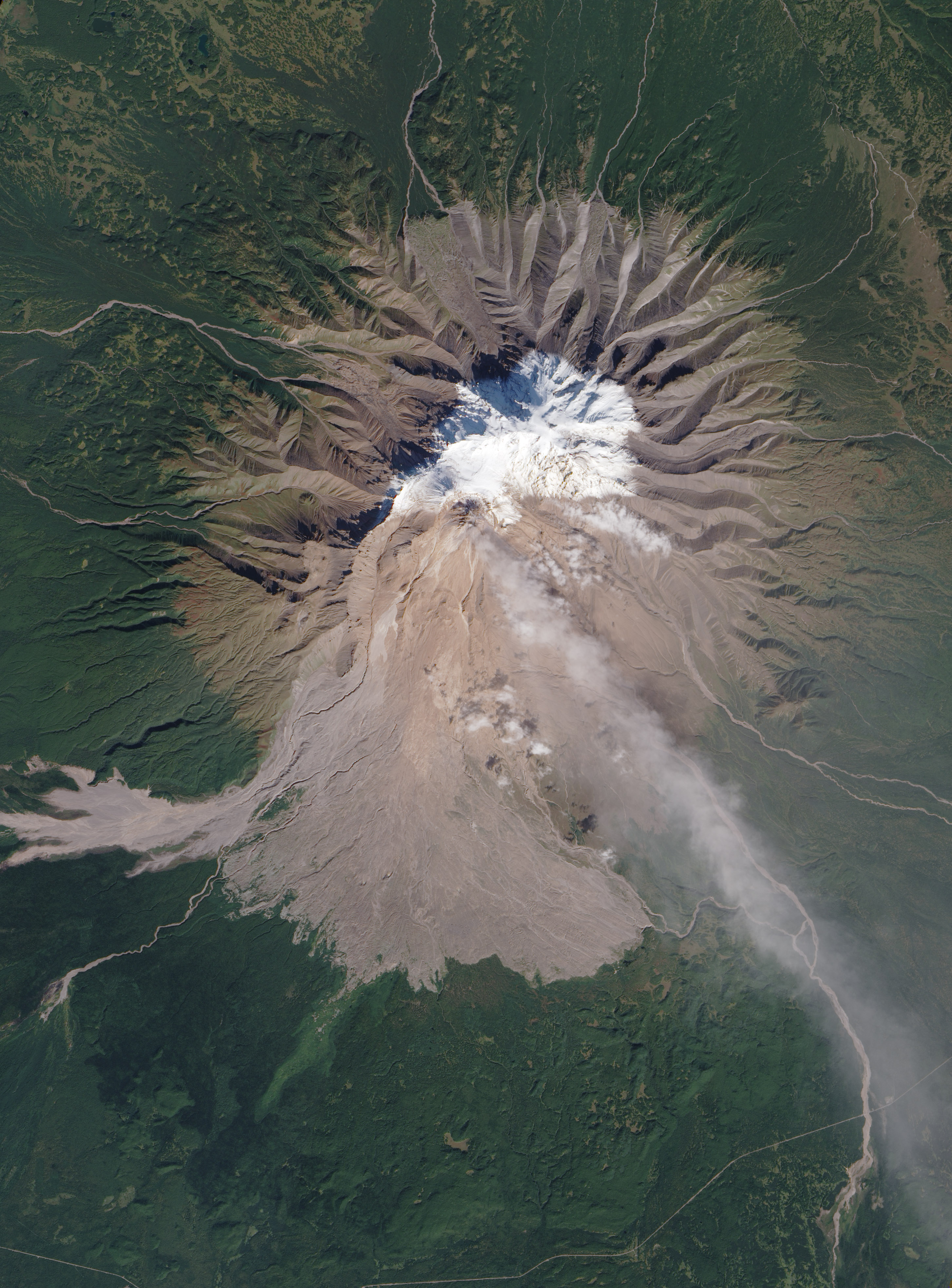
Activity on 7 September 2010

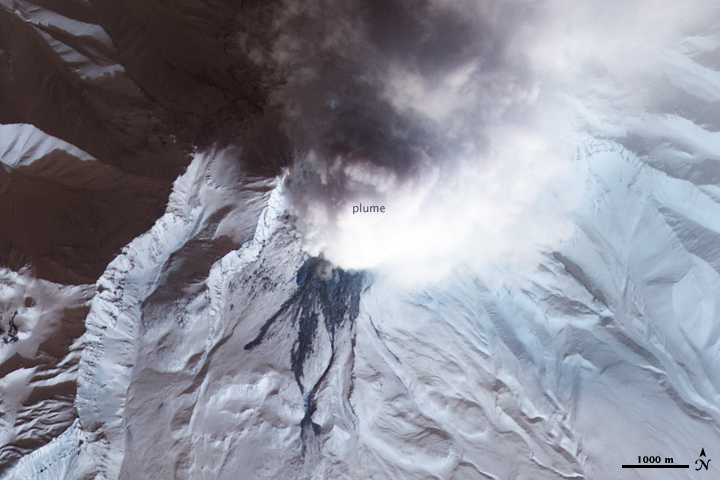
Activity on 13 February 2010

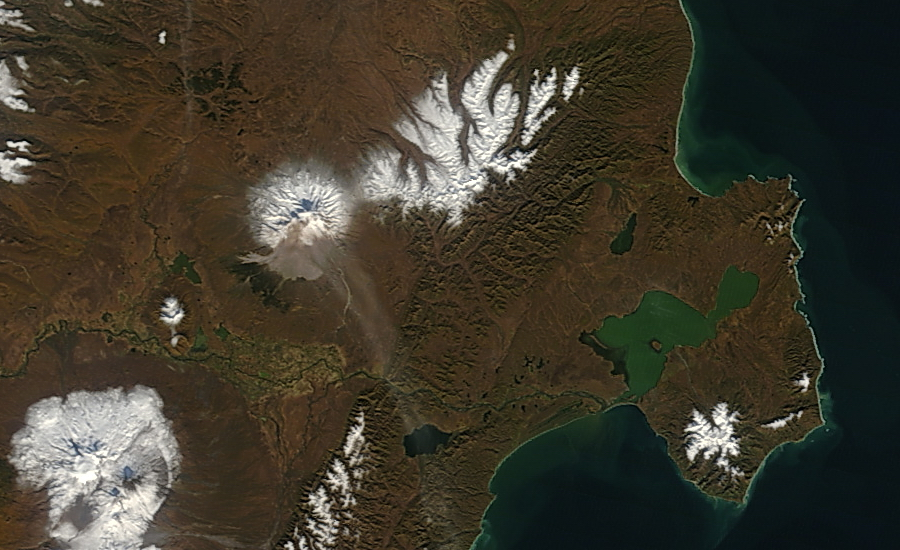
Activity on 3 October 2009

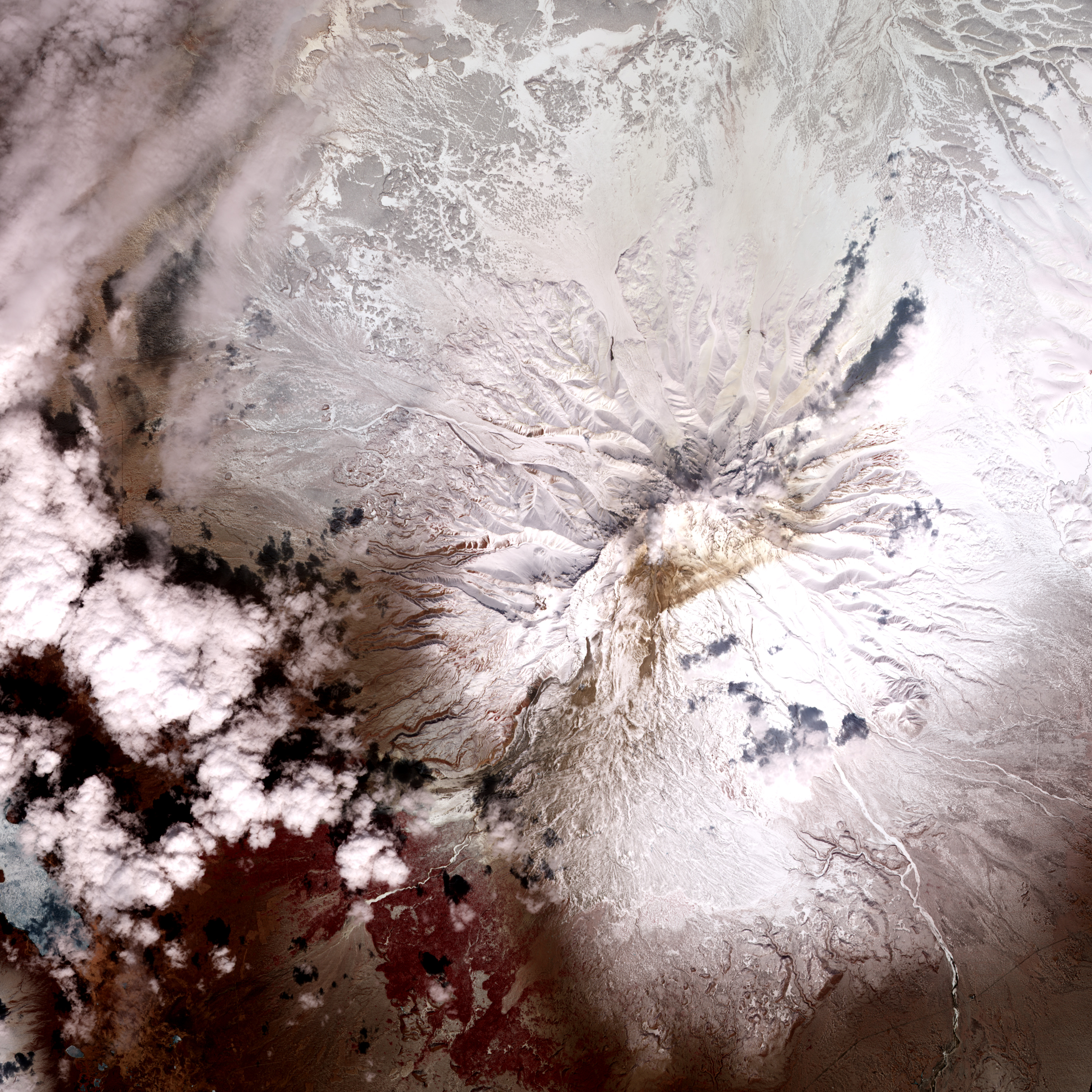
Shiveluch releases a small plume of vapour, 2009

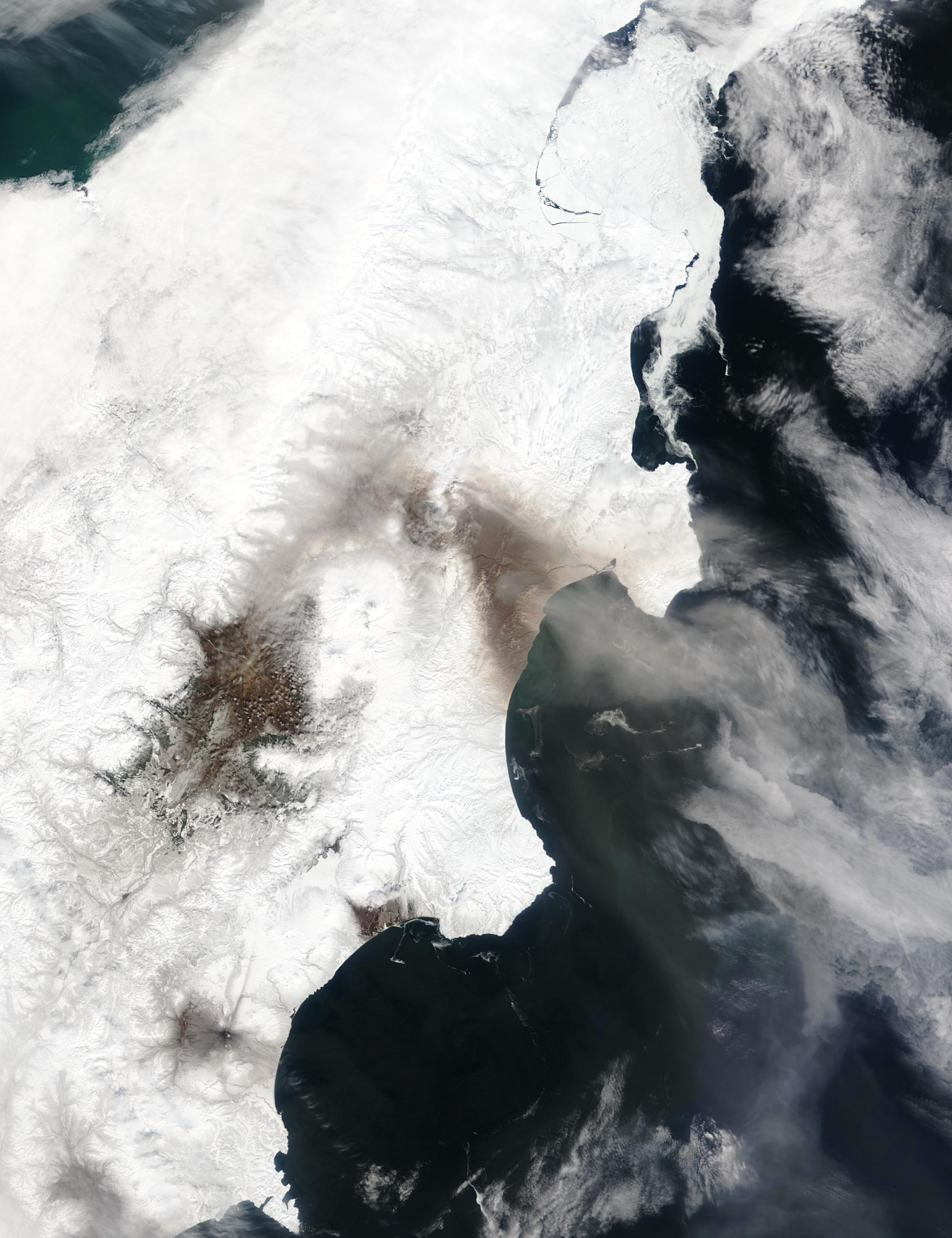
Activity on 9 May 2004

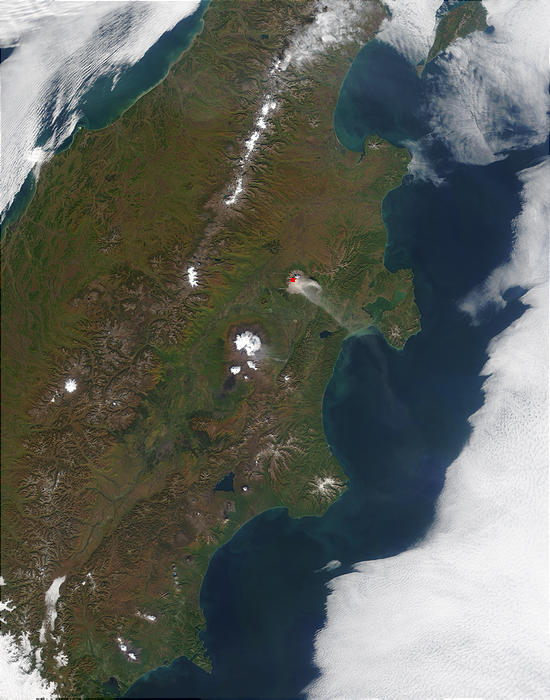
Activity (red dot) on 17 September 2002
