= Mishari =

Mishari is an Arabic origin masculine given name. People with the name include:

- Mishari bin Rashid Alafasy (born 1976), Kuwaiti imam
- Mishari bin Abdulaziz Al Saud (1932–2000), Saudi Arabian royal and businessman
- Mishari bin Saud Al Saud (born 1954), Saudi royal and governor
