= Badzhui people =

Muslim ethnic group in Tajikistan

Badzhui
баджавидж, баджуведж; баджуйцы баджувцы

Regions with significant populations
- Valleys around Yaghnob, Qul and Varzob Rivers and elsewhere in Tajikistan

Languages
- Badzhui language (variety of Shughni); Secondary: Tajik, Russian

Religion
- Predominantly Sunni Islam

Related ethnic groups
- Other Iranian peoples

The Badzhui (Bajuwi) are a subgroup of the Shughni group of Pamiris, although sometimes considered to be a distinct ethnographic group. They are primarily Sunni Muslim, unlike the Shughni who are Ismaili. The Badzhui are also known under the generic term Pamir people. They live in the Rushon District of the Gorno-Badakhshan Autonomous Region, Tajikistan.

== See also ==
- Pamiri people
- Pamir languages
