= Karymsky (volcano) =

Active stratovolcano on the Kamchatka peninsula of Russia

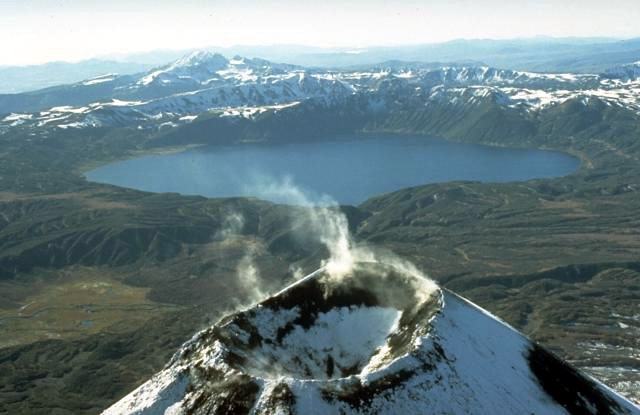
- The summit of Karymsky with the crater lake of Akademia Nauk volcano in the background.

Highest point
- Elevation: 1,536 m (5,039 ft)
- Coordinates: 54°02′52″N 159°26′32″E

Geography
- Location within Far Eastern Federal District Location within Kamchatka Krai
- Location: Kamchatka Peninsula, Russia
- Parent range: Eastern Range

Geology
- Rock age: Holocene
- Mountain type: Stratovolcano
- Last eruption: 2001 to 2026 (ongoing, non-stop)

Climbing
- Easiest route: basic rock/snow climb

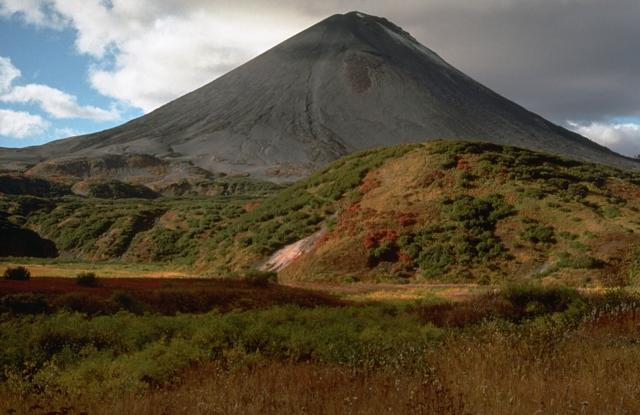
Karymsky, Side view.

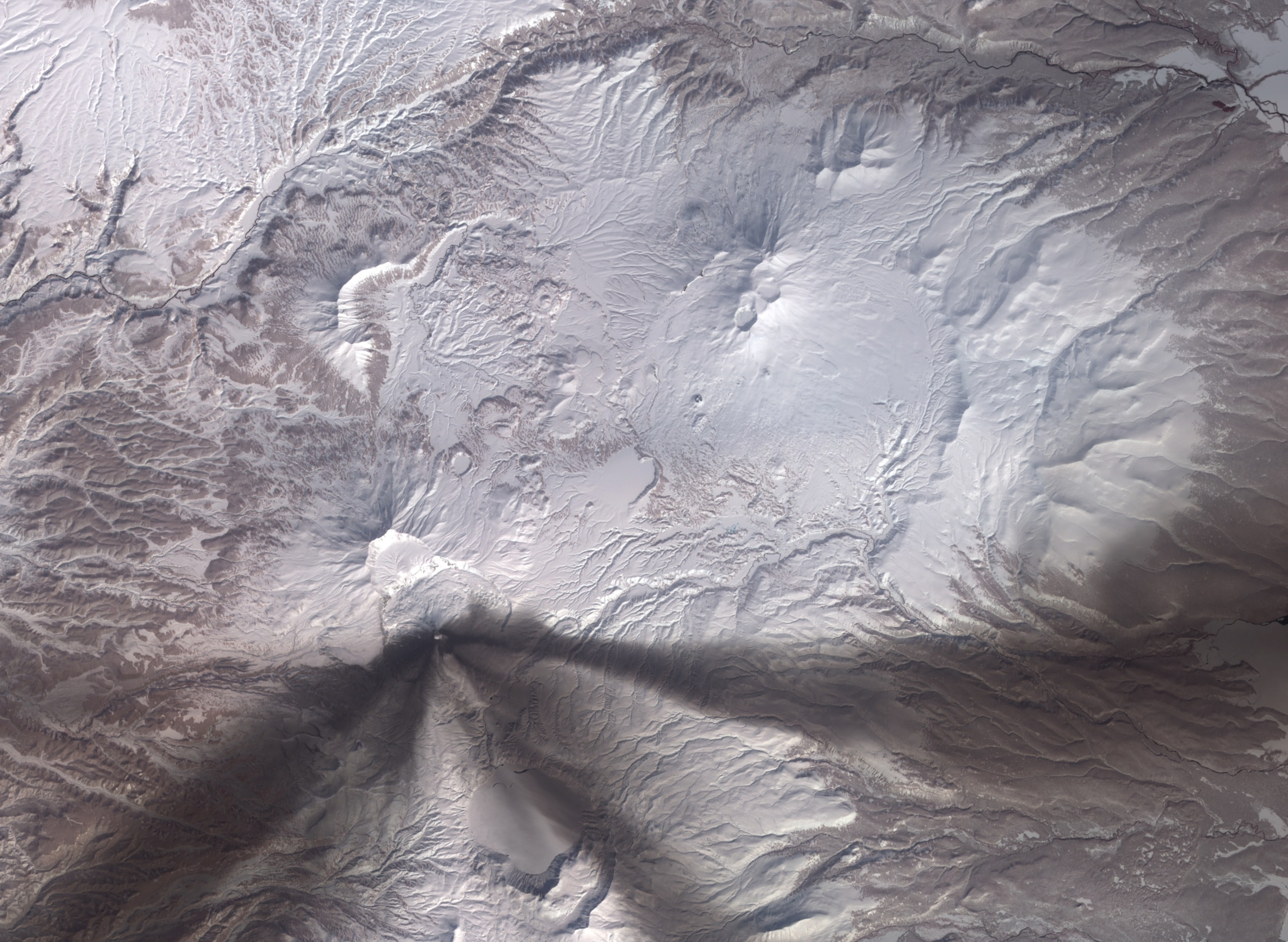
Satellite image of the area around the volcano. Ash from earlier eruptions has settled onto the snowy landscape, leaving dark grey swaths. The ash stains are confined to the south of the volcano's summit, one large stain fanning out toward the south-west, and another toward the east.

Karymsky (Russian: Карымская сопка, Karymskaya sopka) is an active stratovolcano on the Kamchatka Peninsula, Russia. It and Shiveluch are Kamchatka's largest, most active and most continuously erupting volcanoes, as well as one of the most active on the planet.

It is named after the Karyms, an ethnic group in Russia.

== Description ==
Karymsky is a symmetrical stratovolcano rising within a 5-km-wide caldera that formed during the early Holocene. Much of the cone is mantled by lava flows less than 200 years old. Historical eruptions have been vulcanian or vulcanian-strombolian with moderate explosive activity and occasional lava flows from the summit crater. There is currently an ongoing cycle of non-stop eruption occurring, and is the peninsula's most active, and reliable volcano, which has been erupting continuously since 1996.

== Eruptions ==
Karymsky has been linked to a large (VEI ≥ 6) eruption that dispersed ash over >1,500,000 km^{2} (580,000 mi^{2}) in approximately 177 ka B.P.

An ongoing cycle of almost continuous eruption has been occurring since 1996.

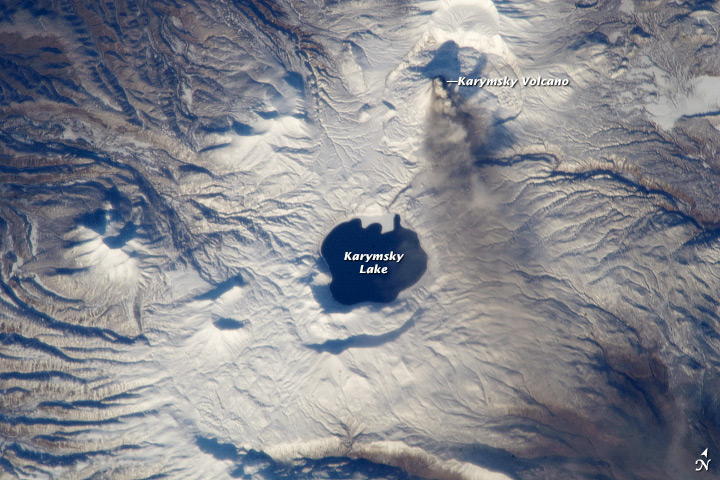
Karymsky Lake and Volcano

== See also ==
- List of volcanoes in Russia
- Kamchatka Volcanic Eruption Response Team
