= Archi people =

Ethnic group in Dagestan, Russia

Archi, Russian
Аршишттиб
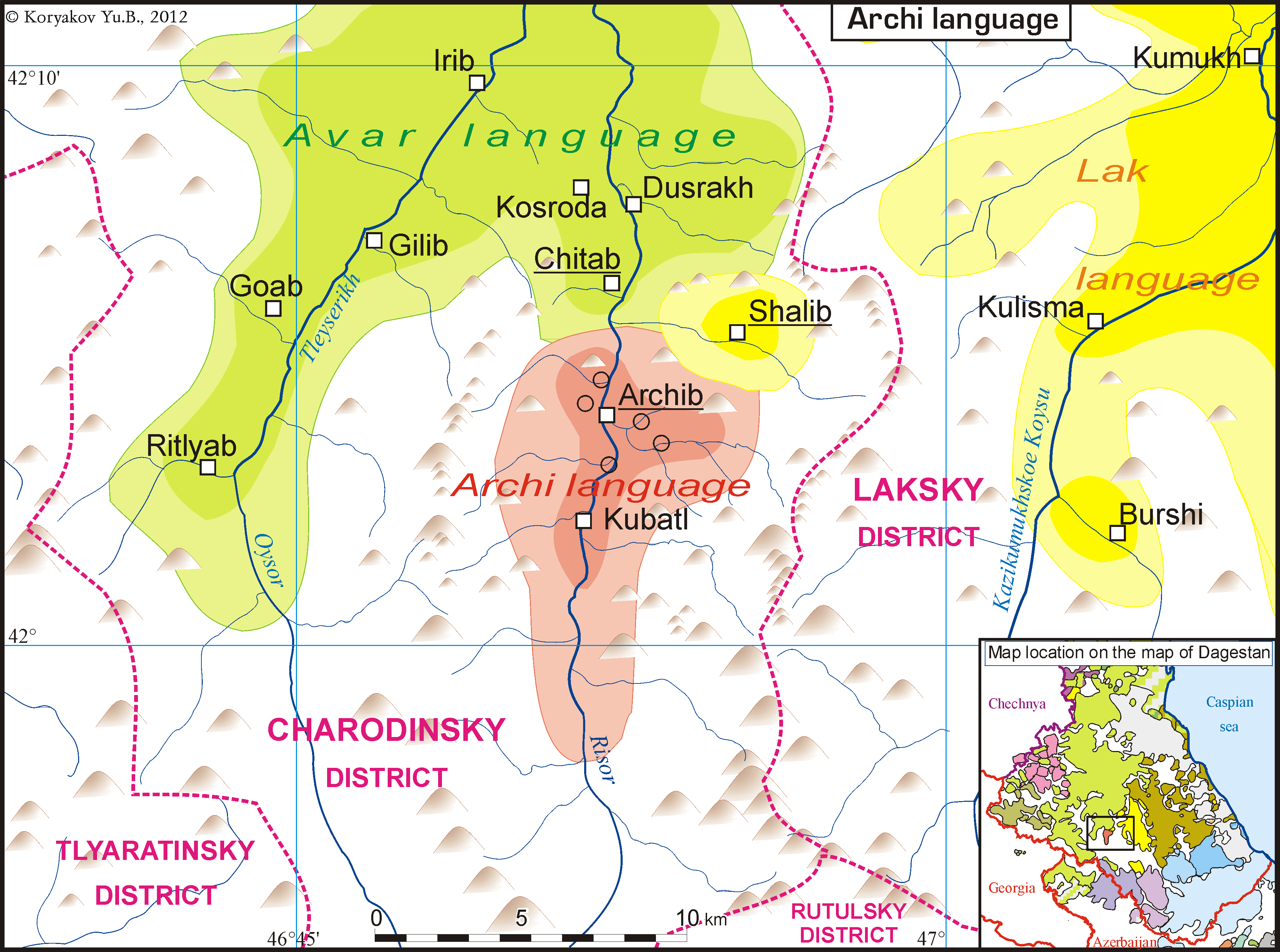
- Map of the Archi language and Archi villages.

Total population
- 5,000

Regions with significant populations
- Russia: 12

Languages
- Archi

Religion
- Sunni Islam

Related ethnic groups
- Other Lezgic peoples

The Archi people (Archi: аршишттиб, arshishttib,) are a Lezgic ethnic group who live in eight villages in southern Dagestan, Russia. Archib is the 'parent village' of these, because three months a year the whole community used to reassemble in Archib to engage in communal work. Their culture is one of the most distinct and best-preserved of all the cultures of Dagestan.

They have a total population of about 1,200, and speak their own language. Their habitat is about 2,000 meters above sea level in the Kara-Koisu basin in the Caucasus.

== History ==
The origin of the Archi people is unknown. Their name was first mentioned in the historical chronicles written by Muhammed Rafi from Shirvan in the 13th or 14th century. They were part of the Avar community Dursakh (or Rissib) and from time to time paid tribute to the Gazikumukh Khanate. They became subjects of the Russian Empire after Dagestan was annexed by Russia in 1813. According to the Brockhaus and Efron Encyclopedic Dictionary there were 802 Archis in Gazikumukh Okrug in 1886. Since 1899 they were part of the Gunib Okrug, Dagestan Oblast.

In 1921 they became part of the Dagestan ASSR. According to the First All-Union Census of the Soviet Union in 1926 there were 863 Archis in the Soviet Union. In the next censuses they were not considered a separate ethnic group, but rather as a subgroup of Avars. According to the Great Soviet Encyclopedia in the 1959 Soviet Census, all Archis declared themselves as Avars, though still preserving their native language and some ethnographic features. The 2002 Russian Census registered 89 Archis in Russia, which were again considered to be a subgroup of Avars. In the 2010 Russian Census there were only 12 Archis.

== Language ==
The Archi language is a Northeast Caucasian language of the Lezgic branch. It is colloquial, unwritten, and spoken only in several villages. Avar and Lak are widely spoken.

The first information about Archi language was a letter from Peter von Uslar to Franz Anton Schiefner dated June 11, 1863, which was published in the "Grammar of the Lak language" book as an appendix. Peter von Uslar tells an Archi legend about their language:

The God created nations and peoples; there were much less languages than peoples. The God was giving one shared language to several peoples, but all peoples were refusing to accept the most difficult language in the World, which finally became the language of the least numerous people in the World: Archi language and Archi people.

== Culture ==
The ethnonym Archi originates from the name of the village Archib in Lak. The main paradox with the Archi people is that although they are a subgroup of the Avar people by ethnic self-identification, their language is similar to the Lezgian people, and culture to the Avar people and Lak people. They were considered to be a subgroup of Avars in all Soviet censuses, and are still considered to be so in Russian censuses.

The Archi people are overwhelmingly Sunni Muslims. The existence of monuments written in Arabic in the Kufic script suggests that they converted to Islam not later than the 10th century.

== Famous Archi people ==
- Maksud Sadikov – a professor in international relations and Islamic economics
