= Karymsky Lake =

Lake in Kamchatka Krai, Russia

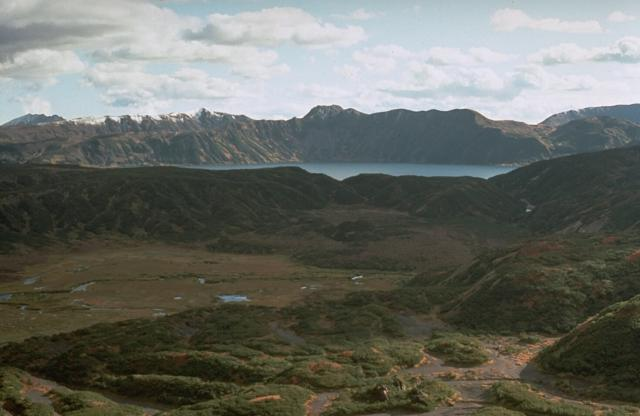

- Location within Kamchatka Krai
- Location: Kamchatka, Russia
- Coordinates: 53.98°N 159.45°E
- Type: Crater lake
- Basin countries: Russia

Karymsky Lake (Russian: Карымское озеро) is a volcanic crater lake located in the Akademia Nauk volcano on the Kamchatka Peninsula, Russia.

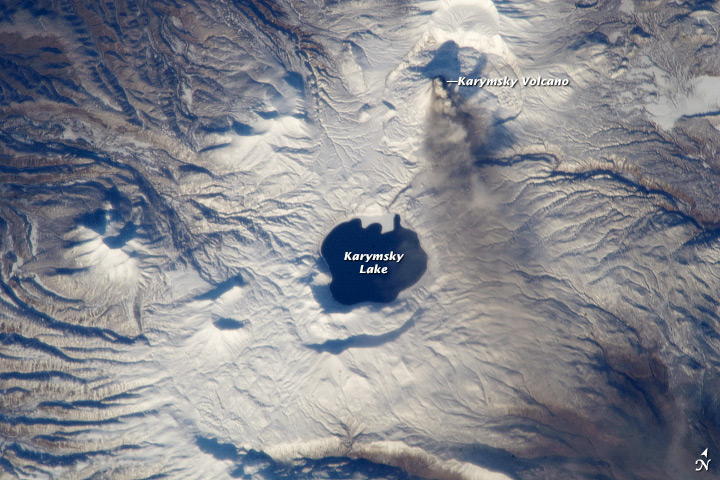
Karymsky Lake and Volcano

On midnight of 2 January 1996, Akademia Nauk and Karymsky Lake erupted. Eruptive pulses from the bottom of Karymsky Lake ejected steam and ash columns in the air every five to six hours for the 18 hours that followed, releasing approximately 30 to 40 million tons of highly acidic pyroclastic material in the air, tsunamis up to 20 meters (65 feet) also occurred. A new volcanic crater was also formed on the mountain's north coast. Much of the material, which was rich in sodium, sulfates, calcium, and magnesium, collapsed back into Lake Karymsky, changing its pH from 7.5 (neutral) to 3.2 (moderately acidic). The chemical change, plus a change in temperature, killed most of the life in the lake. The pH of Lake Karymsky had returned to neutral (7.54) by 2012, but it was still three times saltier than prior to the 1996 eruption.
