= Korobeynikovo =

Korobeynikovo Коробейниково
- Village
- Location within Altai Krai Location within Russia
- Coordinates: 52°11′N 83°42′E
- Country: Russia
- Region: Altai Krai
- District: Ust-Pristansky District
- Time zone: UTC+7:00

Korobeynikovo (Russian: Коробейниково) is a rural locality (a selo) and the administrative center of Korobeynikovsky Selsoviet, Ust-Pristansky District, Altai Krai, Russia. The population was 1,060 in 2016. There are 24 streets.

== Geography ==
Korobeynikovo is located on the on highway Aleysk - Petropavlovskoe - Biysk, 44 km south of Ust-Charyshskaya Pristan (the district's administrative centre) by road. Nizhneozernoye is the nearest rural locality.
