= Kamenschik =

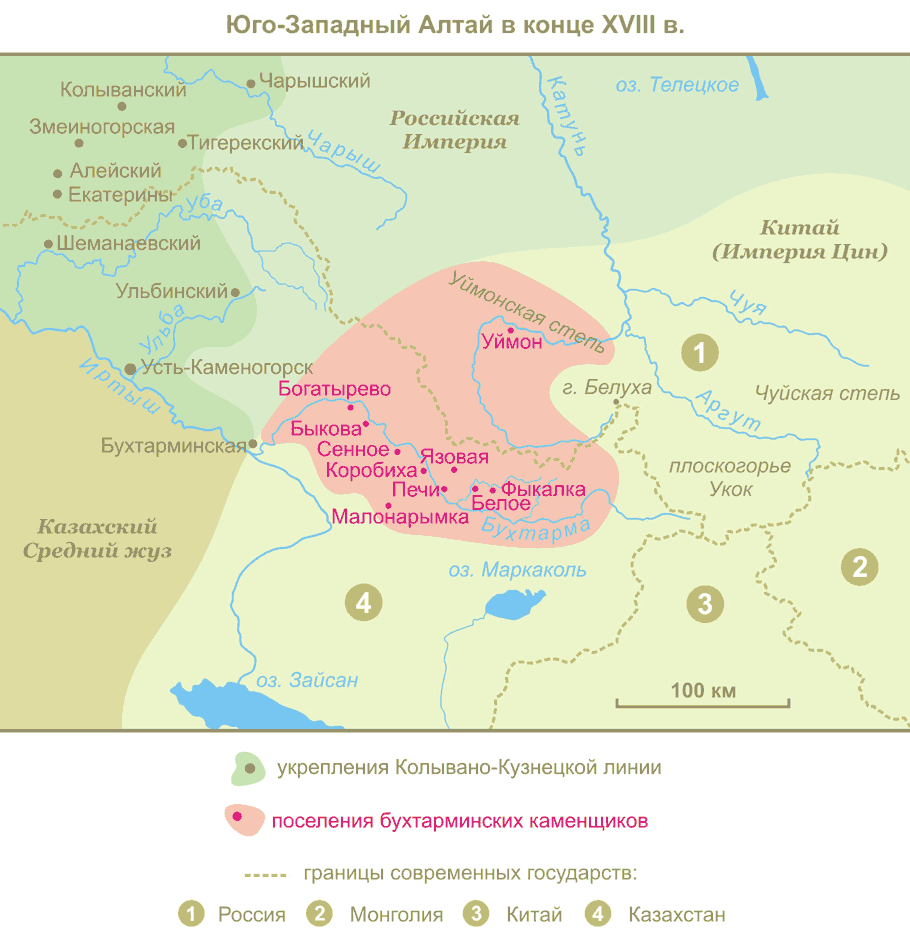
Kamenschik settlements in the late 18th century

The Kamenschiks (Russian: каменщики) or Bukhtarman are a group of Russians who descend from the earliest settlers of South Siberia. They are Old Believers and originally lived along the Kerzhenets River in Nizhny Novgorod Governorate. They later moved to the banks of the Bukhtarma River.

== History ==
From the early 18th century, fleeing persecution by the Russian Empire, Russians settled in the remote and vast southern region of the Altai Mountains. After the weakening and eventual defeat of the Dzungar Khanate by Qing Empire, the Bukhtarma region found itself in a neutral zone between the loosely defined borders of Russia and China. Rich in natural resources and beyond the legal reach of neighboring states, the area became a refuge for Old Believers, who began arriving in the 1720s, though documentary evidence dates their presence only to the 1740s. Their flight was driven by oppressive policies, including the imposition of taxes on Old Believers in the 1720s and a 1737 decree forcing them into labor at state-owned mines and factories.

The valley of the Bukhtarma River often became their final destination, and over time, this land came to be known as Belovodye.

The Bukhtarma settlement was founded by the peasant Afanasy Seleznyov, along with families such as the Berdyugins, Lykovs, Korobeinikovs, and Lysovs. Their descendants still inhabit villages along the banks of the Bukhtarma River.

Early settlements consisted of scattered homesteads and small villages of five to six households. The Kamenschiks engaged in hunting, agriculture, fishing, beekeeping, and later, the breeding of Altai deer. They traded furs and other goods with Siberian Cossacks, Kazakhs, Altaians, Chinese, and traveling Russian merchants. Villages were typically built near rivers, with mills and blacksmith shops serving as vital communal structures. By 1790, the number of villages had grown to 15. Some Kamenschiks later moved deeper into the mountains, settling along the Argut and Katun rivers, where they established the Old Believer Uimon Village and other settlements in the Uimon Valley.

After the founding of the Bukhtarma fortress, 17 Russian settlements were discovered in the surrounding mountains along the lower reaches of the Bukhtarma River.

On September 15, 1791, Empress Catherine the Great issued a decree incorporating the Kamenschiks (205 men and 68 women) and their settled lands into the Russian Empire as the Bukhtarma Inorodic Administration and Uimon Inorodic Administration. As "Inorodtsy" — a term for non-Russian ethnic groups within the empire — they paid taxes called "Yasak" in furs and animal skins. This status granted them certain freedoms but also placed them among the lower-ranked social classes. However, the Old Believers of Bukhtarma were exempted from administrative subordination, mining and factory work, conscription, and some other state duties.

After gaining official recognition as subjects of the Russian Empire, the Bukhtarma Kamenschiks relocated to more suitable areas. By 1792, the original 30 small settlements, each with only two or three households, had consolidated into nine larger villages with over 300 inhabitants: Osochikha (Bogatyrevo), Bykovo, Sennoye, Korobikha, Pechi, Yazovoye, Beloye, Fykalka, and Malonarymskoye (Ognevo).

In 1796, a new monetary tax was introduced, followed in 1824 by a different tax applied to settled Inorodtsy. The 1835 census recorded 326 Old Believer men and 304 women.

In 1878, the Bukhtarma and Uimon Inorodic Administrations were abolished and replaced by regular peasant administrations, eliminating all previous privileges.

By 1883, the Bukhtarma region, then part of the Biysk district of Tomsk Province, had a population of 15,503. This included 5,240 residents in the Zyryanovsk settlement, 4,931 peasants and 2,153 Inorodtsy in the Bukhtarma settlement, and 3,184 people in Bolshenarym. The Bukhtarma peasant settlement comprised 11 villages, where residents engaged in cattle breeding, farming, beekeeping, ore mining, and trade. Some settlements remained unknown to the authorities until the October Revolution and the subsequent period of Collectivization.

== Present days ==
As a result of the Stolypin reforms, Soviet, and post-Soviet cultural and political processes, as well as migration, the descendants of the Bukhtarma settlers now identify with the broader Russian ethnic group and reside in various regions of Kazakhstan, Russia, China, the United States, and other countries around the world. The largest concentration of Altai Kamenschik descendants remains in the cities and villages of East Kazakhstan Region, which encompasses the historical core of Kamenschik settlement.

During the 2002 Russian census, only two individuals identified themselves as Kamenschiks.
