= Archib =

Village in southern Dagestan, Russia

Coordinates: 42.070°N 46.888°E

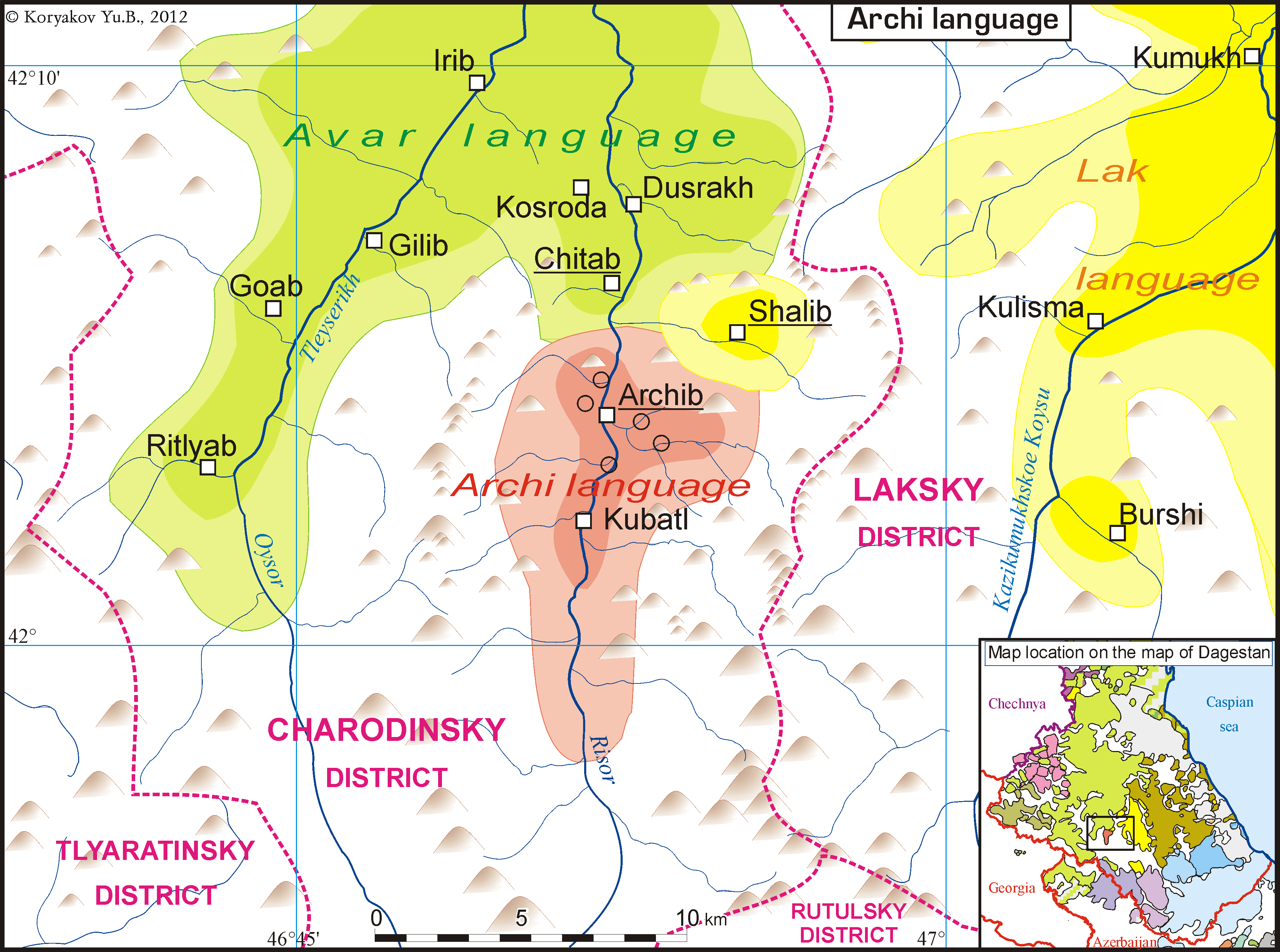
Map of the Archi language and the Archi villages. Archib is in the middle of the map.

Archib (Archi: Арша, ХьIере́ [χˤeré]; Russian: Арчиб; Avar: Рочиб) is a village in Southern Dagestan, Russia near the Azerbaijani border. It is the central village of the Archi people, who speak Archi.

It is a centre of Archibsky selsoviet in Charodinsky District. The postal code is 368457.
