= Karyms =

Ethnic minority in Russia

Karyms (Russian: Карымы) is an ethnic group in Russia with Russian, Evenki, and Buryat ancestry resulting from the lack of women among Russian settlers.

In the 2002 Russian Census, 2 persons self-identified themselves as Karyms and were included into the ethnicity "Russians".

The Russian volcano, Karymsky was named after the ethnic group.
