= Karymsky District =

Karymsky District Карымский район (Russian)
- District
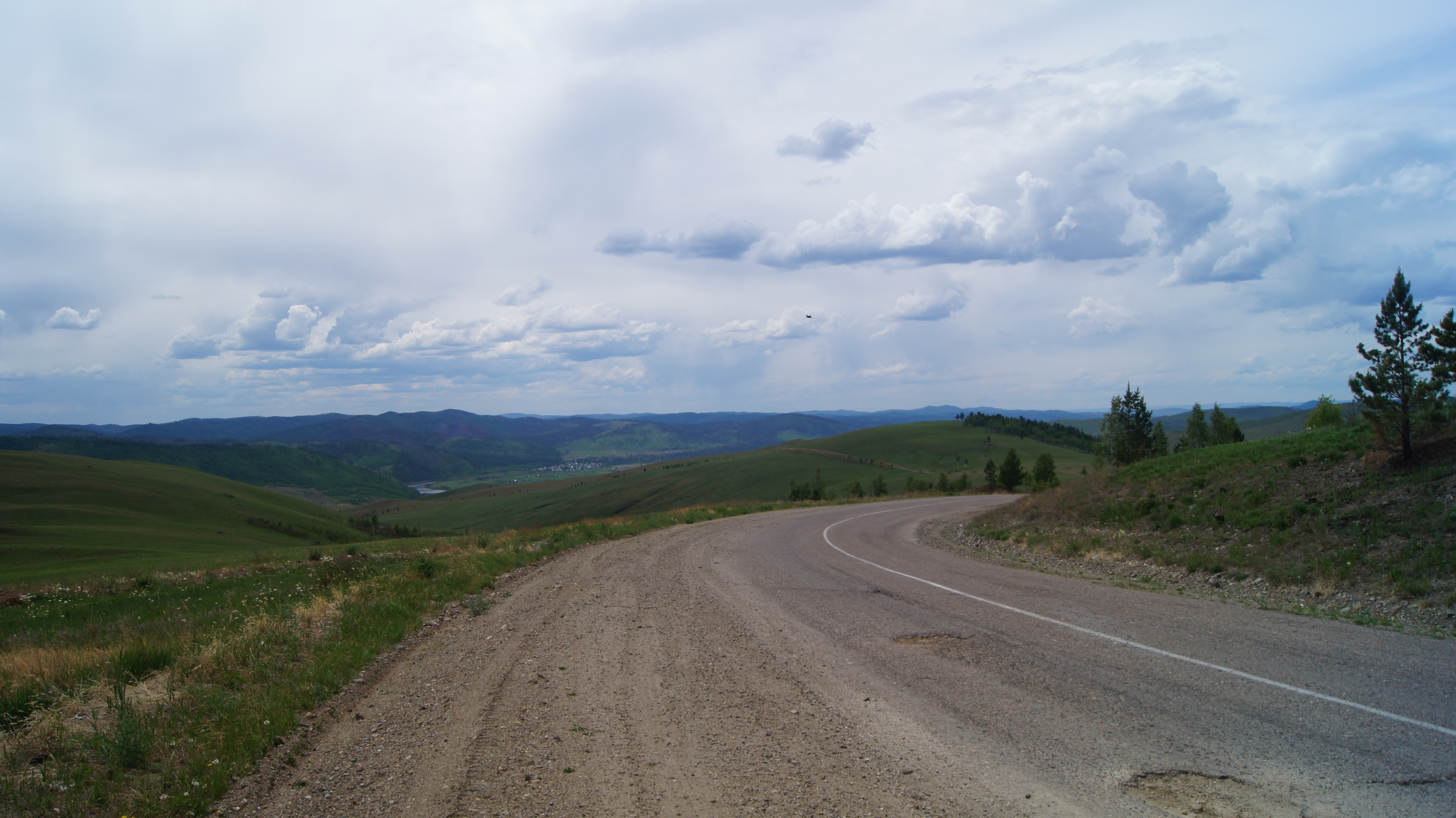
- View of the urban-type settlement of Atamanovka in Karymsky District

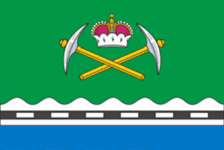
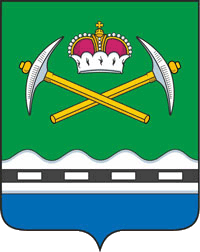
- Flag Coat of arms
- Location of Karymsky District in Zabaykalsky Krai
- Coordinates: 51°38′N 114°20′E
- Country: Russia
- Federal subject: Zabaykalsky Krai
- Established: January 4, 1926
- Administrative center: Karymskoye

Area
  - Total: 7,800 km^{2} (3,000 sq mi)

Population (2010 Census)
  - Total: 37,161
  - Estimate (2018): 35,291 (−5%)
  - Density: 4.8/km^{2} (12/sq mi)
  - Urban: 63.2%
  - Rural: 36.8%

Administrative structure
  - Inhabited localities: 3 urban-type settlements, 24 rural localities

Municipal structure
  - Municipally incorporated as: Karymsky Municipal District
  - Municipal divisions: 3 urban settlements, 10 rural settlements
- Time zone: UTC+9 (MSK+6)
- OKTMO ID: 76620000
- Website: http://карымское.рф

Population of Karymsky District
- 2010 Census: 37,161
- 2002 Census: 37,920
- 1989 Census: 44,728
- 1979 Census: 44,306

Karymsky District (Russian: Кары́мский райо́н) is an administrative and municipal district (raion), one of the thirty-one in Zabaykalsky Krai, Russia. It is located in the center of the krai and borders Tungokochensky District in the north, Shilkinsky District in the east, Aginsky District in the south, and Chitinsky District in the west. The area of the district is 7,800 square kilometers (3,000 sq mi). Its administrative center is the urban locality (an urban-type settlement) of Karymskoye. As of the 2010 Census, the total population of the district was 37,161, with the population of Karymskoye accounting for 35.1% of that number.

== History ==
The district was established on January 4, 1926. It is named after the ethnic group of Karyms.
