= Karymskoye =

Karymskoye Карымское
- Urban-type settlement
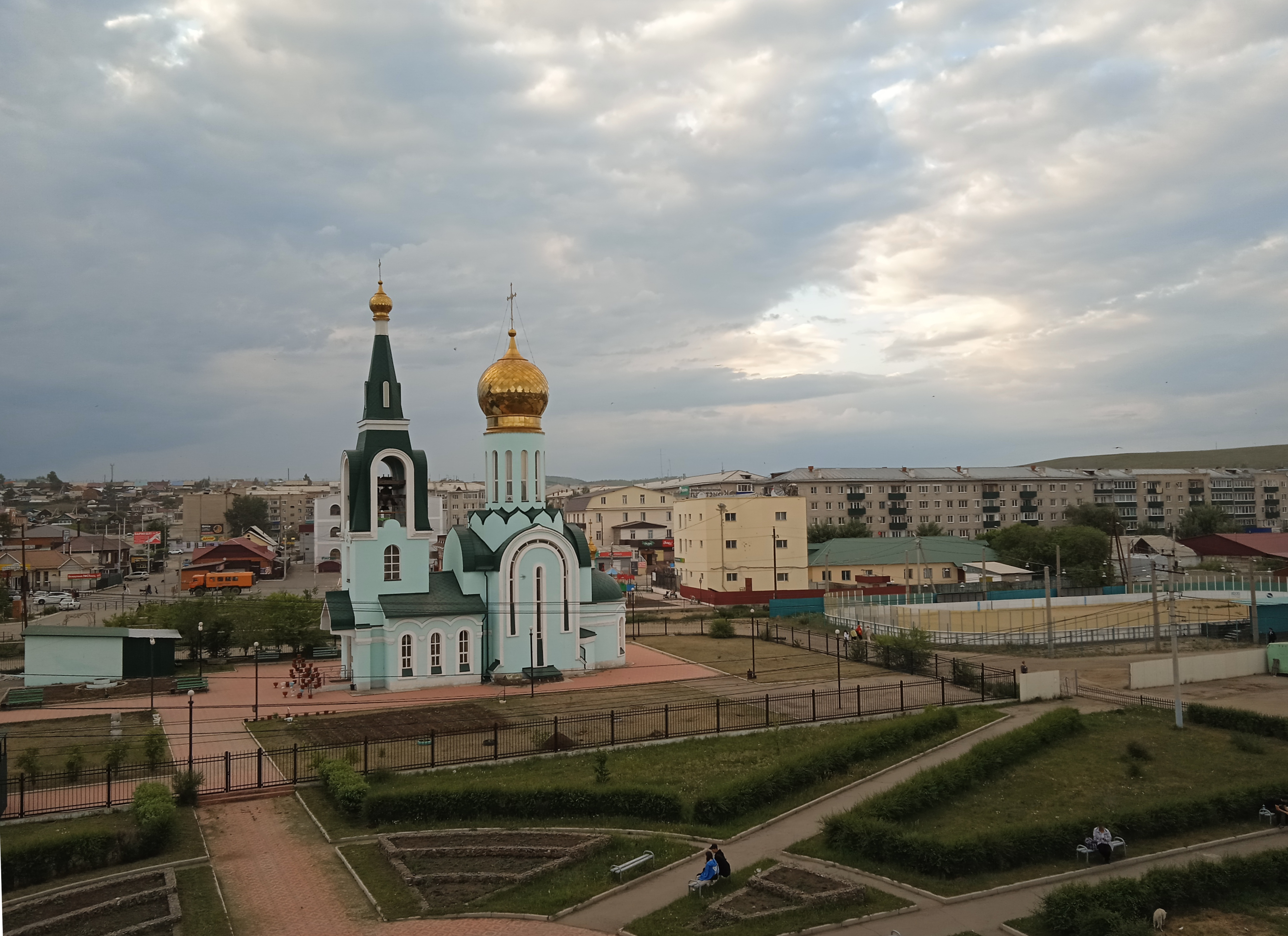
- Interactive map of Karymskoye
- Location of Karymskoye Karymskoye (Zabaykalsky Krai)
- Coordinates: 51°36′N 114°20′E
- Country: Russia
- Federal subject: Zabaykalsky Krai
- Administrative district: Karymsky District
- Founded: 1761

Population (2010 Census)
  - Total: 13,037
  - Estimate (2017): 12,861 (−1.4%)

Administrative status
  - Capital of: Karymsky District

Municipal status
  - Urban okrug: Karymskoye Urban Okrug
  - Capital of: Karymskoye Urban Okrug
- Time zone: UTC+9 (MSK+6)
- Postal code: 673300
- OKTMO ID: 76620151051

Karymskoye (Russian: Карымское; Buryat: Ага, Aga) is an urban locality (an urban-type settlement) and the administrative center of Karymsky District in Zabaykalsky Krai, Russia. Population: 13,037 (2010 census); 12,440 (2002 census); 15,692 (1989 Soviet census).

== History ==
Karymskoye was founded in 1761 by the baptized Tungus ("karym") Gantimurov family. After 1822, the settlement was subordinate to the Urulginskaya foreign council. Originally the village of Karymskoye was on the left bank of the Ingoda river. After the flood of 1897 the inhabitants moved to the railway station, built in 1897 on a high place. The village consisted of 4 short streets with 92 different kinds of buildings, including an elementary school, a resettlement center, several shops and a bathhouse. It has been the administrative center of the Karymsky district since 1926, and it received urban locality status in 1935. In 1982, the memorial "The Military Glory" was opened in honor of the soldiers who died in the Second World War.

== Economy ==
Karym Electromechanical Plant and the Karymsky integrated forestry plant are located in the town. There is also a butter factory, railroad enterprises. departments, road-repair construction management, and a bread-baking plant.
