= Kadazan people =

Indigenous ethnic group of Borneo

Kadazan people Kadazan
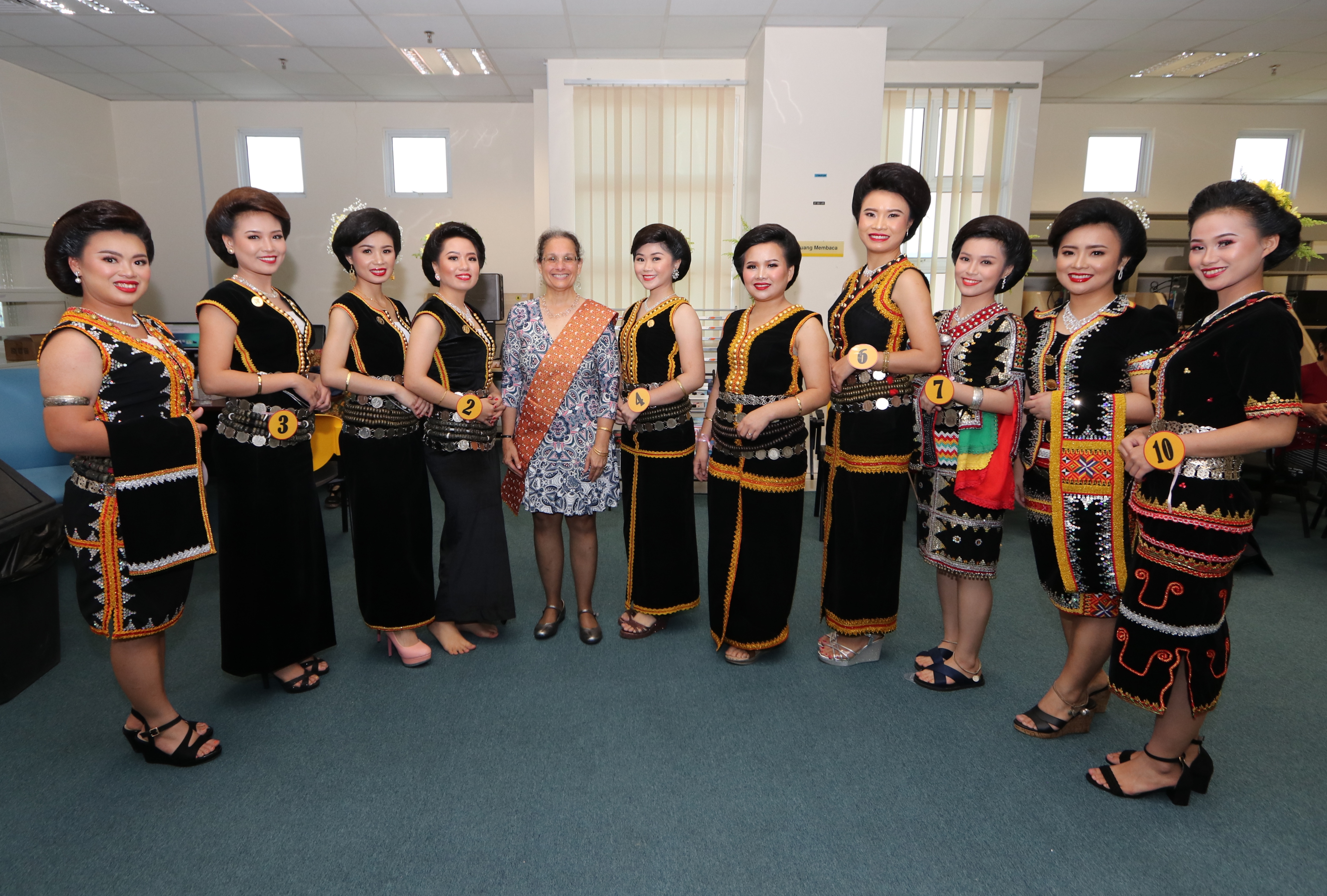
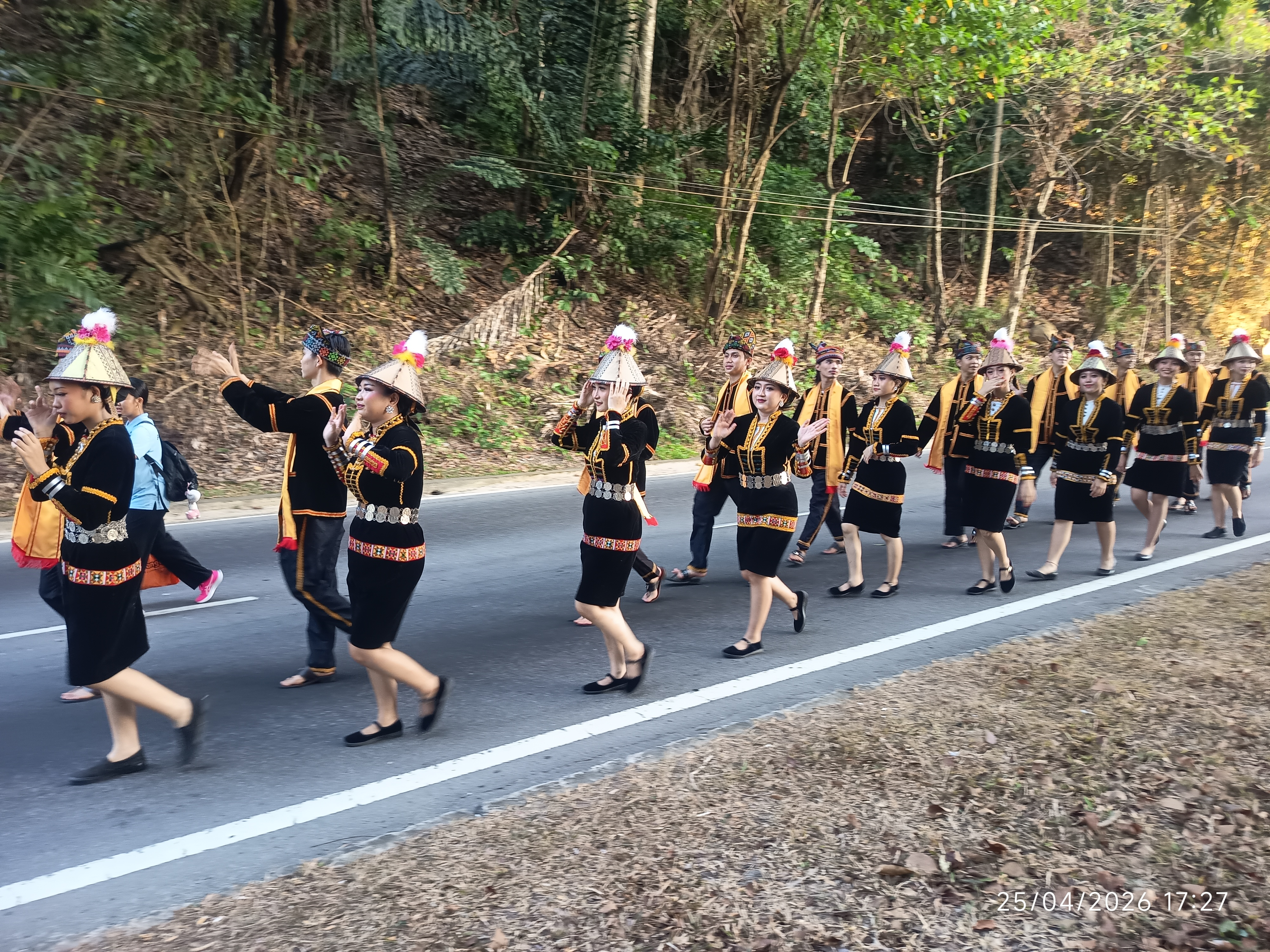
- Top: US ambassador Kamala Shirin Lakhdhir (sashed) flanked by Unduk Ngadau contestants wearing Penampang Kadazan attire during a visit to Likas Hospital of Kota Kinabalu, Sabah; Bottom: Papar Kadazan during the birthday celebration of the Yang di-Pertua Negeri of Sabah, Musa Aman, at Merdeka Square

Total population
- 38.7% of 51.9% Sabah Bumiputeras (2025); ~568,575 (2010) (Note: Based on the 2010 Malaysian Population Census, which is the last census categorised into specific ethnic groups, there were a total of 568,575 Kadazan-Dusuns (the census combined the total with the Dusun) in Sabah alone, although the total number of Kadazan-Dusun in other states of Malaysia was not provided in the census. Within the three districts of Sabah in both the West Coast and Interior divisions with large Kadazan populations, Penampang District recorded a total of 49,500, Papar District 26,800, and Beaufort District 12,400.)

Regions with significant populations
- Malaysia (Sabah, Labuan)

Languages
- Native; Coastal Kadazan, Klias River Kadazan, Eastern Kadazan, Sabah Malay; Also; Standard Malay, English

Religion
- Christianity (predominant), Momolianism, Sunni Islam

Related ethnic groups
- Dusun, Rungus, Murut, Sama-Bajau, Iranun, other Austronesian peoples

The Kadazan people, or simply the Kadazan, are an Austronesian ethnic group indigenous to Sabah, Malaysia. They primarily live in the West Coast Division, in the districts of Kota Kinabalu, Penampang, Putatan and Papar, the surrounding areas, and various locations in the Interior Division, such as Beaufort and Membakut, as well as, to a lesser extent, the eastern Kadazan of Labuk-Kinabatangan, as well as in the Federal Territory of Labuan.

The Kadazan form another major indigenous ethnic group along the western coast of Sabah with rich traditional heritage, distinct attires, language and customs, with an estimated 568,575 (combined with the Dusun) spread across the state. They are among the earliest indigenous peoples on northern Borneo exposed to the early Christian mission and faced various interactions with the Sultanate of Brunei in the 18th century and later the British that resulted in their rapid subsequent modernisation in the late 19th century, when many of the British administration towns within North Borneo were constructed near many of the settlements of the Kadazan. The majority of the Kadazan are Roman Catholics, though traditional culture remains important to the community, with their adat (customs) recognised by the Native Court of Sabah.

As a result of integration in culture and language, as well as for political initiatives, the new term "Kadazan-Dusun" was created to combine Kadazan and Dusun as a single group. Together, they are the largest indigenous ethnic group in Sabah. They have been internationally recognised as an indigenous group found on the northern part of the island of Borneo since 2004 by the United Nations Educational, Scientific and Cultural Organization (UNESCO).

== Etymology ==
The origin of the term "Kadazan" remains disputed, with several explanations proposed through oral traditions, linguistic interpretations and historical accounts. The term "Kadazan" is believed to have emerged in records as early as the 1880s, as this term was widely used by Roman Catholic Christian missionaries, as documented by Fr. J. Staal. He recorded in his 1923 article, The Dusuns of North Borneo: Their Social Life,

...the Dusuns do not call themselves by this name. These of the interior, generally, call themselves according to the regions they inhabit; these living among the hills are called "Tahgas" and "Tidong", whilst those near the coast name themselves "Kadazan" or "Kadayan".

The term has been used long before the 1950s. Owen Rutter, in his book, The Pagans Of North Borneo, published in 1929, wrote:

The Dusun usually describes himself generically as a tulun tindal (landsman) or, on the West Coast, particularly at Papar, as a Kadazan.

Rutter worked in Sabah for five years as District Officer in all five residencies and left Sabah with the onset of the First World War. He started working in Sabah (then North Borneo) in 1910 and left in 1914. The term "Kadazan" was already in existence long before the 1950s, and Kadazan politicians did not invent the term, but rather propagated it. According to Richard F. Tunggolou, Lotud Dusun bobolian Odun Badin interpreted the term "Kadazan" as meaning "people of the land", an explanation that associates the name with the indigenous people's connection to the land they inhabit. A similar interpretation was reportedly given by bobohizan Dousia Moujing, who was of Kadazan descent. Both interpretations were attributed to traditional religious practitioners, whose explanations offer an insight into how the term "Kadazan" was understood within the indigenous communities of Sabah.

One proposed etymology suggests that the name "Kadazan" derives from kadayan, a Dusun word meaning “person”. This interpretation is supported by its appearance in a Lotud Dusun chant, where kadayan is used with another term, ulun, referring to people or a person. (Note: The word "kadayan" is a moribund word, like many other terms that are only used in chants.) The interpretation suggests that Kadazan may have originated as a designation referring to people rather than from the name of a particular settlement or geographical feature.

Proposed etymological relationship between Proto-Malayo-Polynesian *daya, Dayak daya, Lotud Dusun kadayan and Malay kedayan

The Dusun term "kadayan" traces its roots back to ancient times, as it is used in inait. Kadayan is believed to have originated from daya, meaning "inland" or "upstream". Under this interpretation, ka-...-an is a Proto-Austronesian circumfix used in the formation of abstract nouns. Comparable formations include Kadazan-Dusun komuhakan, derived from muhok, or "young", referring to the youth, and the Paiwan term "kacalisian", derived from calisi, or "mountain slope", referring to people associated with the mountains. Malay kedayan likely derives from Dusun kadayan through Brunei Malay or Bisaya. This theory points to the well-established historical roots of the Dusun term. Interpretations of the Dusunic term "kadayan" include "person", "people of the land", particularly agricultural inhabitants in contrast to maritime populations, whereas the Malay literary term "kedayan" denotes a servant or an escort. However, it has not been confirmed whether kadayan is related to *daya, daya and kedayan. The term "Kadazan" later became an important ethnic identity, particularly among coastal communities in Papar, who rejected the designation "Dusun", which they considered derogatory. (Note: The spelling "Kadazan", particularly the use of the letter "z", has been attributed to Kadazan speakers' tendency to modify Dusun words to suit their phonetic preferences.) However, British colonial records generally classified these communities as Dusun rather than Kadazan. (Note: The Kadazan never accepted the derogatory term "Dusun" to refer to them. Today, the Kadazan is referred to as Kadazan, and this is attributed to the propagation of the term by Donald Stephens in the 1950s. He established a section called "Kadazan Corner" in the local newspaper Sabah Times in 1953.)

While the term "Kadazan" became very common in Papar, most Kadazan people in Penampang in the past referred to themselves as Tangara', the original name of the Kadazan according to the legend of Nunuk Ragang. The Kadazan in Papar wanted to replace the designation "Dusun" with the term "Kadazan" in an effort to reclaim their dignity and assert recognition of their distinct identity. The adoption of Kadazan was an effort to establish an indigenous identity and replace the colonial-era designation "Dusun", which many Kadazan leaders considered derogatory and associated with rural backwardness. This movement gained momentum with the formation of the United National Kadazan Organisation (UNKO) in 1961, under Donald Stephens, who sought to popularise Kadazan as a broader identity for Sabah's non-Muslim indigenous population, but he failed to do so as it was contested by the Dusun. However, since the formation of Malaysia, most of the Kadazan in Penampang and Papar have left the designation "Dusun" for good and assigned Kadazan on their children's birth certificates, and most have updated their identifications. (Note: Political developments in Sabah, especially the formation of the United National Kadazan Organisation (UNKO) in 1961, were among the main factors that encouraged the people of Penampang and Papar to identify collectively as Kadazan.)

Rungus oral tradition associates "Kadazan" with the word "kakadazan" or "kakakadazan", referring to a commercial establishment or a town. This claim is supported by the documented presence of Kadazan communities on the west coast of Sabah, stretching from Tuaran to Bongawan, which was a trading hub during the Bruneian Sultanate rule. According to the account, the Rungus referred to the coastal population as tulun antad sid kakadazan, meaning "people from the town".

== Background and origins ==
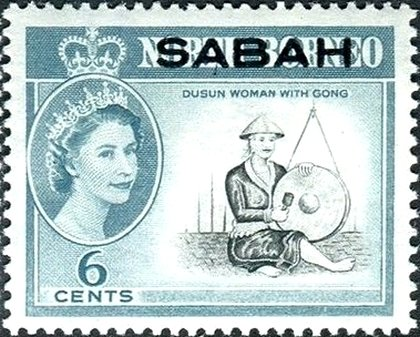
A Dusun woman (Note: The Kadazan were once categorised as part of the Dusun group throughout British North Borneo Population Census.) (Kadazan woman) with a gong featured in a 1964 6¢ postage stamp of North Borneo (present-day Sabah) with a portrait of Queen Elizabeth II

Since the 15th century, the Dusun sub-ethnic group, Tangara (Kadazan), has been living along the Kinarut, Putatan and Papar rivers, including the Moyog River of Penampang, on the western coast of Sabah. Their locations are within the flat plains and lowland areas of Papar and Penampang, where wet rice cultivation was once the main occupation among them, whereas most of the Dusun are located within the hill regions and upland valleys of the interior.

The thalassocracy rule of the Sultanate of Brunei greatly influenced the traditional life of the tribe that soon became known as the Kadazan. In the Bruneian era, there was a presence of Bruneian overlords or tax collectors, referred to as pengiran throughout the rule of the Sultanate of Brunei. The pengiran, who owned and managed rivers, derogatorily referred to the Kadazan as Dusun. The people along the rivers were treated as "property", and they were made to pay taxes annually to the pengiran, who shared their income with the Bruneian royalty. The derogatory term "Dusun" used against the Kadazan became one of the main reasons they experienced an identity crisis that lasted until 1953, when the Kadazan Society of Penampang was established. To the Bruneian tax collectors, who were Muslims, the Kadazan were uncivilised kafirs or yokels, which all led to the dysphemism "Dusun" and the exacerbation of Islamophobia among the community. To this day, the term "Dusun" remains sensitive to the Kadazan due to intolerance towards any attempts to challenge the established Kadazan identity.

The Kadazan of Penampang and Papar were officially referred to by the tax collector of the Sultanate of Brunei as Orang Dusun, a common noun phrase which literally means "people of the orchard", owing to their agricultural occupations, similar to the Dusun, although in reality, the Orang Dusun within the area were actually Kadazan.

Their first encounter with the British was in the late 19th century, and the animist Kadazan were among the earliest North Bornean indigenous ethnic groups to be exposed to Christian missionary influence throughout the British rule, with one of the earliest interactions taking place near the Putatan River. English historian, novelist and travel writer Owen Rutter wrote in 1922 that the indigenous people on the west coast, especially in Papar, preferred to call themselves Kadazan, thus distinguishing themselves from the Dusun, although administratively, at the time, everyone was categorised as "Dusun" by the British.

Before the 1960s, the Kadazan were earlier grouped together with other Dusunic tribes in the North Borneo Census as the term "Dusun" was used by the British protectorate and colonial authorities to represent all Dusunic-speaking tribes and sub-tribes in North Borneo. The present-day ethnic group of Kadazan was originally called Tangara or Tanga, who refused to be grouped into the larger Dusun grouping due to past issues throughout the British colonial rule. (Note: The Tangara of Penampang and Papar is a Kadazan-Dusun tribe who resist the "Dusun" term once coined by early Chinese and Brunei overlords due to a previous dark history related to the "Tagahas Dusun" for betrayals during a conflict with Mat Salleh in Tambunan. Similarly, the Lotud Dusun of Tuaran were also against the term "Kadazan" referring to the Tangara of Penampang and Papar until the problem of the terms "Kadazan" and "Dusun" was settled with the recognition of each other.) It was through the establishment of the Kadazan Society of Penampang during the administration of the Crown Colony of North Borneo in 1953 that this term was corrected and replaced by "Kadazan".

With the formation of the Federation of Malaysia in 1963, comprising North Borneo, Sarawak, Singapore and Malaya, the indigenous communities of Penampang and Papar, formerly identified as "Dusun", were officially classified as "Kadazan", and the Kadazan Cultural Association (KCA) was formed in 1966 so as to officially represent the Kadazan. The Kadazan were especially represented through the efforts of the first chief minister of Sabah, Donald Stephens, who was the president of KCA, being Kadazan himself.

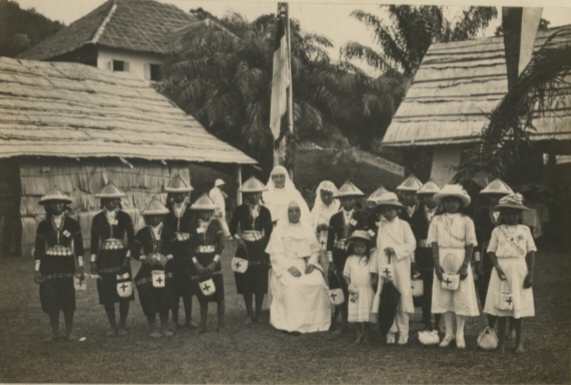
Papar Kadazan women with Catholic missionaries in Jesselton, c. 1918

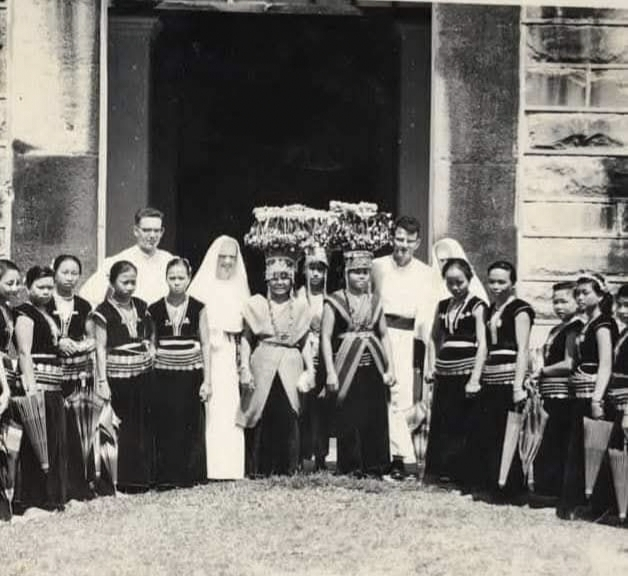
Penampang Kadazan bobohizan alongside friars and nuns during a wedding ceremony at St. Michael's Church of Penampang District, c. 1950s

Following attempts at using the term "Kadazan" as the sole term to represent the Dusunic identity and the subsequent "Kadazanisation", a dispute then arose within the Dusun community over its opposition to the ethnic term. The following year, in 1967, the United Sabah Dusun Association (USDA) was formed as the sole representative body for all the Dusun as a way to distinguish themselves from the Kadazan. Thereafter, the two major indigenous ethnic groups have separated with two representative bodies, further emphasising the terms "Kadazan" and "Dusun". Through mediation and, finally, under the efforts of Chief Minister Joseph Pairin Kitingan, both the KCA and the USDA were merged into a single representative body called the Kadazan Dusun Cultural Association (KDCA) in 1989.

=== "Out of Taiwan" origin theory ===
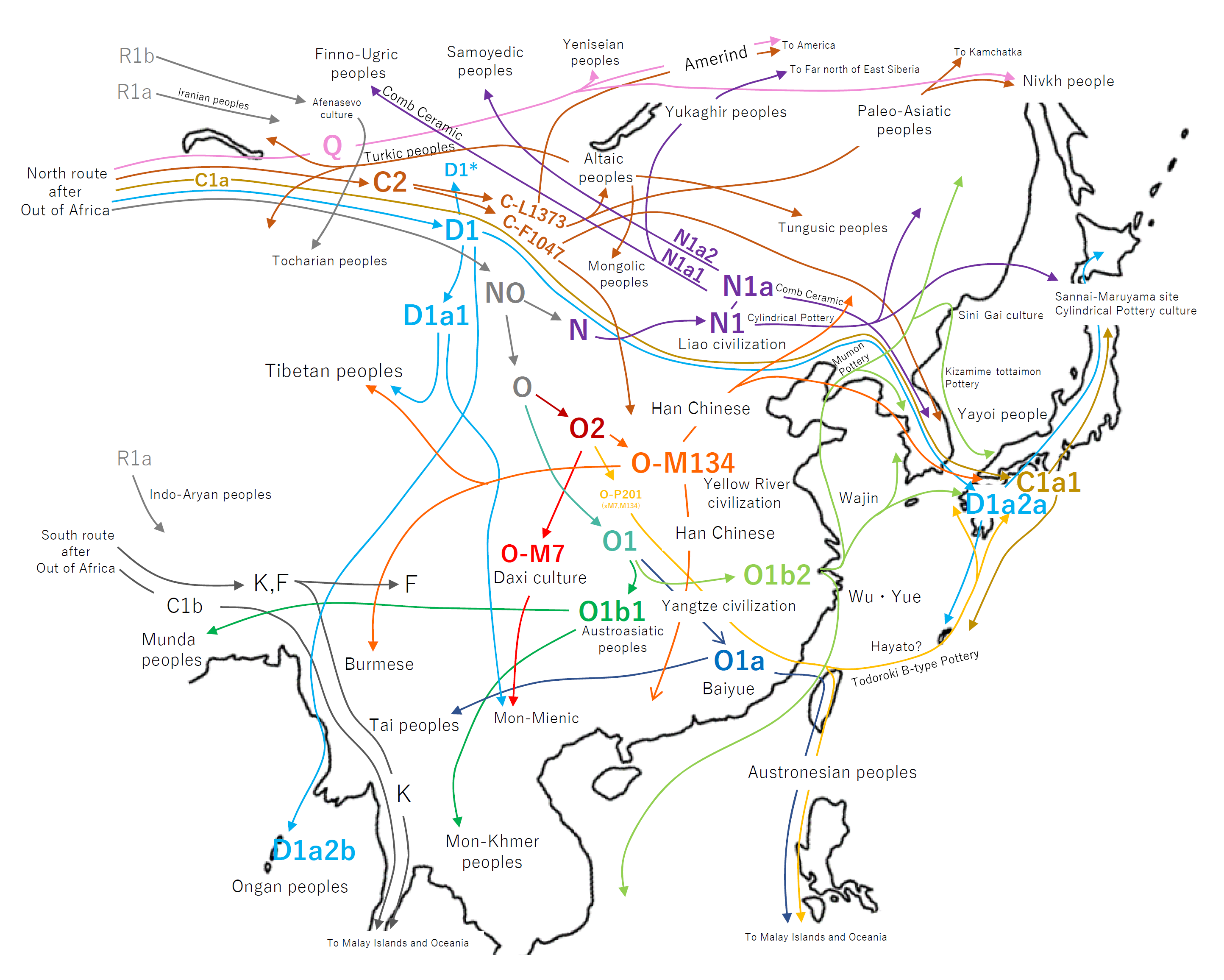
Y-DNA or patrilineal haplogroup migration map of East Asia, showing haplogroup O1a (O-M119), associated with Austronesian migrations

The Kadazan people, together with the Dusun, the Rungus and the Bajau are believed to have origins linked to the Austronesian migration known as the "Out of Taiwan" theory. According to this theory, the ancestors of the Kadazan were among the early Austronesian-speaking peoples who migrated from Taiwan thousands of years ago. These migrants, often referred to as the early Austronesians, gradually spread southward across the Philippines and into Borneo. Linguistic, genetic and cultural evidence supports this connection, indicating that the Kadazan share common roots with the indigenous peoples of Taiwan, such as the Paiwan and the Bunun. Over time, these ancestral groups adapted to the local environments of Borneo, giving rise to the distinct cultural identity of the present-day Kadazan community. A study has stated:

Over the next thousand years to 1500 BC, the Austronesians spread south through the Philippines to the Celebes, the Moluccas, northern Borneo and eastern Java. One branch went east from the Moluccan Island of Halmahera about 1600 BC to colonise eastern Melanesia (1200 BC) and Micronesia (500 BC). The migration continued well into Polynesia by 1 AD, and reached Hawaii and Easter Island by the year 500. The Austronesians finally reached the last uninhabited land on earth, New Zealand, sometime around 1300.

The origins of the Kadazan are closely tied to the broader Austronesian migration from Taiwan, as outlined in the "Out of Taiwan" theory. This theory is supported by linguistic, cultural and genetic links between the Kadazan and indigenous Taiwanese groups. The gradual southward expansion of Austronesian-speaking peoples over thousands of years, including their settlement in northern Borneo, laid the foundation for the development of distinct indigenous communities like the Kadazan. As these early migrants adapted to their new environment, they formed a unique cultural identity that continues to thrive in present-day Sabah.

=== Kadazan in the Nunuk Ragang legend ===
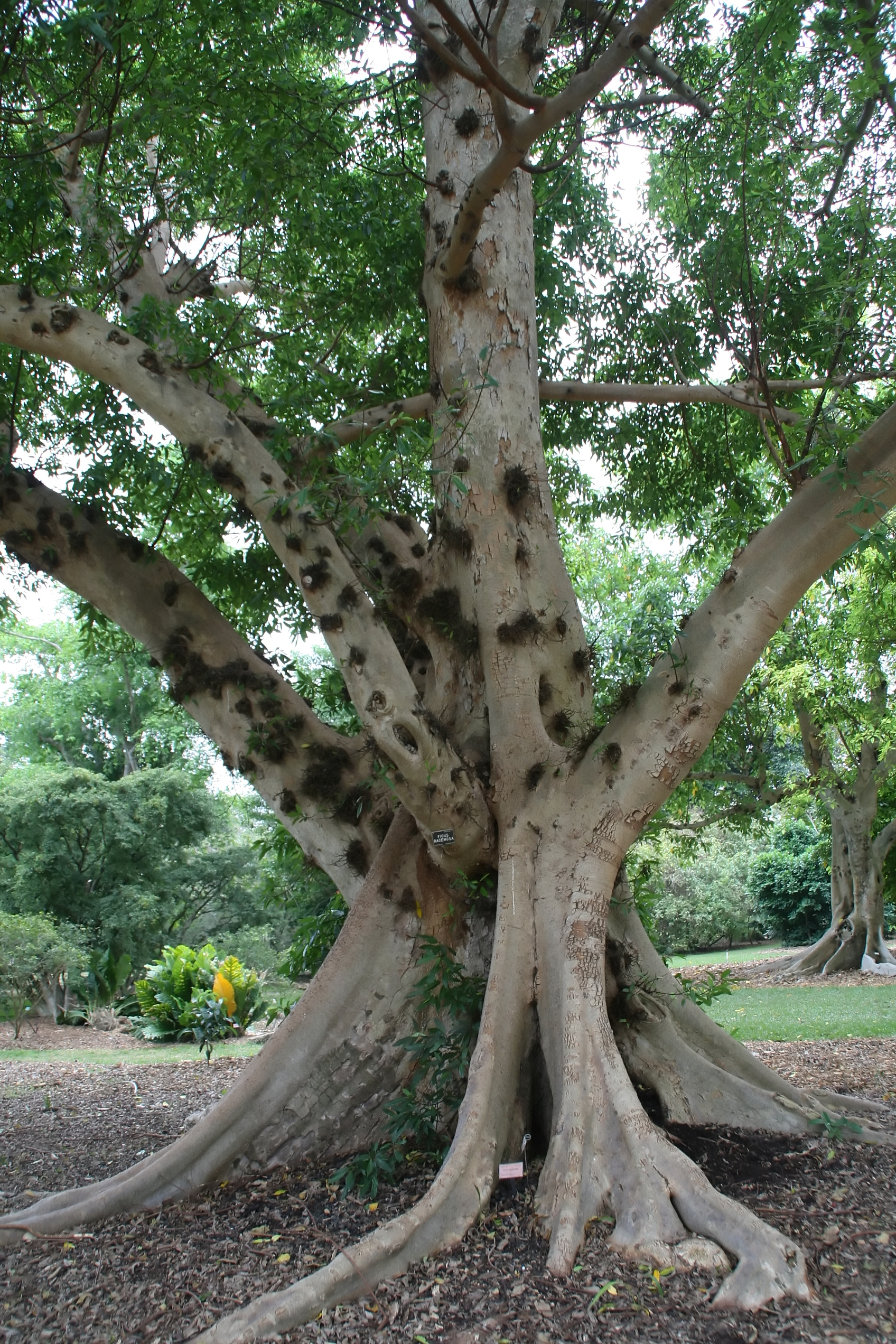
Ficus racemosa is associated with Nunuk Ragang, the putative origin of the Kadazan, the Dusun and the Rungus.

Similar to the story of Huminodun, Nunuk Ragang is a story that has been passed down orally, possibly by generations of bobohizan. The site of the tree is said to be roughly located in Kg. Tompios, at the confluence of the Liwagu and Kogibangan rivers, east of Ranau and Tambunan. Nunuk is the Dusun word for a type of fig tree, while ragang is derived from aragang, which means "red". The Nunuk Ragang tree looked like a giant mangrove tree with highly developed buttress stems with deep indentations, which provided good natural shelters. Nunuk Ragang, or the "red fig tree", measured six outstretched arms in circumference, with the top of its canopy estimated to be able to shelter seven joined houses, a house measuring 12 by 20 feet. Its numerous branches and giant thick foliage provided for ideal shelter and habitat for wildlife, birds, insects and spirits, according to local beliefs. It is believed that the roots of the gigantic tree produced a red exudate that had great medicinal value. In fact, the Nunuk Ragang's exudate is still used to treat rashes and other minor skin diseases in the modern era.

Evacuation from Nunuk Ragang due to the Minorit Push was decided through a meeting between the bobohizan and the people. The leaders made an agreement that the tagahas (lit. 'strong ones') were given the role of rear guards, while others were immediately leaving the place. River tributaries became their principal guidance for the direction of migration. Each group's direction of migration is guided by the flow of the Liwagu River. A bobohizan said that, had the people not moved out of Nunuk Ragang, they would not exist today. The Kadazan and the Rungus migrated out of Nunuk Ragang through the Labuk River. Both the Kadazan and the Rungus travelled northwards and later arrived in Tempasuk, Kota Belud, through the Marak Parak valley of Kota Marudu. This was where they made the decision to split, resulting in one group arriving in Matunggong and the other in what are now Penampang and Papar.

Prior to their separation, the Kadazan and the Rungus shared a settlement in Nunuk Ragang, an area that had the presence of white sand, or tangar-tangar, and was situated between two rivers, which they called pirungusan. Hence, the Kadazan were referred to as the Tanga or Tangara, and the Rungus derive their name from the word "pirungusan". Consequently, the Kadazan and the Rungus share similarities in their languages today because they once lived in the same village in Nunuk Ragang. As the Kadazan were establishing themselves on the west coast, they encountered the Bruneians and other settlers, with barter trade eventually developing through which the Kadazan had their gongs, copperware, brassware, silverware, necklaces and bangles.

=== Kadazan (Tangara) in the Rungus origin story ===
In the Rungus origin story of the entire Dusunic population, the population in Nunuk Ragang grew rapidly in the time of Aki Nunuk Ragang, the most well-known bobolizan at the time, for advancing the teachings of an animistic religion called Labus. He had three children; Rungsud (the ancestor of the Rungus people), the eldest; Longguvai (the ancestor of the Tangara people), (Note: In the Rungus version of the story, Aki Nunuk Ragang only had three children, namely Rungsud (the eldest), Longuvai and Turumpok, who remained in Nunuk Ragang. In the Kadazan's or Tangara's version of the story, Aki Nunuk Ragang is known as Aki Maragang and had sons named Runsud, Longguvai, Tomui and a daughter named Sayap respectively. The version of the name Runsud in Rungus is Rungsud, while Longguvai is Longguwai in Dusun, and Longuvai in Kadazan.) the middle child; Turumpok (the ancestor of the Dusun people), the youngest, who remained in Nunuk Ragang. The relationship between the Tangara and the Rungus was very close, not only because they lived in proximity, but also because one of the present-day Rungus sub-tribes called Rungus Gonsomon is related to the Tangara through Bulun, the son of Longguvai. When Longguvai migrated to Pampang (present-day Penampang), he developed a settlement within an area that would be highly developed and have several establishments and businesses. The Tangara, who lived close to these establishments, were referred to by the Rungus as tulun antad sid kakadazan, which means "people from the area of establishments". The Tangara also have ties to the people in Papar, Membakut and Labuk, and to the Gonsomon Rungus in Kudat. It is also believed that the Tangara have ties to the Dumpas, the Kunatong, the Mangka'ak, the Sukang and the Poruzou, found across the region encompassing Kinabatangan, Kuamut, Sugut and Tongod. The language of the Gonsomon Rungus is almost the same as that of the Tangara people, to the extent it is believed that the original language used before the separation of Rungsud and Longguvai was Rungus.

=== Nunuk Ragang as a metaphor ===
Nunuk Ragang can be seen as a central metaphor or a visionary account for the shared genesis of the Kadazan, Dusun and Rungus peoples. The legendary fig tree represents a common ancestral origin from which the three groups are said to have diverged. Its canopy is described as teeming with flora and fauna, symbolising the abundance and biodiversity of the world inherited by the descendants, while ancestral spirits and ghosts said to be dwelling within the tree embody the continued presence of forebears and the spiritual inheritance passed to each group. The red exudate, claimed to be released by the tree, is often interpreted as ancestral blood, a visible sign of kinship binding Kadazan, Dusun and Rungus despite later separation. In this framework, the trunk symbolises their unified linguistic and cultural root, while the outward branches correspond to subsequent migrations and adaptations; Kadazan communities to the western plains and coastal areas; Dusun groups to the interior highlands and river valleys; Rungus to the northern Kudat Peninsula. Differences in dialect, traditional dress and ritual practice are thus framed as regional variations of a single cultural lineage, with the tree's life serving as a metaphor for a shared inheritance that persists across geography and time.

== Culture and traditions ==
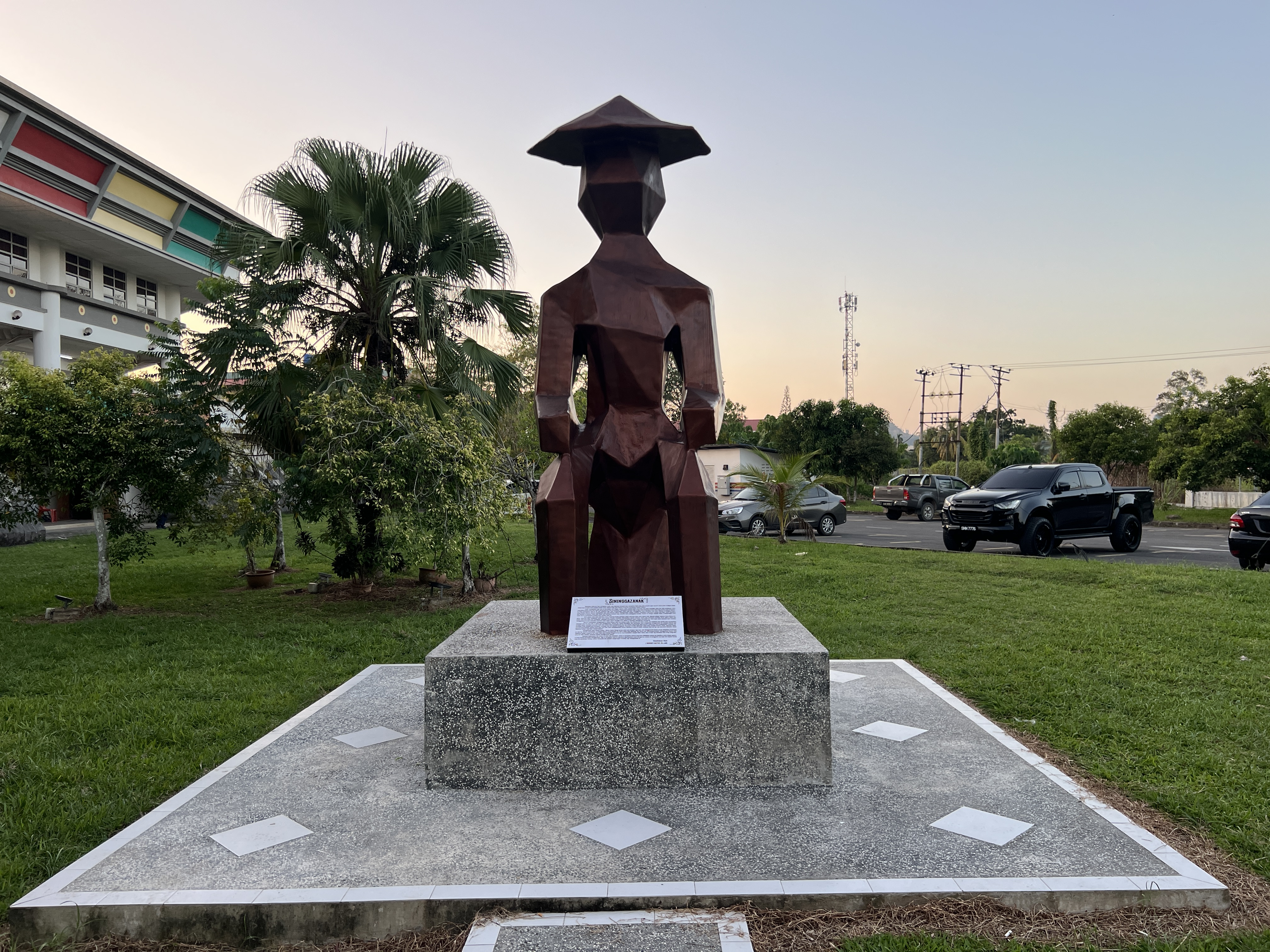
The Sininggazanak wood carving monument (also known as Tomboizu, Tinomboizu and Teningkianak) wood carving at the Sabah Cultural Centre, Penampang District. The Sininggazanak is a tradition that is only found in the Penampang–Kinarut area.

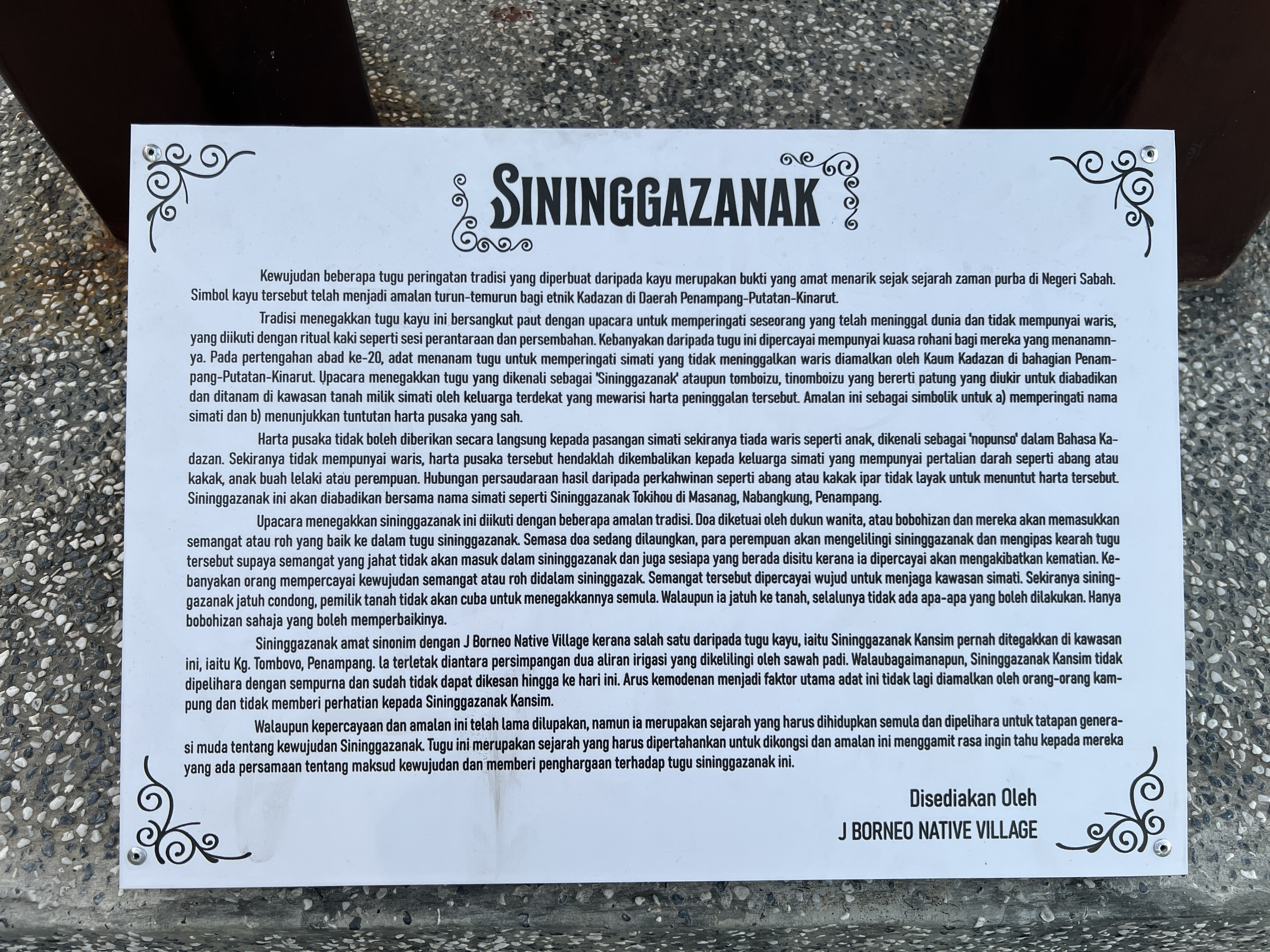
The inscription on the Sininggazanak monument, written in Malay

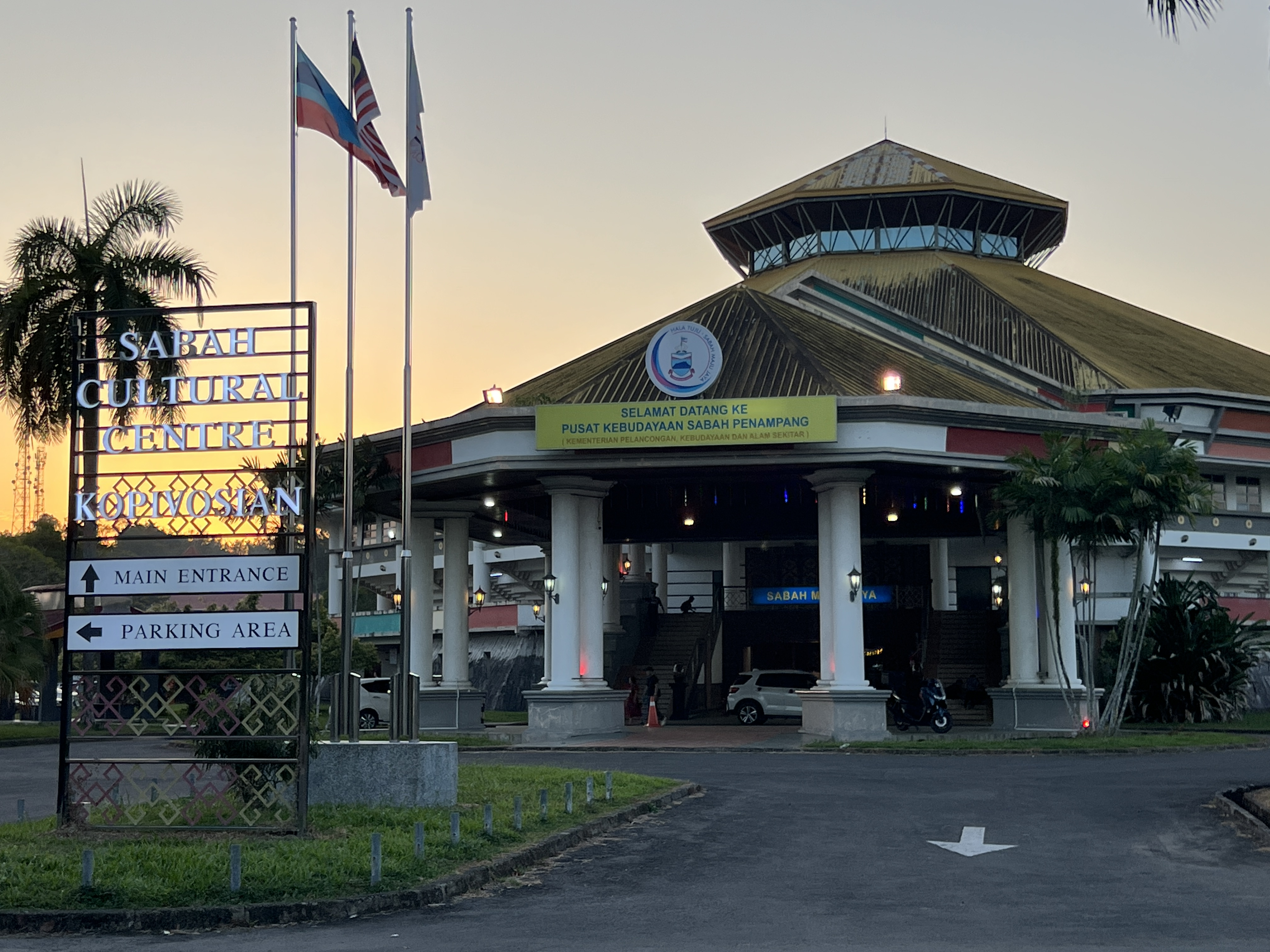
Sabah Cultural Centre in Penampang District, a multi-purpose cultural venue and landmark managed by the Sabah Cultural Board

=== Rice cultivation, Kaamatan and Unduk Ngadau ===
Kadazan culture is heavily influenced by their traditional occupation of rice farming, which is deeply intertwined with their spirituality, centring on a paddy spirit known as Bambazon and involving significant rituals performed by shamans called bobohizan to ensure an abundant harvest and protect the crops. This harvest is celebrated with a major festival known as Kaamatan, which honours the paddy spirit and gives thanks for abundance. The prominence of rice in both cuisine and rituals reflects its profound impact on the Kadazan identity, tradition and social cohesion, which also culminates in various delicacies and alcoholic drinks prepared through differing home-brewed fermentation processes. During the harvest festival, which takes place annually in May, the most celebrated event is a beauty pageant called Unduk Ngadau. Sumandak of Kadazan descent and others of Dusun, Murut and Rungus descent from different districts compete for this title at the Hongkod Koisaan Hall. The beauty pageant is held to commemorate the spirit of Huminodun, a mythological character of unparalleled beauty who is said to have given her life in exchange for a bountiful harvest for her people.

=== Monigup, langkum and moginggat ===
The use of sigup kirai and langkum is widespread among elderly Kadazan. Traditionally, men commonly practised monigup (smoking rolled tobacco wrapped in kirai, a wrapper made from the nipa palm), while women were more commonly associated with the use of langkum, a form of moist chewing tobacco placed between the gum and the lip or cheek.

Another traditional practice is moginggat, or betel chewing, which is practised by both men and women. The betel quid typically consists of sirih (betel leaf), pinang (areca nut) and kapur (slaked lime), sometimes with other ingredients such as gambier. These ingredients are combined and chewed, producing the characteristic reddish saliva associated with the practice.

=== Sininggazanak ===
Within the area of Penampang–Putatan–Papar, especially prior to the middle of the 20th century, there were widespread customs among the local Kadazan for commemorating a childless person. A wooden monument called Sininggazanak was usually erected on the land of a person who died without leaving a child to inherit his or her land; among the older Sininggazanak are the ones in Kg. Tampasak and Kg. Tanga of Kinarut in Papar District, in Kg. Tombovo of Penampang District, and in Kg. Kopuian and Kg. Sodomon of Putatan District.

=== Headhunting ===
In the past, some Kadazan men practised headhunting, which was driven by village wars and conflicts. There were instances of individuals volunteering as sacrifices for the community. It was only after heads turned into skulls that they became oracles for receiving protection. This is because the bobohizan believes that skulls have spirits attached to them, and these spirits are powerful. Hence, she performs the magang ritual, which pertains to skull appeasement. Oral tradition from the Penampang area recounts a warrior named Monsopiad who is said to have taken 42 heads. Unlike rogue headhunters, or pangait, who killed maliciously, Monsopiad was a protector. He beheaded 42 plunderers and warriors who attacked his village. Later in life, Monsopiad became a pangait, and he was subsequently killed.

=== Traditional dance and music ===
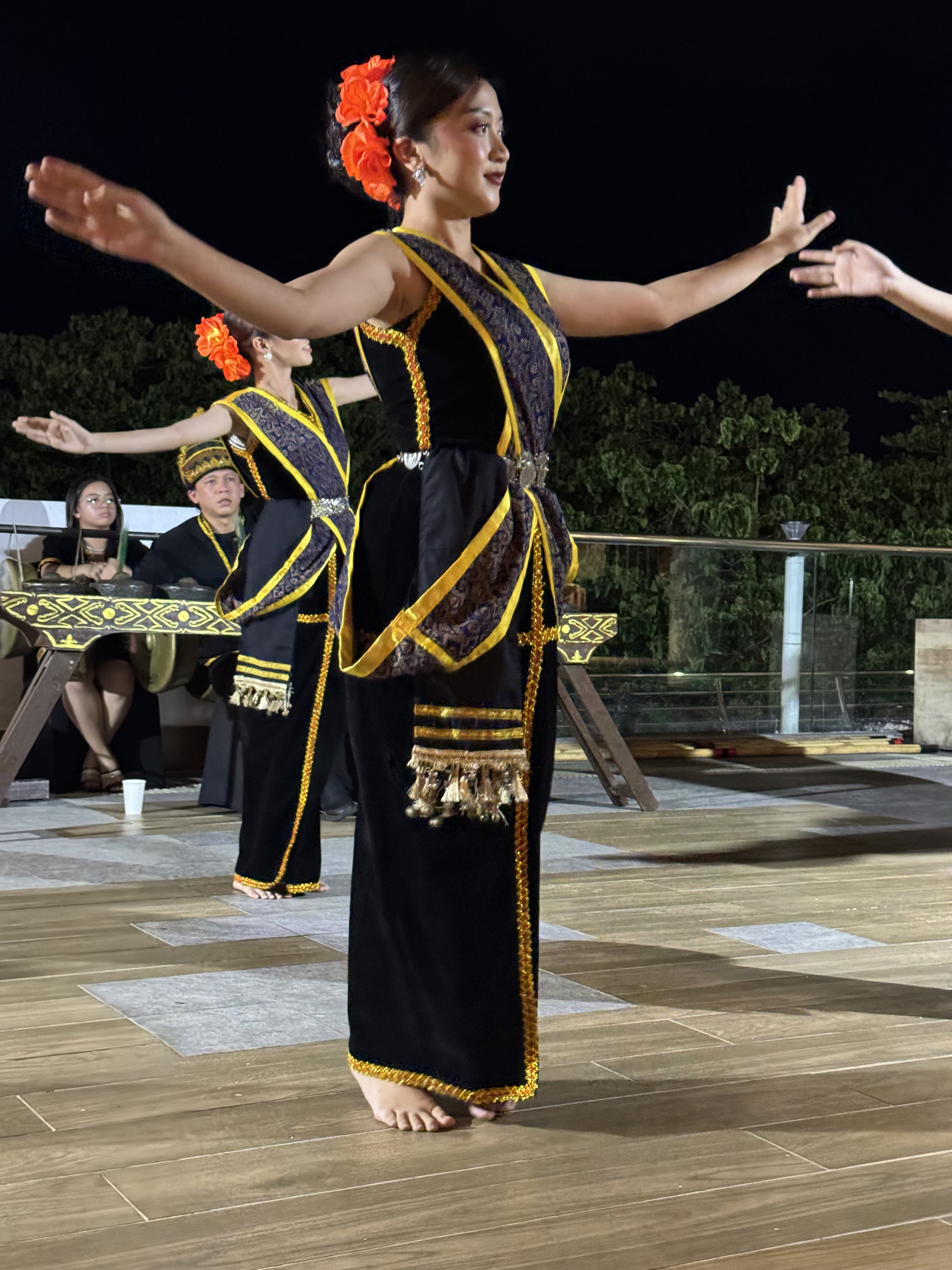
Dancers performing the traditional dance of the Penampang Kadazan, Sumazau Penampang

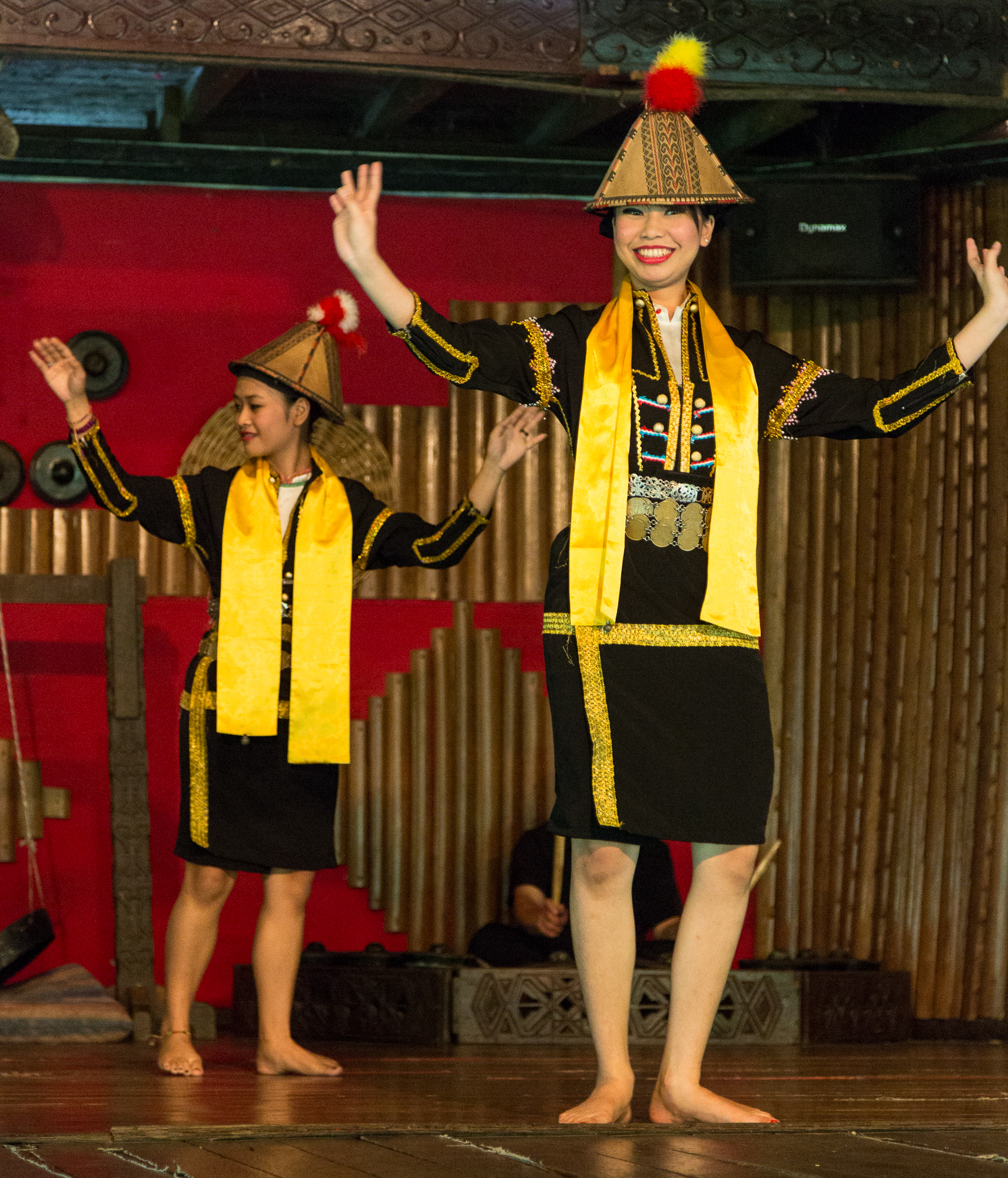
Dancers wearing the Papar Kadazan traditional attire and the distinct siyung

Sumazau is the name of the traditional dance of the Kadazan that is performed by a male and a female, sometimes by a large group, which is usually accompanied by a symphony of six handcrafted gongs, which are individually known as a tagung. A ceremonial sash is worn by both genders during the dance with gong rhythm accompaniment, which is typically performed in joyous ceremonies and occasions, the most common of which being a wedding reception. Sumazau exists in several localised forms across Sabah, with variations generally associated with the districts in which they are performed. Notably, it is known as Sumazau Penampang in Penampang, Sazau Papar in Papar, and Sazau Paina in Membakut.

One of the musical instruments associated with the Kadazan is the sompoton, an aerophone originating in Tambunan which is made from a dried gourd and bamboo. It is played by blowing into it, thus producing a soft and harmonious sound. Other musical instruments include the tagung and the kulintangan. According to an animistic Kadazan-Dusun legend, the earliest bobohizan were instructed by Huminodun in the practices of rituals, ceremonies, taboos and customs, including the art of instrument-playing and traditional Sumazau. Bobohizan in the era of Nunuk Ragang taught the people to fashion bamboo into various lengths, shapes and sizes and arrange them into an ensemble of six musical instruments, the seventh item being the gandang (drum). The bamboo instrument is known as the togunggak. The bobohizan also taught the people the rhythms of the togunggak such as magagung, botibas and dunsai.

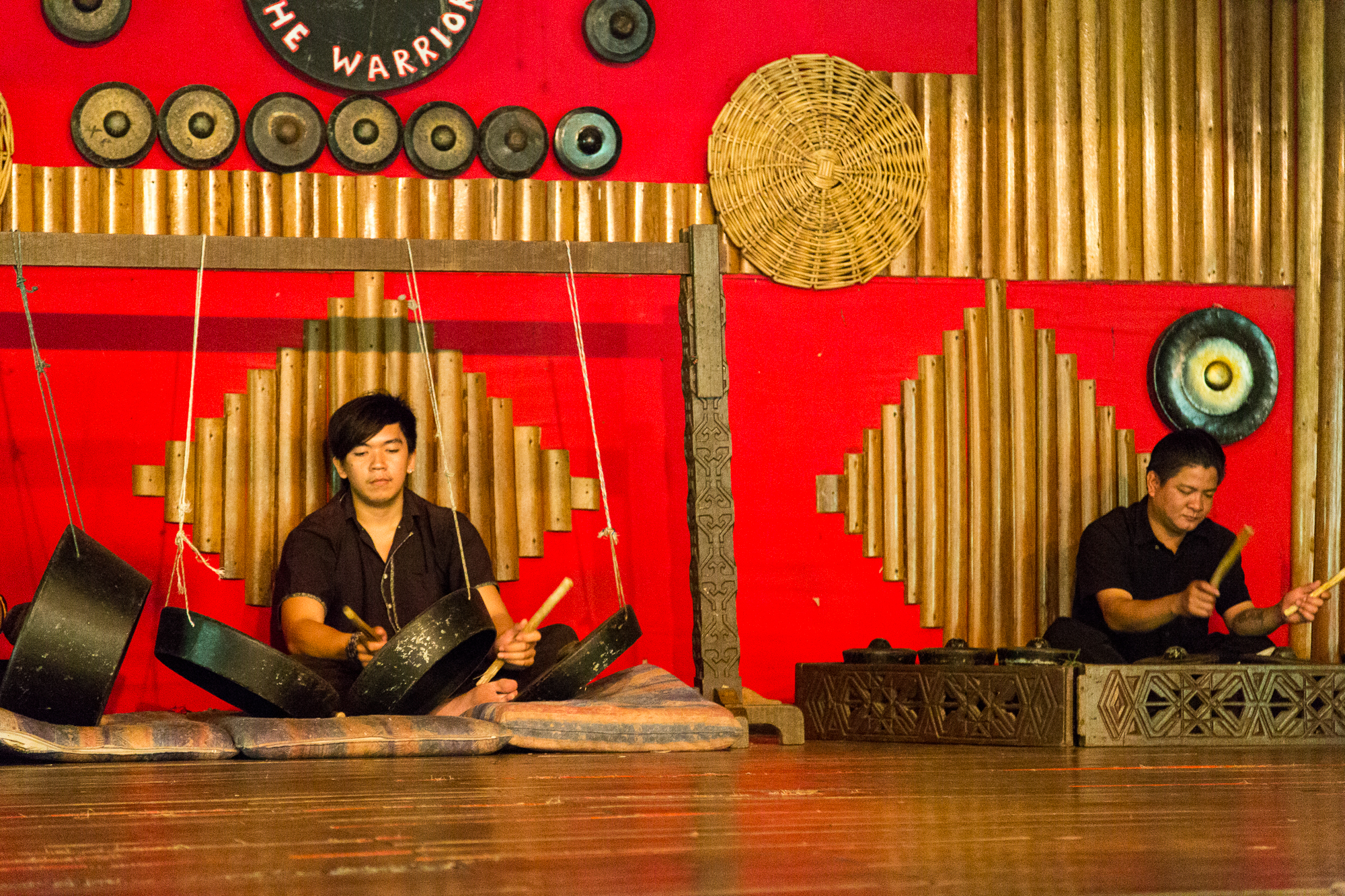
Tagung art at the Monsopiad Heritage Village, Kg. Kuai Kandazon, Penampang District

In the 18th century, when the west coast of Sabah was part of the Sultanate of Brunei, traders from Brunei introduced brass gongs. These instruments eventually reached the interior, and it became an invaluable cultural asset for all the indigenous peoples of Sabah. The Kadazan on the west coast were fascinated by these gongs, which were a novel and transformative experience for them; a community that held music and traditions in high regard, as they perceived the instruments to be elegant and the sound produced melodious. The gongs were soon acquired by them as personal belongings, and they were passed down as an heirloom. The tagung managed to replace the bamboo togunggak, and this major transition preceded the arrival of the British. Since then, the gong rhythms have been mastered and sustained for a variety of uses. As for wedding receptions, festive occasions and welcoming receptions for dignitaries, the rhythm of the tagung can be exhilarating, melodious and soothing. Sometimes, the botibas rhythm is performed as a variation. At funerals, the dunsai rhythm is very solemn and fearsome, serving as a symbol of respect for the dead. In the past, the sound of the gong was used for signalling emergencies.

Another musical instrument, the kulintangan, akin to the xylophone, would be played as an accompaniment to the magagung rhythm. The kulintangan is a set of nine gong chimes, and according to one's preference, it may be played along with the tagung to enrich the composition of the tagung. The latest types of gongs are made entirely of mild steel, or bosi, which are mainly produced in the district of Kudat. They are usually sold at a weekend market called a tamu, especially at Tamu Donggongon in Penampang.

=== Traditional attire ===
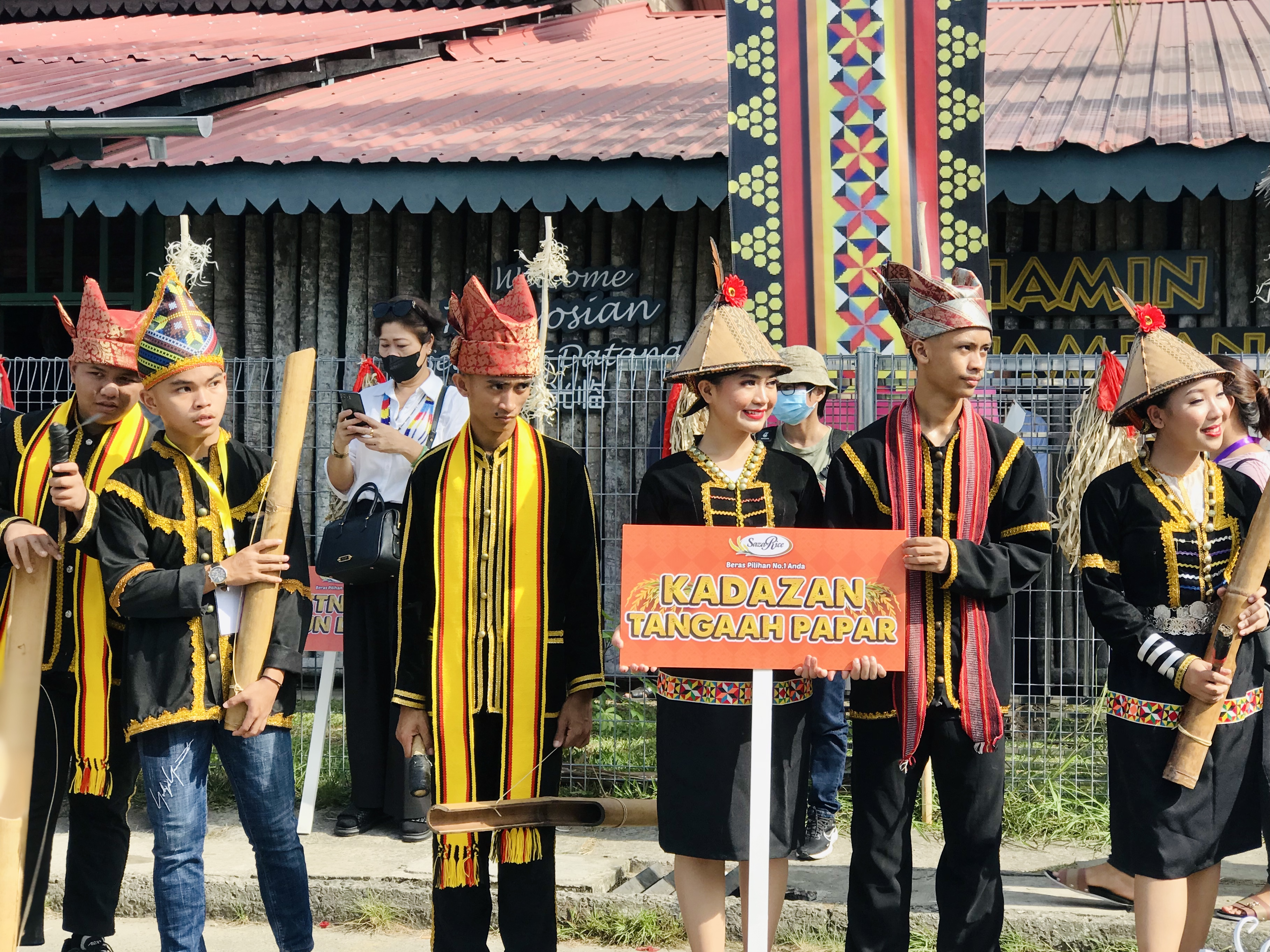
Papar Kadazan contingent at the KDCA Compound

Traditional Kadazan attire holds deep cultural significance, serving as a visual representation of status, identity and ceremonial function. The elegance and structure of the garments reflect not only indigenous values but also historical influences, particularly from the Bruneians, the Iranun and the British through trade. These influences are evident in the use of gold-coloured lace trimmings and accessories that are of foreign origin. The Penampang Kadazan and Papar Kadazan attires are different from each other, each incorporating unique tailoring, motifs and textiles that reflect local identity while preserving shared heritage.

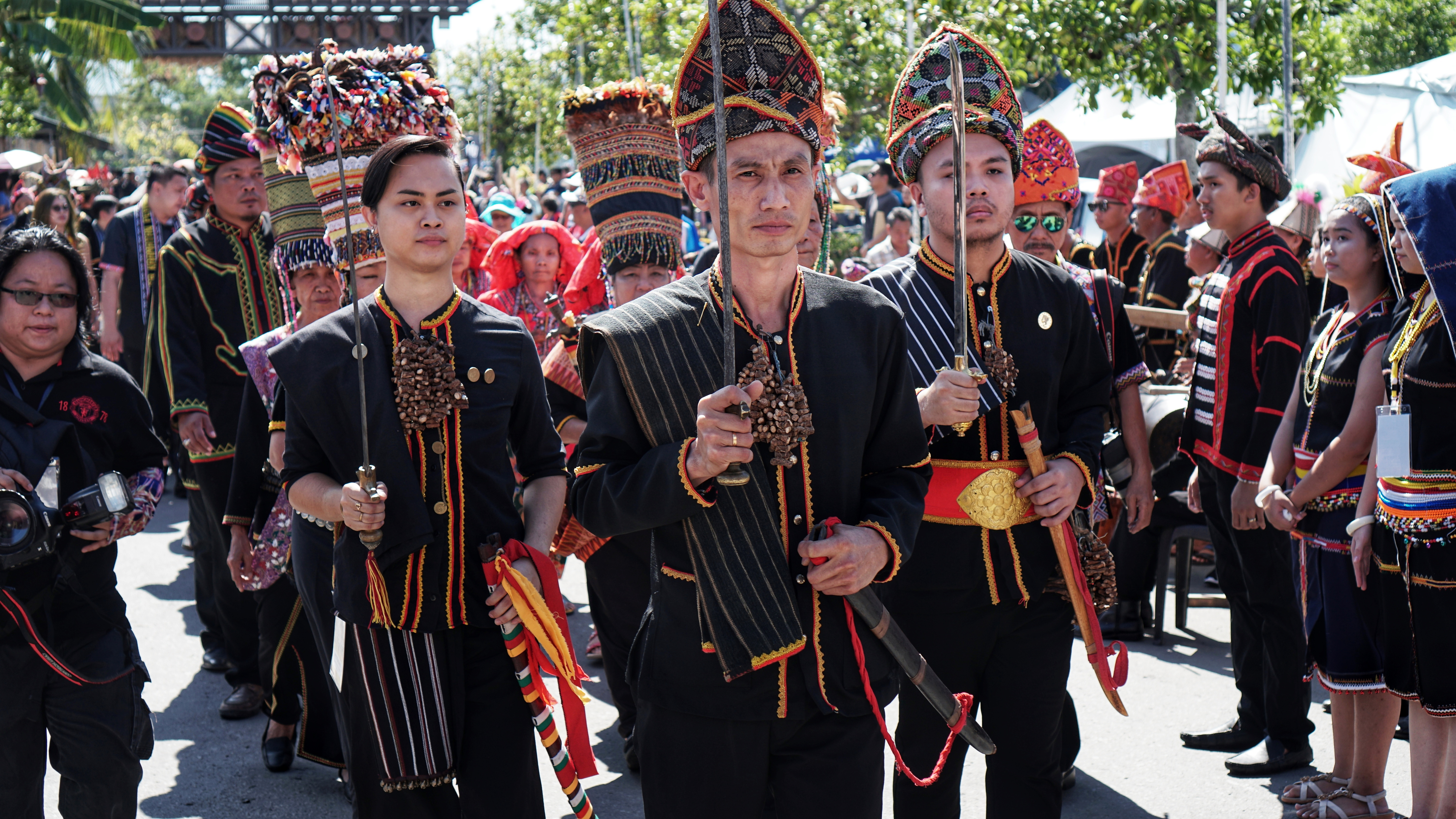
A Kadazan man wearing the sigah, a traditional male headdress of the Penampang Kadazan

The Penampang Kadazan women's attire consists of a blouse and a long skirt either made of black velvet or any black fabric, both decorated with gold-coloured lace trimmings. Their traditional attire is distinguished by age group, with variations in sleeve length and design. Young Penampang Kadazan women wear Sinuangga', which is sleeveless; the middle-aged women wear Sinompukung, characterised by three-quarter sleeves; the elderly women wear Kihongon, a long-sleeved garment that reflects their seniority. The two-piece gown is accompanied by British Trade Dollar belts known individually as a himpogot, a set of three brass girdles known individually as a tangkong, and other women's accessories that are usually made of brass or silver. The tangkong set is a prized heirloom, often inherited through generations, and it is considered a valuable cultural asset. Aged tangkong are especially sought after. Beyond their monetary value, tangkong are believed to act as a talisman for its wearer, offering spiritual protection to them during rituals and public appearances. The ensemble is further embellished with ornamental gold-coloured buttons (known as batawi among the West Coast Bajau), which were historically either plated or gilded with gold, a detail that once reflected the wealth and social standing of the gown's owner. These original buttons, now rarely found, mostly appeared on the earliest forms of the attire and are no longer widely available on the market. The women's attire is further adorned with two gold-alloy coins as a set of brooches called amas paun. These repurposed coins were extremely rare in their time, with the result that genuine amas paun are now hardly found in the market. The reproductions are often made of brass, which can naturally look like gold, or they may be gold-plated brass or base metal.

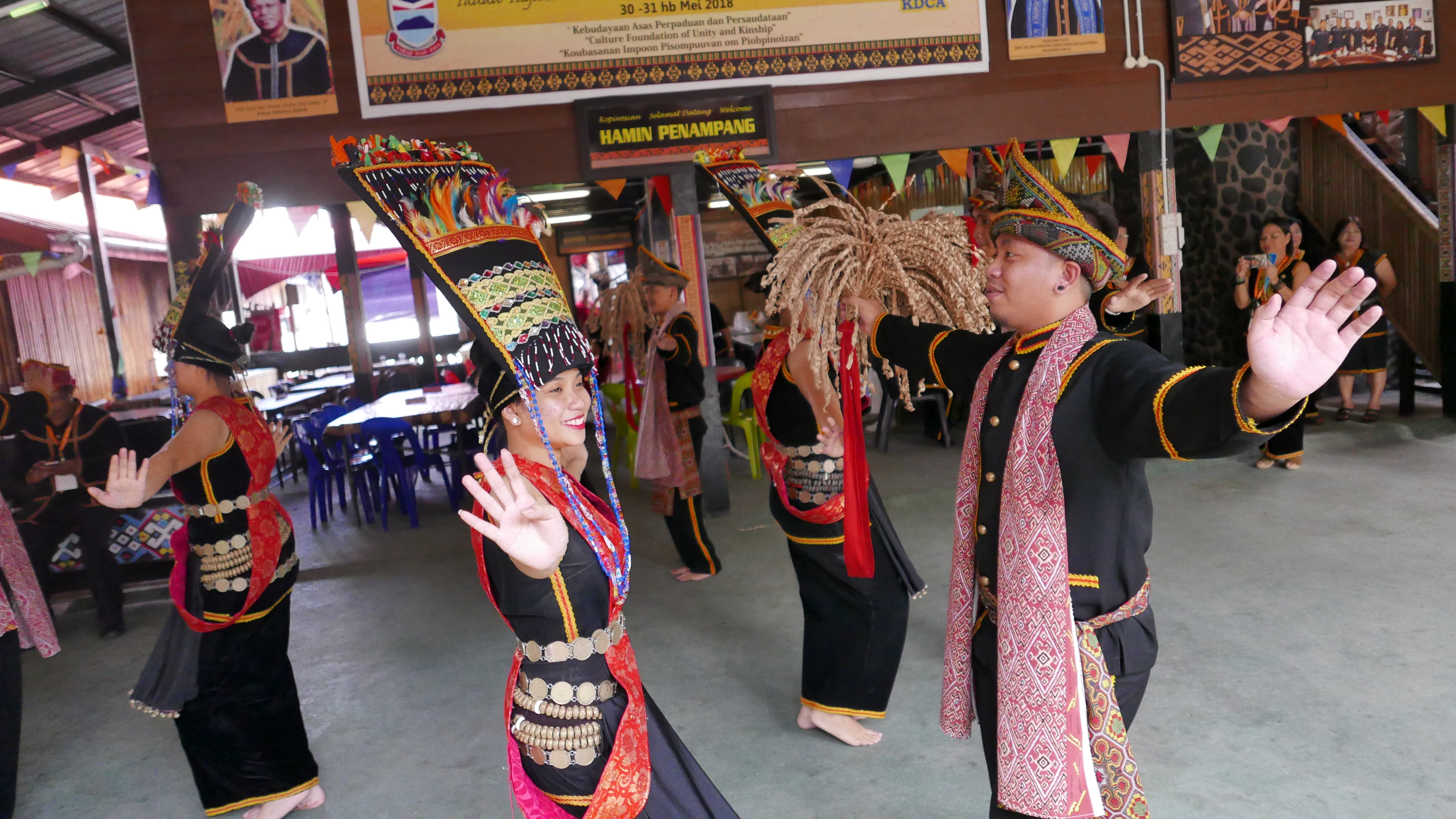
Dancers in the Penampang Kadazan attire performing Sumazau

In contrast, Kadazan women of Papar wear Siya' do Binoikian, which also features black velvet but with distinct tailoring and ornamentation unique to the Papar region. Papar Kadazan women wear an intricately embroidered blouse, or a siya', and paired with a short skirt, namely a gonob. The gonob features a colourful handwoven textile, or langkit, which is said to originate from Mindanao, Philippines, through trade interactions with the Iranun. The langkit has been successfully preserved by the Iranun, the Rungus and the Lotud Dusun on the west coast, while this crafted textile is either disappearing or no longer being produced on the island of Mindanao. Traditional silver-coloured jewellery like coiled bangles, or bolilit, and coin belts, called rupia', are commonly worn to complement the garment. Traditionally, the number of rupia' worn is in accordance with the marital status of the wearer; unmarried women wear four rupia', and married women wear two. Uniquely, this costume must be worn with an undergarment, or a siya' do sahom. The blouse is adorned with gold-coloured or silver-coloured buttons, or bamban (from the Tatana Dusun word kubamban), from the collar down the centre front. The costume is completed with an expensive and distinctive handwoven hat called a siyung. Unmarried Papar Kadazan women may be seen wearing a siyung with an egret feather on top, while the married women may be seen wearing one with a red flower. The modern version of Siya' do Binoikian uses synthetic feathers instead of a real feather. The white egret feather signifies the purity of an unmarried woman. The red flower on a married Papar Kadazan woman's siyung may signify her transition into, or blossoming into, adulthood and married life, gaining maturity. The flower may also be seen as a marker for respectability and customary restraint, a visual sign for her community; men who encounter her ought to acknowledge her marital status. The flower may symbolise the nature of a flower that "bears fruit", in the hope of her fertility and the continuity of her lineage within her newly founded family institution. On the other hand, the widowed and elderly women wear a plain siyung, which is a way of representing the fact that the family institution that the Papar Kadazan woman helped built has dissolved. Papar Kadazan women are known for diligence and practicality. Diligence is represented by the siyung, while practicality is represented by the soundung, a traditional headscarf worn underneath the hat.

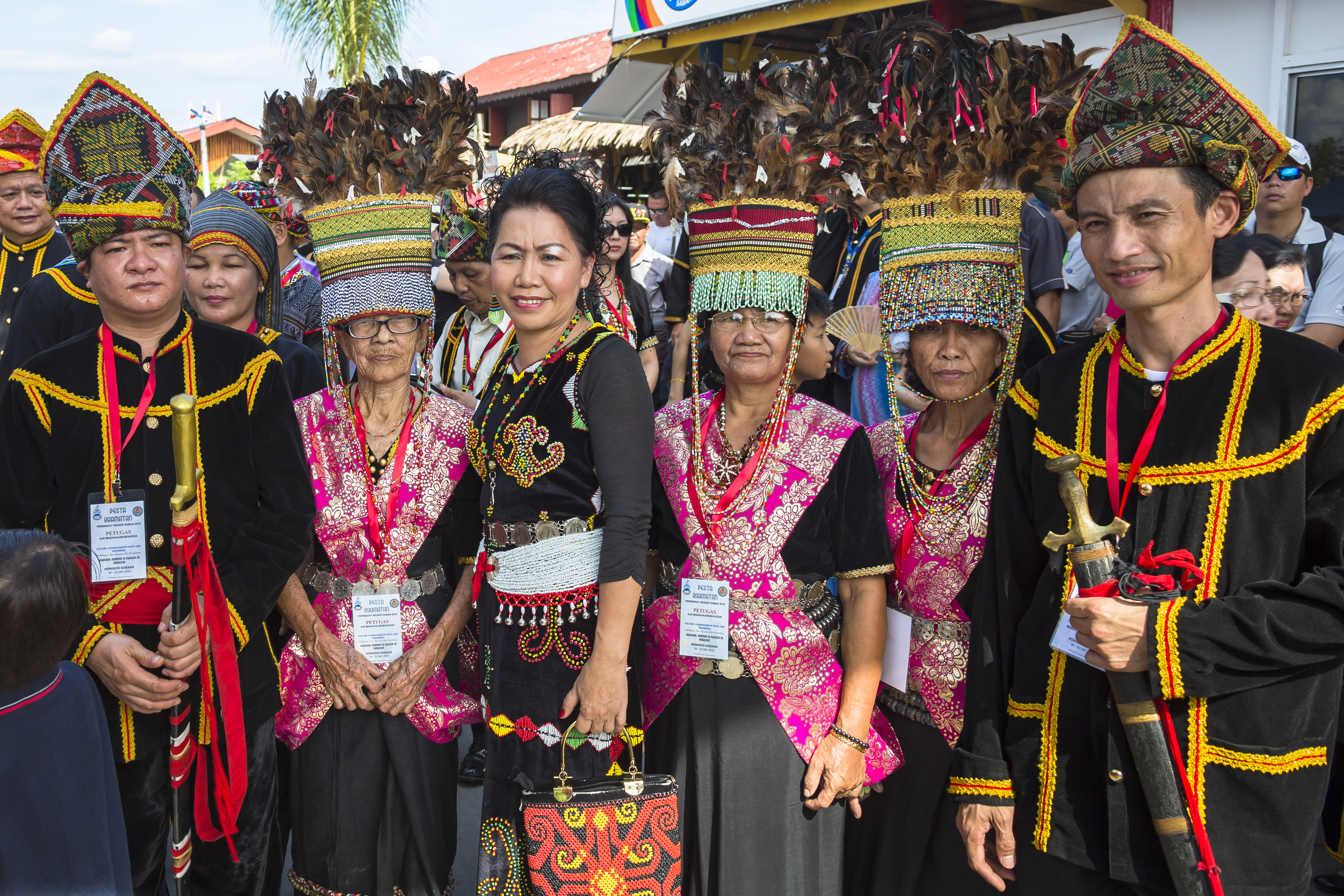
Joanna Kitingan, a former director of the Sabah Museum, with bobohizan in full attire during the opening ceremony of Kaamatan at the KDCA Compound in 2014

The priestesses of the Kadazan possess a high status, and this can be seen through their fashion. Styling themselves in such a manner serves to distinguish them from ordinary people and emphasise their elevated social position. Two husob, or sashes, are worn diagonally, crossing each other and forming a diagonal cross across the torso. The diagonal cross may signify discipline, responsibility and the weight of spiritual duty. The intersecting lines may also be seen as representing the interconnection between realms, the earthly and the spiritual, brought together through their role. They are visual reminders of their dignity, commitment and the sacred balance they help to maintain within the community. This manner of wearing sashes is similar to that of the Rungus, except beaded sashes are used, namely pinakol.

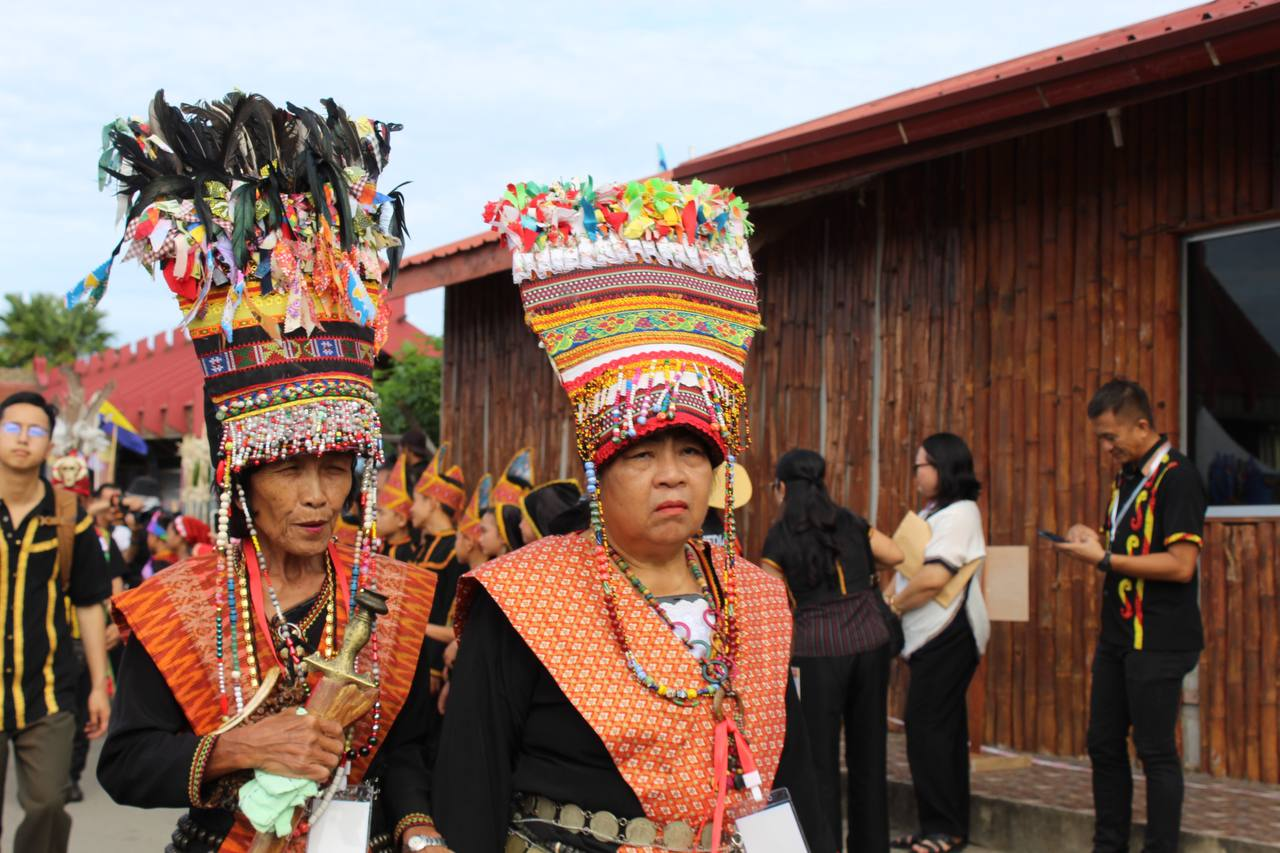
Penampang Kadazan bobohizan in full attire

The bobohizan dons a tall headdress called a sigah do bobohizan. The sigah do bobohizan is unique because it is only worn by Penampang Kadazan priestesses, and it serves as a symbol of identity of the Penampang bobohizan. It is made from an array of colourful cloths, and fabric scraps are attached to the headdresses, and among them are bird feathers, such as great argus pheasant feathers and rooster tail feathers, or andavi do tanda', to adorn the headdresses. The rooster tail feathers that curve downwards towards the earth are likened to healthy, full paddy stalks, reflecting the Malay proverb "the fuller the paddy stalk, the lower it bows", a way of expressing that success comes with humility. The fabric scraps attached to the tips of the rooster tail feathers represent Bambazon, the paddy spirit. The headdress is adorned with strands of multicoloured beads. Its imposing height and intricate detailing mark her elevated status within the community. More than a cultural or decorative item, the headdress functions as a ritual object used by the bobohizan during ceremonial practice. It is consecrated through incantation before being worn, marking its activation for ritual use. It also serves as an indicator that the ritual specialist has entered a formal ceremonial role during ritual activity. In addition, it is regarded within the ritual context as a symbolic medium associated with ancestral and spiritual recognition during ceremonies.

The sigah do bobohizan is often worn during major ritual ceremonies, such as magang and magavau. One of its functions was to receive the return of warriors from war in the past, but, in the present time, it is worn to receive the arrival of dignitaries. In the past, the headdress was only rightfully worn by a bobohizan. In the present era, it may also be worn by ordinary people, but with the condition that they follow proper protocol. It is permissible to wear the headdress to receive dignitaries or perform Sumazau to showcase Kadazan heritage, but it is deemed unethical to wear it for purposes that have no connection to customary ceremonies. The sigah do bobohizan is considered sacred by bobohizan because it holds spiritual potency. When intending to wear it, a bobohizan will recite an inait, or a mantra, to awaken the spirit within the headdress before putting it on. In other words, wearing a sigah do bobohizan for pageantry or arbitrary purposes is advised against because the sigah do bobohizan is a symbol of the stature and dignity of the Kadazan bobohizan. The bobohizan's attire is a ceremonial ensemble that functions primarily as a visual expression of ritual authority and spiritual role within Kadazan-Dusun tradition. It is designed as a structured system of clothing that signifies her transition from ordinary social identity into a sacred intermediary state. Collectively, the components of the attire establish immediate visual recognition of the bobohizan's sanctioned authority, reinforcing her role as a mediator between the physical and spiritual realms during ceremonial practice. In May 2026, Sabah Bobolian Organisation (Pertubuhan Bobolian Sabah) issued a formal objection against the unauthorised commercialisation of the Bobohizan attire, stating that the ceremonial headdress, in particular, is inherently sacred and must not be used for modern fashion showcases or pageants.

Kadazan men wear matching gilded black velvet attire called Gaung Boludu (from Malay baldu). It is a shirt-and-pants set, worn with a sash called a kaking and a headdress called a sigah, and the sigah is made of Iranun textile. In many indigenous or traditional costumes, the color, material, and draping of a waistcloth signify specific social status, tribal affiliation, marital milestones, or festive roles. In the past, the sigah was made only from local fibre, until cotton became mainstream in the 1900s. The attire represents their cultural identity, status and masculinity. Boludu is worn for major cultural events such as Kaamatan, rituals and weddings.

=== Marriage ===
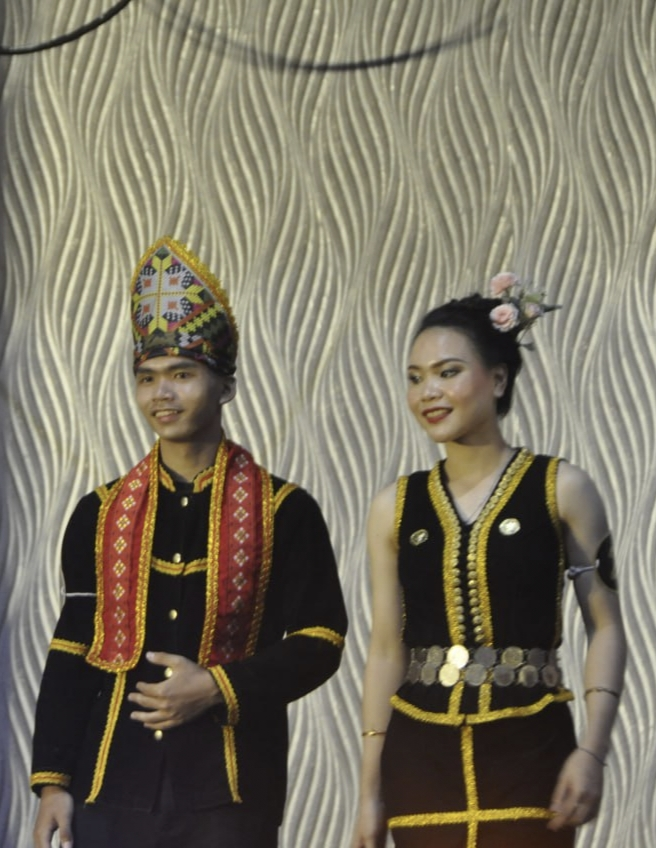
A man and a woman wearing the Penampang Kadazan traditional attire at a cultural show; wearing matching traditional attire as a couple is a well-established tradition in Kadazan weddings

In traditional Kadazan marriage, a bride price (known within the Penampang Kadazan community as a nopung), which is colloquially referred to as a "dowry", is given to the bride's family. In Penampang especially, an elaborate negotiation is scheduled between the groom's family and bride's family. As a traditional gesture of respect and civility, on the day of the meeting, the bride price is metaphorically laid out using matchsticks on a flat surface, and representatives from each side push and pull the sticks across an imaginary boundary so as to denote the bargaining of the bride price. The bride price traditionally consists of water buffaloes, pigs, sacks of rice and small jars of tapai (ethnic rice wine). Some families give a full set of tagung and large engraved jars known as tajau. This was more common in the past, as these traditions are deemed antiquated, and the items are now considered extremely rare. Modern bride price negotiations mainly focus on cash and land title documents, and the negotiation includes wedding costs, with any additional expenses beyond the total amount of the bride price to be paid by the bride's family. Kadazan women of Penampang and Dusun women of Keningau, Ranau and Tuaran districts are widely regarded as having the most expensive bride prices. Based on the customs of the Kadazan, a ritual called miohon pinisi is part of the traditional wedding ceremony, with miohon carrying the meaning of "exchange", while pinisi is a little lump of cooked rice. The tradition of miohon pinisi is a symbolic gesture of the beginning of a new life for the married couple.

Marriage between individuals with close familial ties is strictly prohibited as part of the customs and norms of the Kadazan community because it is believed to attract misfortune to the couple, their families and the broader community. While it was traditional for a Kadazan to marry within their kampung, or village, or at least a neighbouring village, a decline in xenophobia over the past few decades has eased the difficulty once associated with interracial marriage, with Kadazan marrying Muslims mandated to convert to Islam under Malaysia's state-level Sharia legal system. Such unions often led to outrage and rejection from families, and they are known to fiercely divide the traditional Kadazan community due to perceived threats to their identity. Since the 1960s, the religion of Islam was exploited as a political means to increase the Muslim population in Sabah. (Note: The control of Sabah by indigenous parties was weakened since the 1980s due to internal divisions and the entrance of West Malaysia-based parties that began to damage the region's balanced social and religious demographics. Further, millions of Muslim immigrants, mainly from neighbouring Indonesia and the Philippines, were brought into Sabah, which further shifted political power away from indigenous peoples, which disregards what had been promised earlier through the 20-point agreement of the Malaysia Agreement, especially in the context of religious freedom when Islam was controversially designated as Sabah's official religion through the attempts of the third Chief Minister of Sabah, Mustapha Harun, in 1973.) Ruling Muslim political parties had openly extended political and economic privileges to Kadazan Christians who converted to Islam, as well as to the non-Christians, in the hope that the non-Muslim community would embrace the latter religion, while maintaining a strict and permanent disregard for the 20-point agreement that forms the basis of the Malaysia Agreement for those who wish to return to their former religion. The resultant controversial demographic shift has, in those years, further compounded the dwindling numbers of the Kadazan-Dusun community and consequently made it more challenging to preserve the culture and heritage, while contributing to an increase in Islamophobic views on the latter religion.

== Cuisine ==
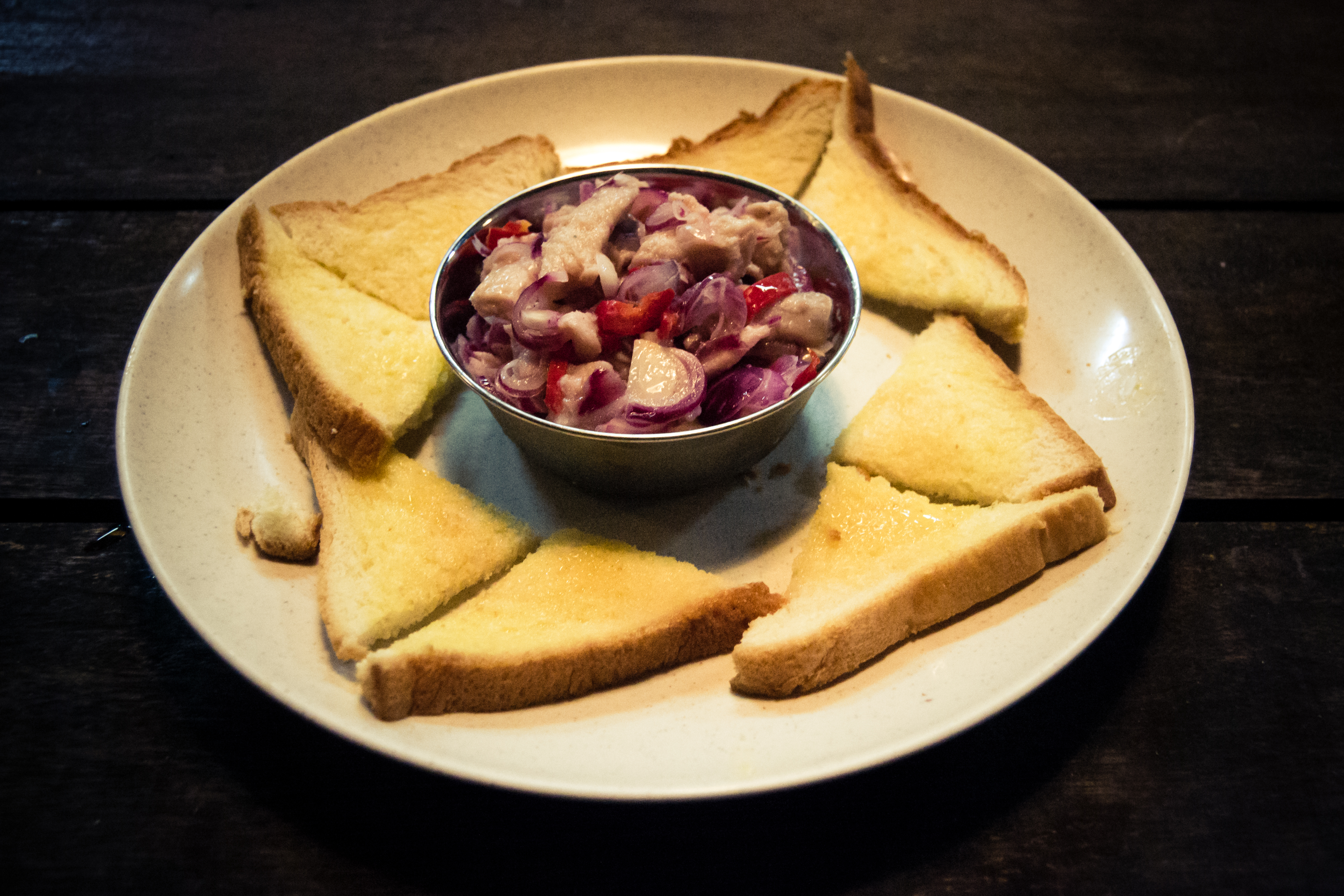
A swordfish hinava served with bread

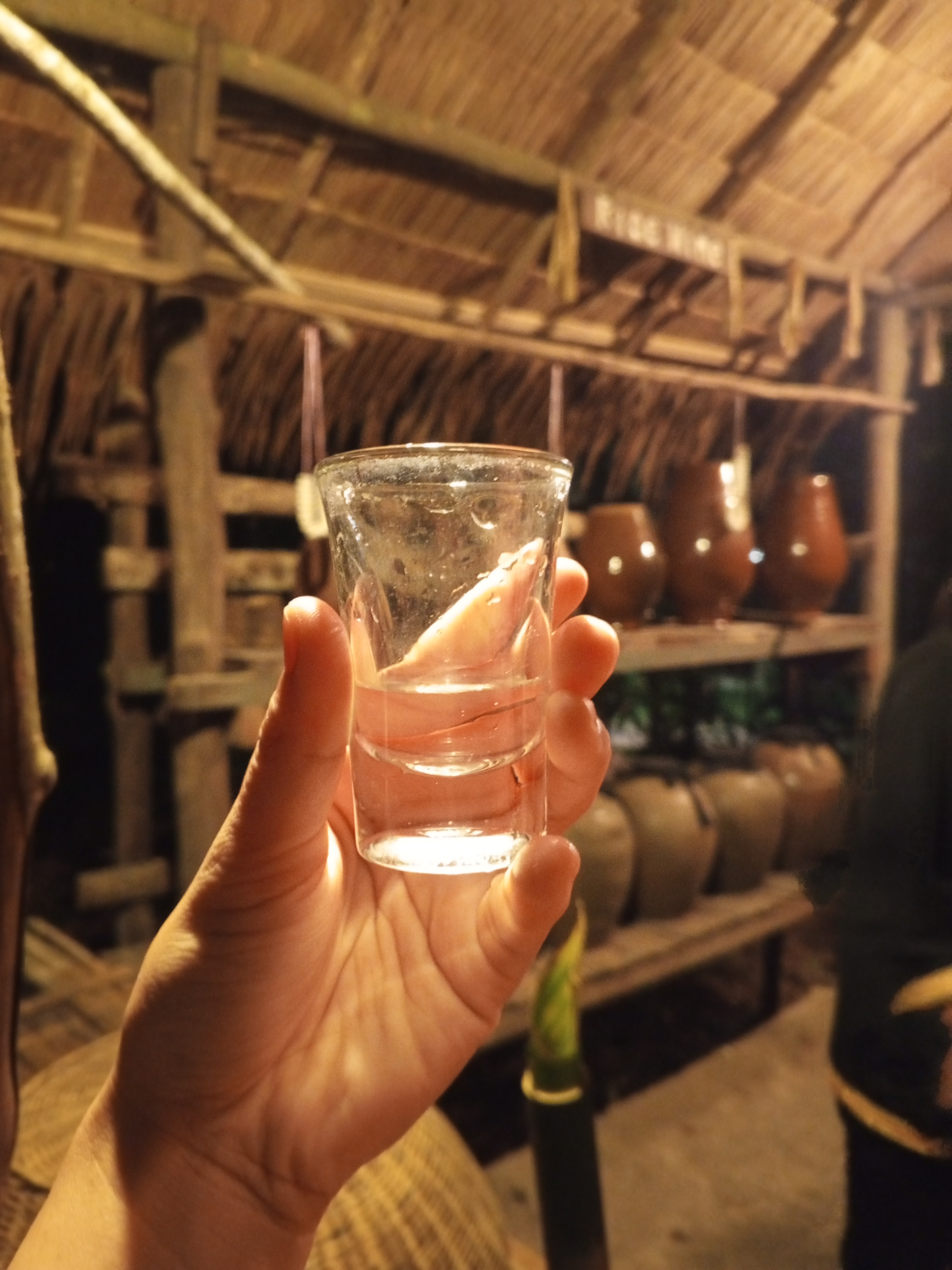
Montoku', a hard liquor commonly associated with the Kadazan

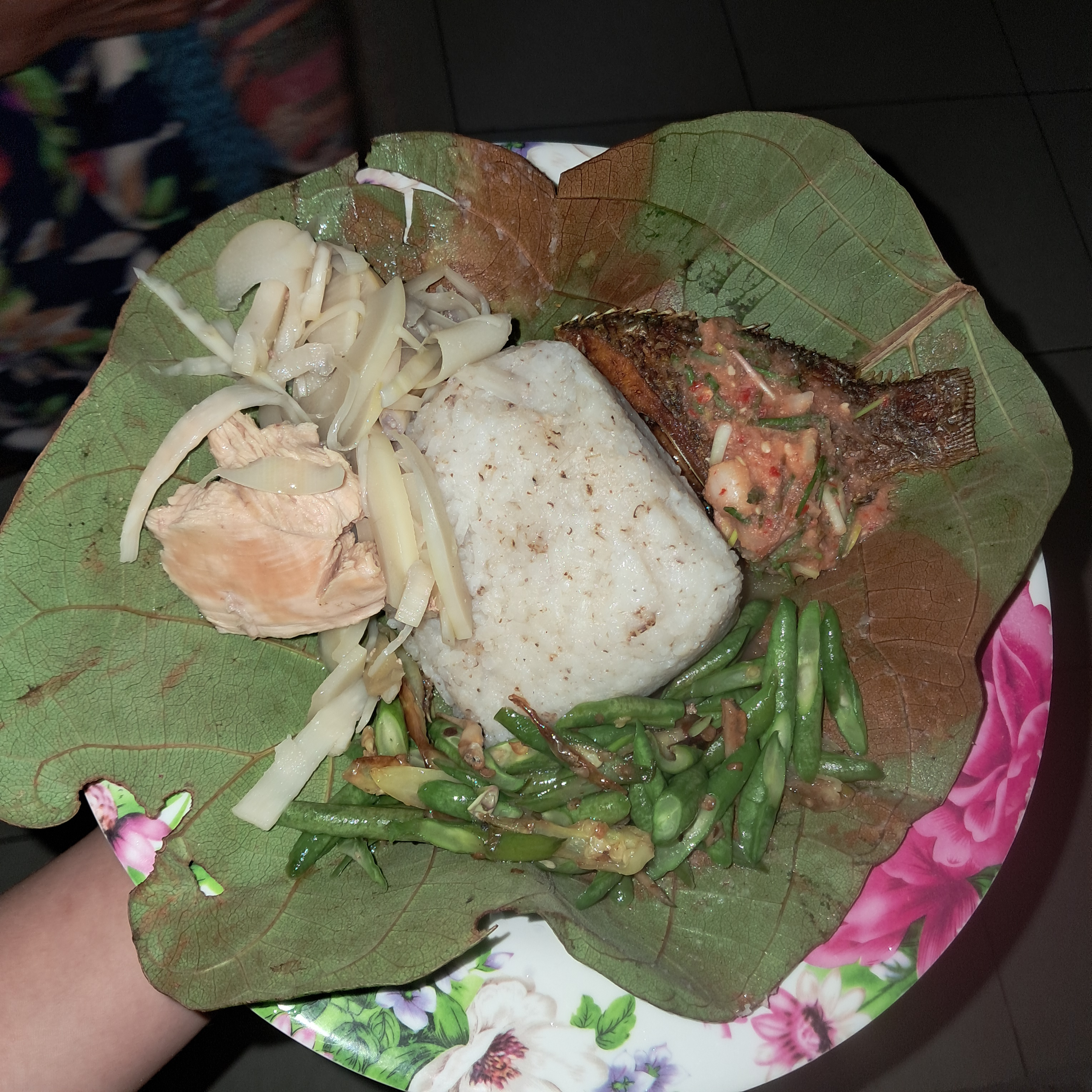
Linopot, a rice dish popular among the Papar Kadazan

Traditional Kadazan cuisine mostly involves braising, grilling or boiling, which employs little oil, and with locally unique modifications and nuances as well as the particular use of locally available organic ingredients, particularly wild mango, taro, ginger, lemongrass and calamansi. Contemporary Kadazan food has been influenced by Chinese, Malay, Filipino and other native cuisines as well as international trends, and often sees the use of traditional ingredients interpreted in new and novel ways. For example, bambangan is available as an ice cream flavour. Chicken lihing soup, or sup manuk nansak miampai lihing in the Kadazan language, is popular among Chinese and Kadazan communities alike. Lihing is also used in marinades, local variants of sambal relishes and is used as a flavouring for stir-fried noodles. Tangy and pungent flavours from souring agents or fermentation techniques are key characteristics of Kadazan cuisine, as seen in dishes such as nonsom, pinongizan, hinava, and liniking. Kadazan comfort food ranges from a simple side dish like tinutuk mangga (Note: Tinutuk mangga is a salad similar to Filipino ensaladang mangga. Tinutuk mangga is made with unripe mango, and it is mixed with shrimp paste, dried anchovies, shallots, chillies, calamansi juice and salt.) to a variety of pickled foods collectively known as nonsom. Hinava tongi, a dish which is similar in concept to South American ceviche, is a salad of raw Spanish mackerel marinated in citrus juice, ginger, onion and grated bambangan kernel. The grated kernel has a similar texture to the strands of desiccated coconut flesh. This dish is served at certain Sabah coffeehouses and restaurants, especially those that offer traditional Kadazan menus.

Nanggiu is a refreshing traditional treat of Kadazan sweet dessert, close to Malay air batu campur (ABC), cendol, Filipino samalamig and Vietnamese chè thái. Nanggiu is made from sago pearls cooked in sweet coconut milk with fragrant pandan leaves. Hinompuka' is the most well-known Kadazan confection, it is a rice cake made from glutinous rice flour mixed with palm sugar, the mixture is wrapped in banana leaf and steamed until fully cooked. The use of banana leaf does not only help retain moisture but also impart a subtle earthy aroma to the dessert. With its rich, chewy texture and sweetness, hinompuka' remains a cherished delicacy among the Kadazan community, often served alongside other traditional snacks during various social events, particularly festive gatherings and celebratory occasions. Its rich flavour and cultural significance make it a popular treat at birthday parties, weddings and communal feasts. The Kadazan of Papar are known for their hininggazang and pinompol, or pinompo, a snack made from sago flour with sliced bananas, grated coconut and sugar; the latter is a sweet and soft snack with a crusty fried texture and is mixed with sago powder and sugar, usually mixed with cheese, mayonnaise or banana. Another popular traditional dish is pinasakan sada', a preserved fish stew commonly made using saltwater or freshwater fish, typically small species. The fish is braised for hours with takob-akob or tulod-ulod (unripe bilimbi), along with turmeric, salt and sometimes grated tuhau. Pinasakan sada' is one of the most common dishes associated with the Kadazan, with several versions such as pinasakan sada' sapat and pinasakan sada' bambangan. It is known for its distinctively sour and slightly oily flavour, and is usually eaten with plain rice as a staple accompaniment. The most prominent pinasakan sada' dish is pinasakan basung, a mackerel scad dish. It is also prominent among the Dusun in Ranau, Beluran and Sandakan. Pinasakan basung is extremely popular that many Kadazan people eat it daily. Due to the mackerel scad being widely available and inexpensive, it has become a staple food among less privileged Kadazan people across Sabah.

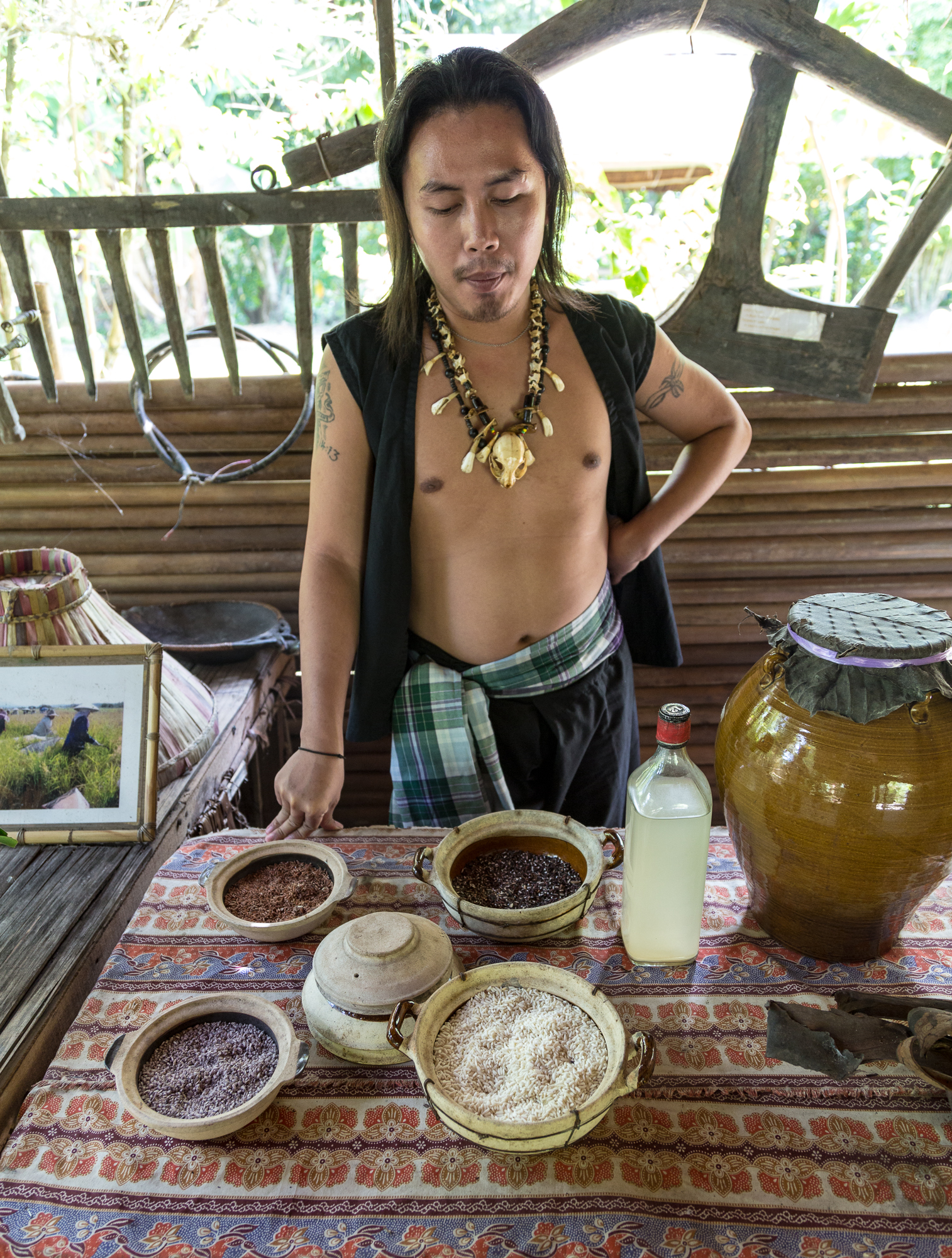
A staff member at Monsopiad Heritage Village showing the different types of rice that are used to produce lihing, talak (another name for montoku'), and tapai

One of the most well-known Kadazan side dishes is bambangan, which is a traditional dish made from wild mango native to Borneo, and it is especially popular among the Kadazan. It can be eaten fresh or marinated. The marinated version is nonsom bambangan, it involves salting the flesh of the wild mango and mixing it with the strands of its grated kernel, then storing it in a small container to ferment over time. This process gives it a strong, tangy aroma and flavour, with the dish typically served as a side dish with rice and meat. Bambangan is an essential part of Kadazan communal meals and festive occasions. Tuhau, which originated in Tambunan, Keningau and Ranau, is a fragrant and pungent traditional dish made from the stems of Etlingera coccinea, dubbed "Bornean wild ginger", a plant native to the forests of Borneo, which is commonly prepared as a salad by finely slicing the stems and mixing them with chillies, salt and lime juice. Alternatively, it may be marinated in vinegar and salt, where it is often served as a side dish. It is valued not only for its strong aroma and distinctive taste but also its cultural significance in Kadazan cuisine. A delicacy of the Kadazan known as butod is commonly served during special occasions, with recent modern infusions incorporating sushi and pizza served at Kadazan restaurants and coffeehouses across Sabah. Sinalau vogok, often sold at roadside stalls, is known for its smoky flavour. It is made of regular pork (different from wild boar meat sinalau bakas), usually dressed with soy sauce or chilli sauce, and it is often served with rice or as a snack. As a result of the ban on wild boar hunting activities in Malaysia, regular pork has become the substitute for sinalau bakas, though the actual sinalau bakas may still be sold in the interior of Sabah. Another variant of sinalau bakas, or smoked wild boar meat, is sinalau bakas panggang, which is sinalau bakas grilled for immediate eating. For barbecue flavour enhancement, the Kadazan traditionally use a basting method with sogumau, brushing it over the meat. The bulb of the sogumau is beaten, typically using a mortar and pestle, until it frays into bristles. These bristles release natural fragrant oil, which is then evenly applied to the meat as it barbecues.

The Kadazan people are also renowned for their lihing, a traditional sweet rice wine that plays an important role in their cultural and ceremonial life. It is brewed using glutinous rice and natural yeast called sasad, which initiates fermentation over several weeks. The resulting beverage is mildly alcoholic, golden in colour and has a distinctively sweet, aromatic flavour. Lihing symbolises hospitality, prosperity and spiritual connection with the ancestors and is one of several varieties of indigenous rice wine found in Sabah, but lihing is particularly associated with the Kadazan community of Penampang and surrounding areas. Montoku' is the only distilled liquor produced by members of the Kadazan-Dusun community. This beverage is made from the rice wine tapai through the process of distillation, and it is more potent than lihing. The drink is traditionally brewed using time-honoured methods passed down through generations. While it was once widely made in rural households, montoku' has become increasingly rare in modern times due to stricter alcohol regulations, declining interest in traditional brewing and the growing preference for commercially available European beverages among younger generations, such as red wine and beer. Nonetheless, montoku' continues to be served on ceremonial occasions as a symbol of heritage and communal identity.

== Religion ==
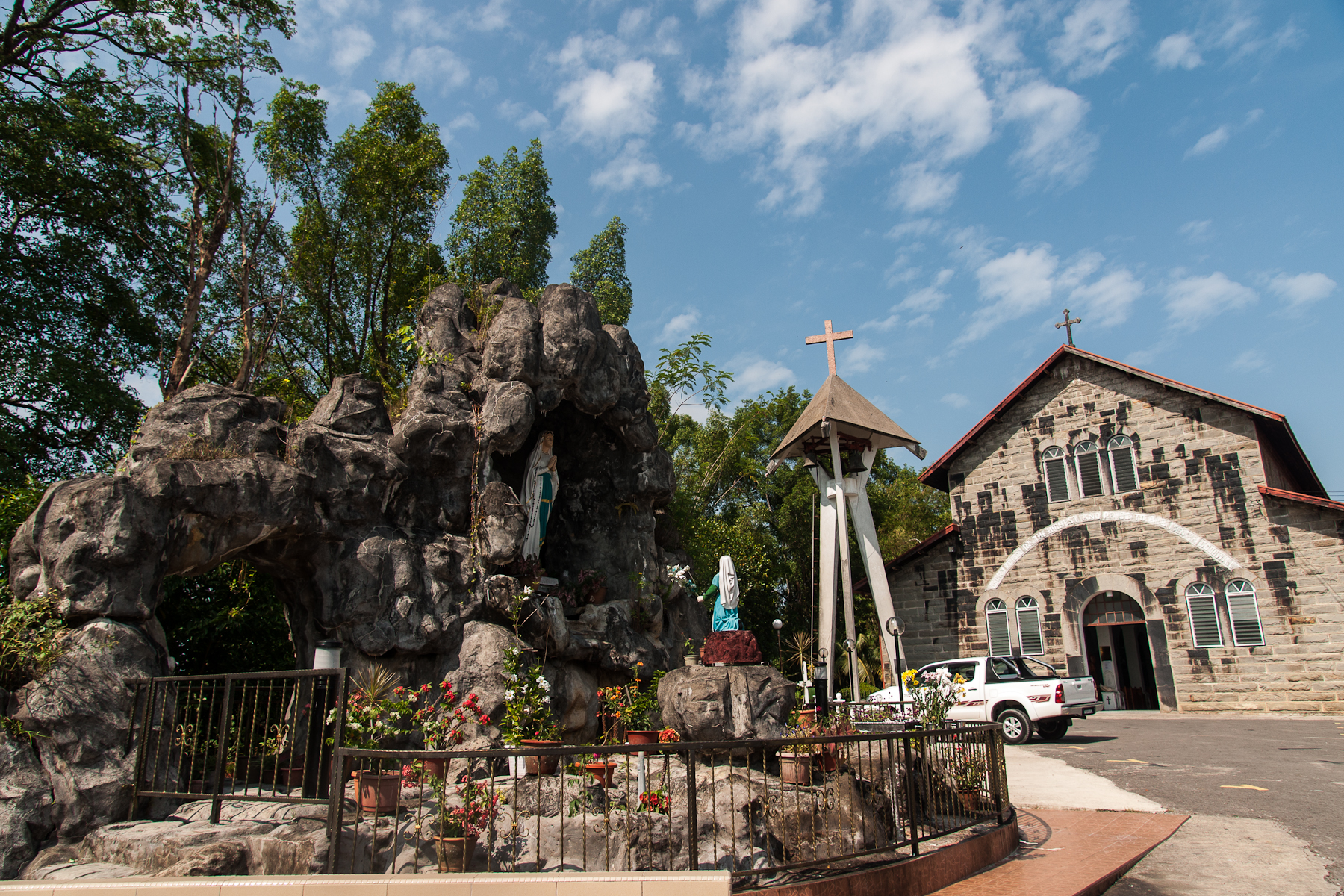
St. Michael's Church, a Catholic church of Penampang District

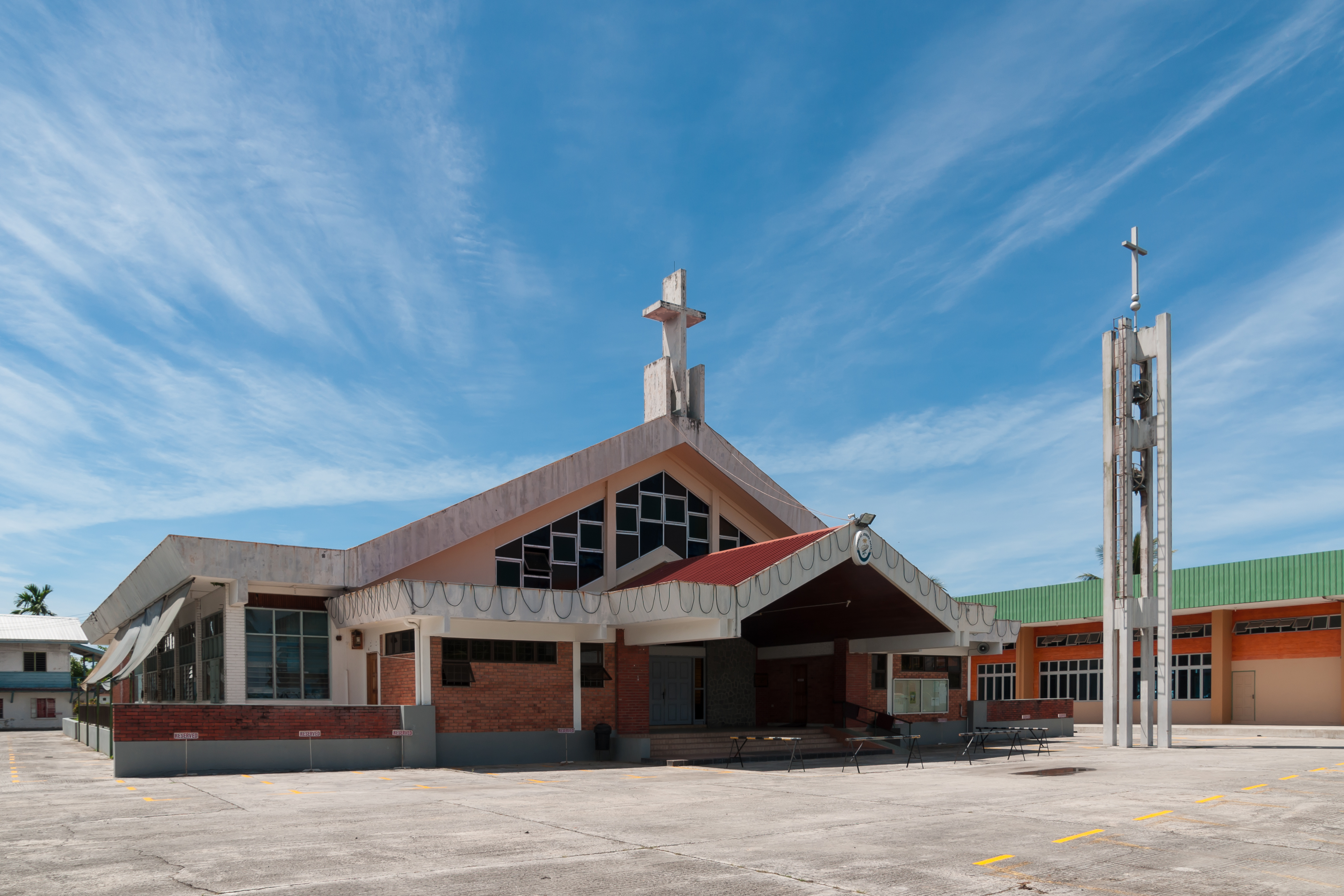
St. Joseph the Worker, a Catholic church of Papar District

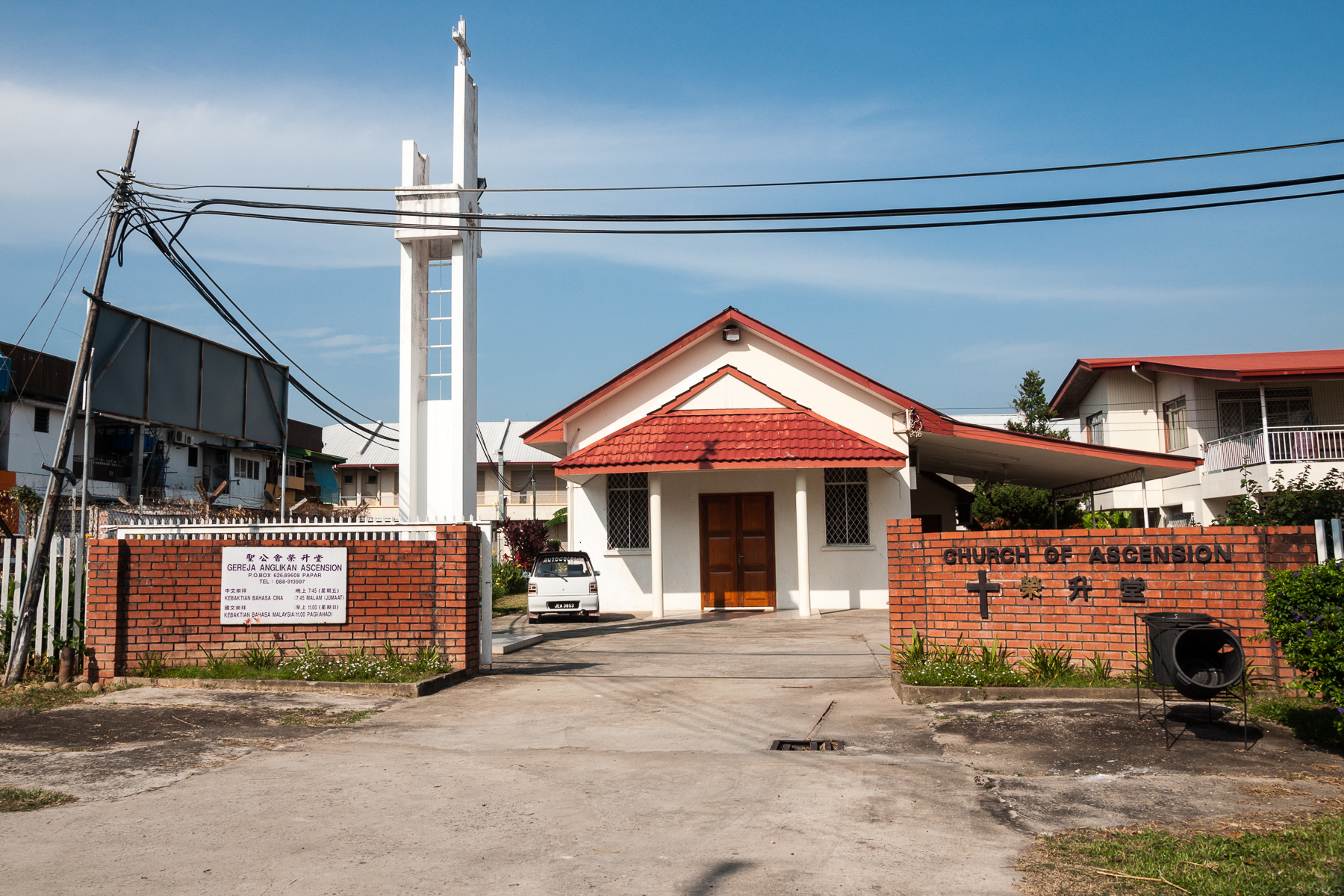
Anglican Church of Ascension, an Anglican Church of Papar District

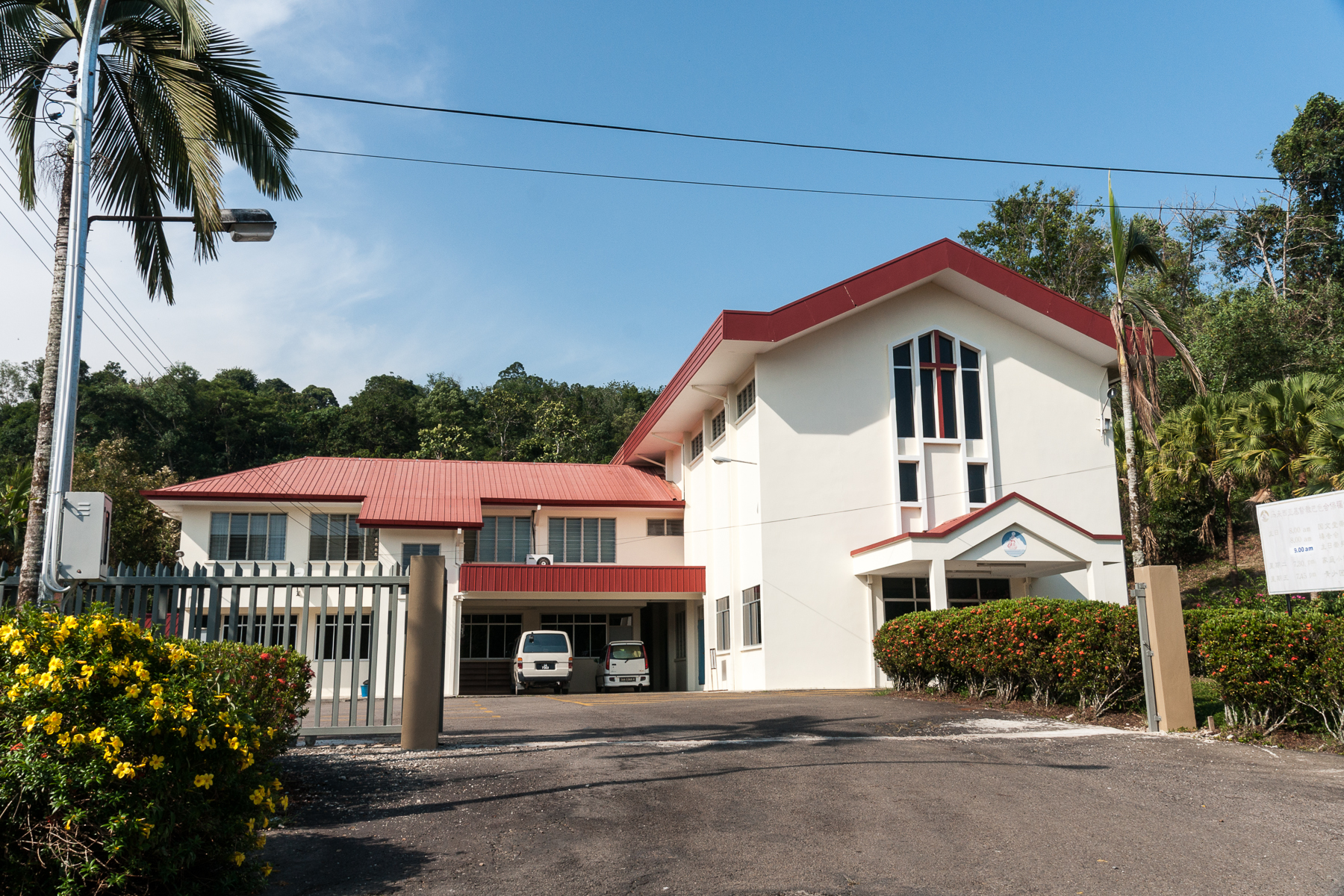
Basel Christian Church of Malaysia, a Lutheran Church of Beaufort District

The most prevalent Christian denomination among the Kadazan is Catholicism, with only a small number belonging to other denominations.

The majority of the Kadazan areCatholic Christians, with some Protestants mainly from the Anglican and Lutheran section. Islam is also practised by a minority, especially those who have intermarried with people from among Muslim-majority ethnic groups such as Bruneian Malay, Bajau, Bisaya and Kedayan. Prior to their conversion to Abrahamic religions, the dominant belief system among the Kadazan was Momolianism, which gave rise to many local customs, with some scholars equating it to animism. It was the predominant belief system prior to the arrival of Christian missionaries during the British North Borneo administration in the 1880s, especially the Mill Hill Missionaries. The Protestant influence is due to later British influence in the 20th century. The animistic Kadazan belief system centres around a single omnipotent deity known as Kinoingan. Rice cultivation is the centre of Kadazan life, and thus various rituals and festivals are celebrated and revolve around paddy cultivation. The annual harvest festival of Kaamatan is essentially a thanksgiving ceremony and the most recognisable festival attributed to both the Kadazan and the Dusun, a tradition rooted in a harvesting ritual called magavau. For each harvest, a tribal priestess, or a bobohizan, performs two different rituals; one before and one after.

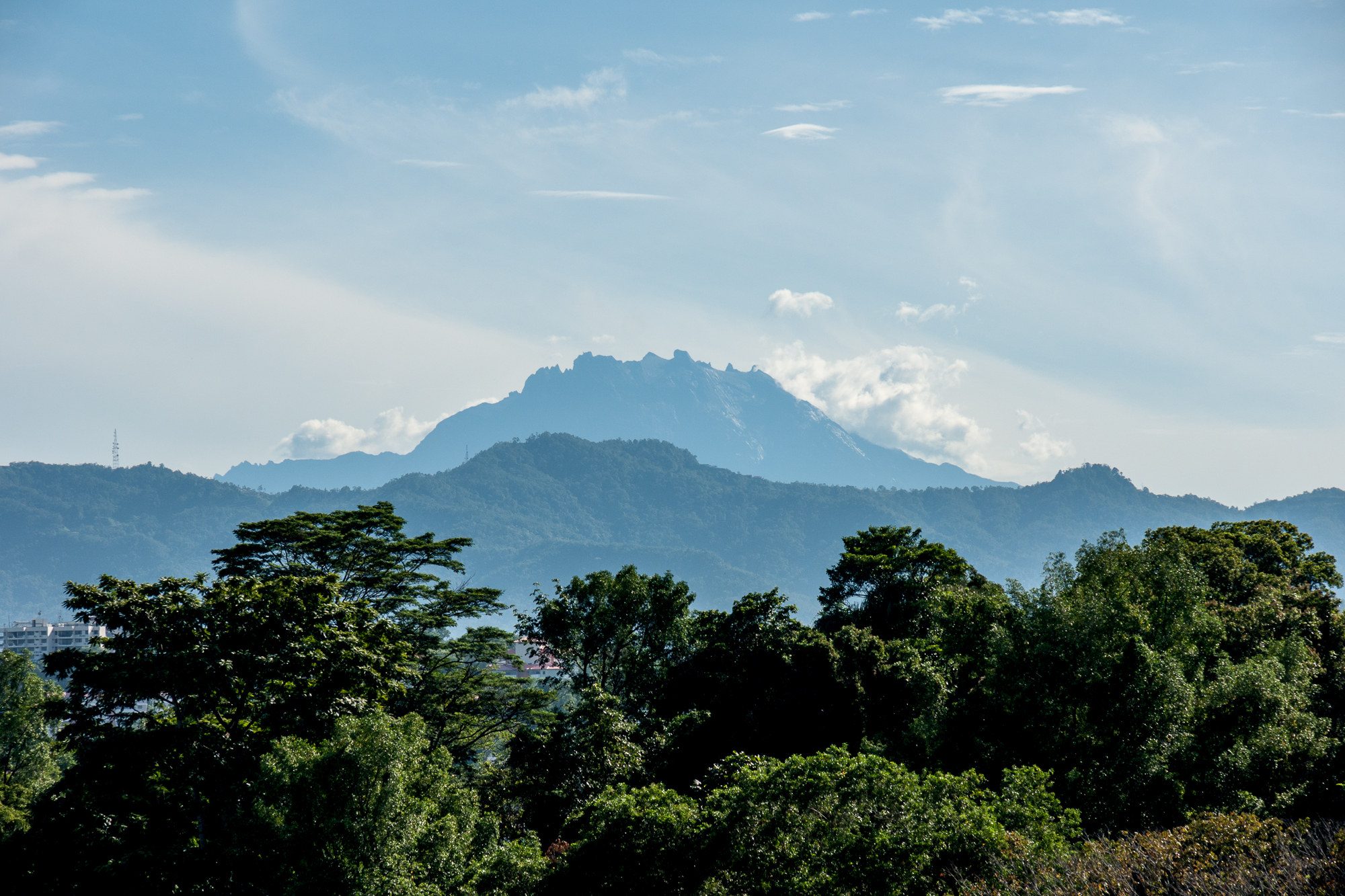
Mount Kinabalu, the highest summit on the island of Borneo, is a spiritually charged sacred mountain that is known among the Dusunic population of Sabah as the resting place (temporary and permanent) for the dead, and it is likened to Purgatory.

The majority of both the Kadazan and the Dusun believe that the spirits of their ancestors dwell at the summit of Mount Kinabalu. The Kadazan-Dusun call this mountain Kinabalu, which is derived from two words, "aki", which carries the meaning of "ancestor", and "nabalu" or "nabahu", which means "coffin". Thus, Kinabalu means "abode of the dead". A bobohizan does a ritual every year to appease the guiding spirit of the mountain, and the purpose of conducting such a ritual is to placate the spirit of Mount Kinabalu as well as the ancestral spirits. The ritual is understood to be a means of seeking the spirit's sanction and soliciting their protection during a climb. The Kadazan community, as a ritual isolate, is in constant interaction with the spirit world, which involves a number of sacrificial rituals to create a ritual state between the spirit world and themselves. The Kadazan believe in four principal spiritual entities, namely Minamangun (the Kadazan name for God the Creator), Koduduvo (the living person's spirit), Tombivo (the ghostly spirit of the dead) and Ogon (the evil spirit).

==== The role of the bobohizan ====
For animistic Kadazan, a bobohizan is a traditional priestess and ritual specialist who acts as an intermediary between the world and the spiritual realm, performing healing, agricultural and funerary rituals. An apprentice is believed to be chosen by an unseen nature spirit, or a divato, to become a bobohizan. The divato is also a protective guardian spirit unique to each bobohizan, believed to guide and safeguard them through both the spiritual and physical realms. The calling typically reveals itself through vivid recurring dreams, spiritual disturbances, unexplained illness or any combination of them. These signs are interpreted as evidence of a spiritual summons.

The following is a testimony by a bobohizan:

I never felt that I was the chosen one, but even I am amazed at how fast I am able to pick up the ancient languages in our inait and customs in our rituals, in such a short amount of time. We have no textbooks to refer to. You learn by listening and observing the elders. Some bobohizan take years to master some rituals, but I can pick it up in one go. I only accepted that I was the chosen one in two very memorable dreams. In my first dream, I was walking into the House of Skulls at Monsopiad Cultural Village. It was filled with many bobohizan, dressed in full traditional attire, sitting at the sides with their feet stretched forward. One of them called me to sit and said, "Bah, kasi mula lah" — "You can start now". I immediately began the magavau inait and the rest joined in. I woke up after the second verse. The second dream came two weeks later. I was walking aimlessly and an old lady appeared before me. Without a word, she handed me the bobohizan pedang (lit. ''sword''). The moment the pedang touched my hands, I woke up. The elders told me those dreams were a strong sign I was meant for this path.

— Adam Gontusan, 2021 interview

The chosen individual may be approached by one or more divato, each guiding her in specific types of rituals or spiritual duties. These spirits are often associated with elements of nature, such as rivers, forests or mountains, and they may serve as both protectors and sources of ritual power. Once the calling is confirmed, the individual enters a long period of oral apprenticeship under a senior bobohizan. The chosen individual, or the apprentice, learns ritual procedures, chants, taboos and the symbolic language of the spirit world. Bobohizan are sometimes regarded as having different ranks or degrees of knowledge, depending on their level of mastery and the types of spirits they work with. Those with deeper knowledge or broader ritual authority may preside over more complex ceremonies, or they may train others. An apprentice becomes a full bobohizan only after gaining the approval of her mentor and the recognition of the community. There is no formal ordination ceremony, her role is affirmed once she begins performing rituals independently and is accepted by the people as a legitimate spiritual authority. While lineage is not a requirement, some bobohizan may descend from an earlier bobohizan. However, the calling is open to any person believed to have been chosen by the spirit divato regardless of family background.

The bobohizan is usually an unmarried or widowed woman, as this allows her to focus entirely on spiritual service. They are expected to uphold personal discipline and moral conduct. Though respected, many live modestly, relying on voluntary offerings and community support rather than formal payment. When asking for help from a bobohizan to cure someone's prolonged or severe illness, she is usually called upon. The bobohizan should be informed of the relevant information by the sick person, this gives her a good background in locating the cause of the sickness. The bobohizan may also do preliminary consultations with a good-spirited "consultant", or a susukuon. Before the bobohizan goes to the house of the sick person, she consults her susukuon the night before as a way of finding the best way, determining the right offerings she can use in the healing ritual. Only then does she know whether a chicken, a pig or a buffalo is needed for a sacrifice. Sometimes, it may only take a simple inait, or an incantation, to heal a sick person.

There are a number of inait, or incantations, that a bobohizan can choose from based on the cause of a sickness. The basic ritual is the popo'intong or sumuku to get in touch with the good-spirited consultant for further guidance. She can chant other types of incantations such as searching for the strayed spirit of a sick person and preparing for its homecoming, and appeasing an evil spirit that causes a person's sickness with offerings until reaching the final stage of the ritual called rundukon, or being in a state of trance to engage in dialogue with the evil spirit, acting as an oracle for communication in attempt to know its intention. The rundukon stage is the longest ritual stage performed by a bobohizan, lasting almost 24 hours. Additionally, she can also read an incantation to "cleanse the debris" that has been induced into a person's body by an evil spirit, cure a person of the effects of black magic and liberate a sick person from disturbances caused by the dead. After treatment by a bobohizan, a patient must remain indoors for one to three days.

==== The invocation of the paddy spirit ====
In preparation for the magavau ceremony, the priestess carefully selects stalks of paddy and ties them together just before the harvesting period starts. These stalks are left in the field and not to be cut or tampered with until the harvesting is completed. The selected stalks of paddy symbolise the spirit of paddy. As soon as the harvest is over, these stalks are cut by the priestess and taken into the house of the owner of the field, thus entering the spirit into the house. A ritual called magavau then takes place when the paddy is winnowed and stored away in a tangkob, or a large traditional rice storage.

==== The ritual of magavau ====
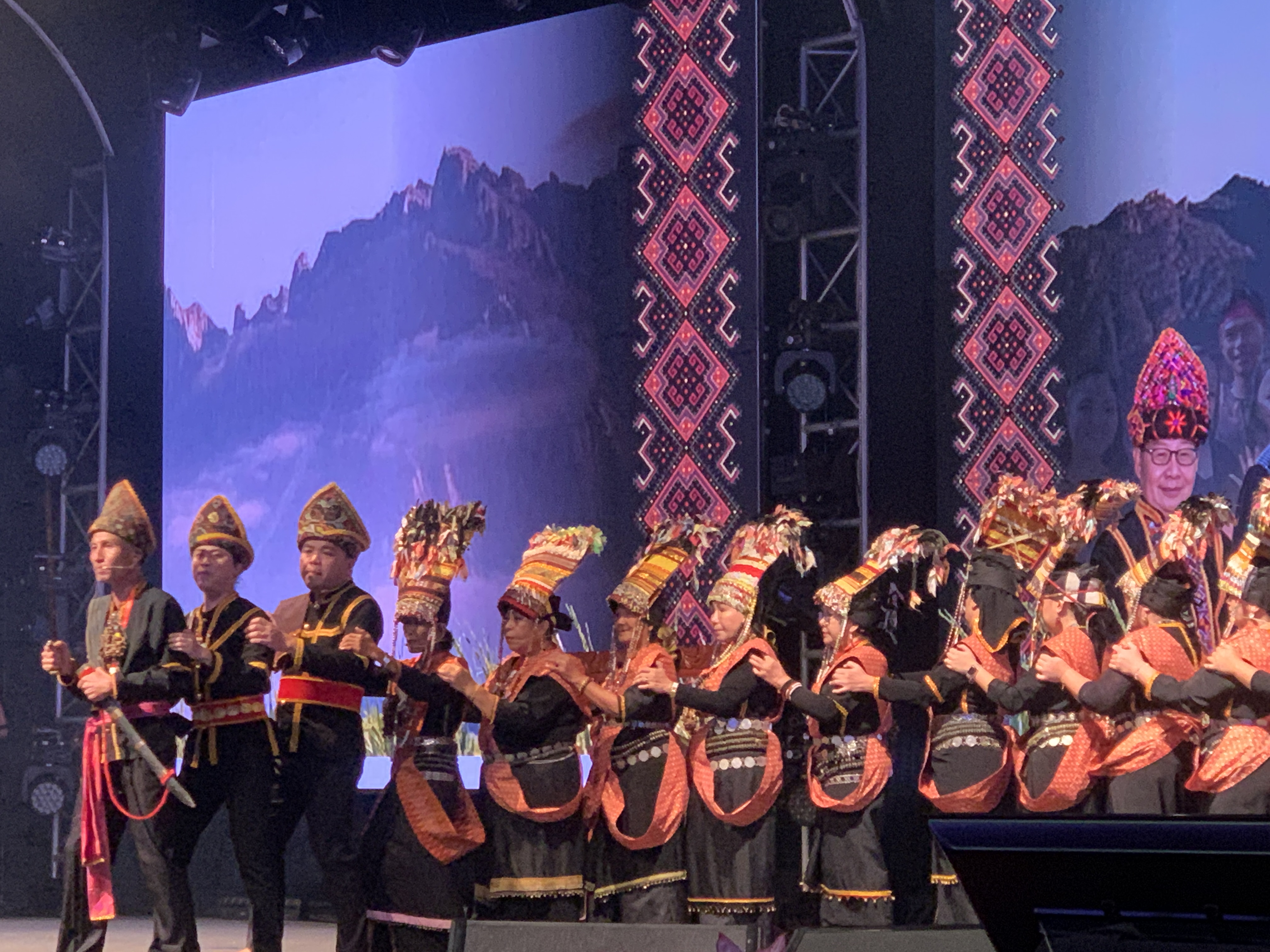
Bobohizan staging the magavau ritual

The magavau ritual is a sacred Kadazan thanksgiving ritual that serves as an appeasement to Bambazon, the rice spirit believed to guard the people's harvest and ensure their spiritual harmony. To some people, the magavau ritual is a form of ancestral reverence. This interpretation is sometimes supported by references to Bambazon, regarded as the manifestation of Huminodun, the only daughter of Kinoingan (not to be confused with the biblical Kinoingan) in the Kadazan-Dusun origin narrative. In this view, the reverence associated with Bambazon may be interpreted as having ancestral elements, rather than being understood solely as animistic practice.

The magavau begins just after sunset, when the priestess and her attendants sit on the floor in the living room and start chanting an ancient mantra, or an inait, to Bambazon, which continues further into the night. Then, the priestess and her attendants stand up and slowly circle around the living room while chanting. After a while, they start to sing songs of praise to Bambazon. At this stage, the men join the circle, singing together with the priestess and her attendants. As they sing, they stamp their feet on the floor rhythmically and, at regular intervals, utter a triumphant cry, or a pangkis. This ritual goes on until the break of dawn, when preparations are made to feed Bambazon with fermented rice, with ingredients similar to the rice wine tapai, prepared especially for Bambazon in the previous evening, and tapai. The ritual concludes with merrymaking as a mark of thanksgiving. Bambazon stays in the house, guarding the stored rice until the next planting season, when another ritual known as monogit is performed to fetch the paddy spirit, which may have wandered, appease it and send it back to the field.

==== Inait ====
Inait use highly archaic, poetic or esoteric language, or bos aahom, passed down orally across generations. Many inait structures are written in "paired lines", where the first line is spoken in everyday Kadazan and the second line uses the sacred ritual language. Therefore, inait are not typically meant to be understood by the general public. The bobohizan chants inait for specific purposes, each tied to a ritual or a ritual stage. Although inait are known as mantras, they are also widely regarded as poems, or hiis. (Note: Many poetry traditions around the world are rooted in ancient ritual practice. In the pre-Islamic Arabian Peninsula, ritual poetry was a deeply shamanistic practice where poets (sha‘ir) and oracle-priests (kahin) acted as literal magical mediums inspired by spirits (jinn) from the mythical valley of Wadi Abqar. They entered ecstatic states to chant saj‘—a cryptic, rhymed prose (assonance) mimicking the language of spirits—while tribal poets weaponised curse poetry (hija‘) as literal supernatural incantations to drain their enemies' cosmic strength during war. Islam structurally re-channelled the ecstatic saj‘ and the concept of divine inspiration into Sufism (Islamic mysticism). Anglo-Saxon metrical charms, rooted in the pre-Christian Germanic folklore of early medieval England, and Old Norse skaldic poetry, originating from the Viking Age communities of Scandinavia, both utilised heavy Germanic alliteration as a rhythmic ritual tool—the former to cast literal healing and protective spells, and the latter to invoke the Norse pantheon and preserve cultural history. Meanwhile, Vedic chanting, originating in the ancient Indo-Aryan civilisations of the Indian subcontinent, utilised strict, sacred poetic metres during sacrificial fire rituals to invoke Hindu deities, driven by the belief that the exact physical sound vibrations of the spoken verse held cosmic power. Meanwhile, ancient Israelite religion, rooted in the ritual traditions of the ancient Israelites, developed a poetic tradition closely associated with communal worship, sacrificial ceremonies and religious festivals. Early Hebrew poetry was frequently performed as song, with hymns and communal chants used to praise Yahweh, commemorate divine victories and accompany religious observances. The Psalms, many of which preserve traditions of ancient Israelite cultic worship, exemplify this relationship between poetry and ritual performance through their parallelism, rhythmic structures and musical accompaniment. Some of the oldest biblical compositions, such as the Song of Deborah (Judges 5), also preserve early traditions of communal celebratory and religious song. Over time, these oral and performative traditions were incorporated into written religious literature, becoming an enduring part of Jewish liturgical practice.) In Papar Kadazan, an incantation may also be known as a buntuh.

The following is an instance of a Kadazan incantation, translated to English:

Kadazan

Ala'at o pomogunan
Aansoi o pagazangan

Aiso tuhun momogun
Ida tuang magazan

Manu zou po do monitiu
Muut zou po do mononghinadau

Monotinau do tuhun
Mononghinadau do tuang

Pa'akano ku do gusizon
Po'otoko ku do gontungon

Translation:
English

The world is bad
The swords are worn out (?)

There are no people pioneering
There are no people breeding (?)

When I illuminate
When I succeed to become fluent (?)

To take care of people (?)
To become fluent of people (?)

I will feed the occupant of the jar
I will feed the one that is hung (?)

== Language ==
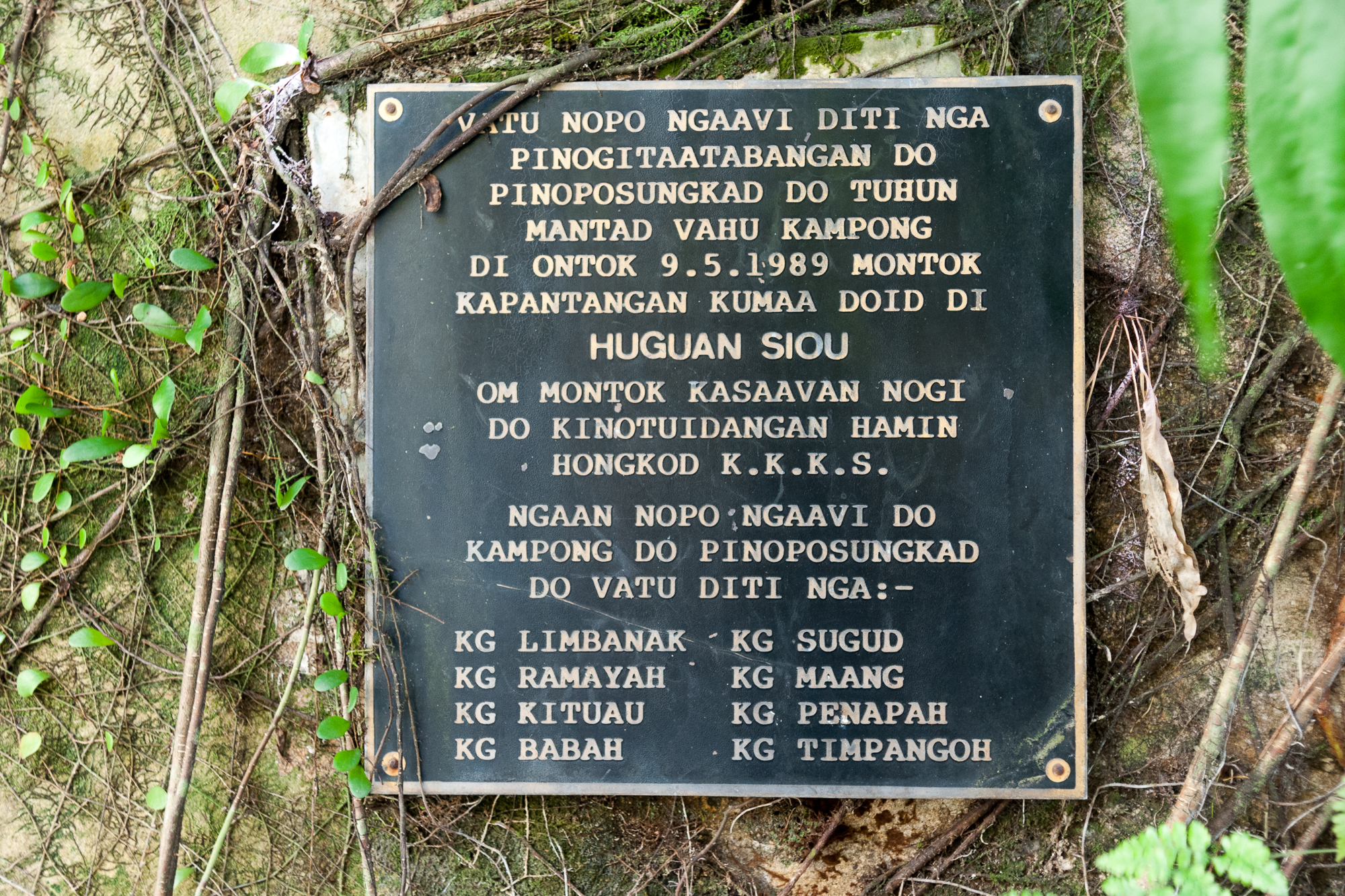
A commemorative plaque for the Huguan Siou, inscribed in Penampang Kadazan at the KDCA Compound

The Kadazan dialect has adopted several loanwords from other northern Bornean indigenous languages and Malay.

There are differences between the Papar Kadazan, Penampang Kadazan and Membakut Kadazan dialects in their pronunciation, vocabulary, and intonation, although all roughly belong to the Coastal Kadazan language (Tangara Dusun). Penampang Kadazan is regarded as the standard dialect. Papar Kadazan differs in having softer pronunciation, distinct verb forms, and vocabulary absent from Penampang Kadazan. For instance, "boy" in Penampang Kadazan is tanak kusai but sukod in Papar Kadazan. Although the speakers from these two regions are mutually intelligible, the dialect differences are audible to the native speakers in the respective districts.

Since the 2020s, the Kadazan and Dusun languages have become part of the national education curriculum and are taught in both primary and secondary schools in Sabah. In 2025, a proposal to expand the teaching of the Kadazan-Dusun language subjects in schools to include four other ethnic languages—the Tatana Dusun language of Kuala Penyu, Kadazan of Penampang, Timugon Murut of Tenom, and Lotud Dusun of Tuaran—was submitted to the federal government. In early 2026, Kadazan-English-Malay online dictionaries were published. The Kadazan, Dusun and Rungus languages also share some similarities with the languages of the Philippines, such as Tagalog.

The use of the Kadazan language has declined due to language shift enforced through government policies that emphasised Malay and English. English was introduced by pre-World War II missionaries during the British colonial rule, while Malay was promoted by the federal government. The government of Sabah initiated several policies to prevent the continuous decline, which also affects other indigenous languages of Sabah. This included a policy of using Kadazan and other indigenous languages in public schools, and efforts have been made to make the language an official language in Sabah. In a 2005 United Nations Educational, Scientific and Cultural Organization (UNESCO) report, the Kadazan-Dusun language was classified as an endangered language, since it was spoken by a mere 300,000 people. The language is among approximately 7,000 languages worldwide that are endangered.

The similarities between the Kadazan and Dusun languages are sufficient for speakers of these two languages to understand each other easily. The most salient distinction between these two languages is the difference in their phonemic inventories. The Kadazan are distinguished from the Dusun primarily through phonological differences in their use of the consonantal sounds, with /v/ and /z/ among the Kadazan, in contrast to the more common use of /r/, /w/, and /y/ sounds in Dusun dialects. In the 1991 Sabah Census, there were around 104,924 Kadazan and 216,910 Dusun, with the ethnicities categorised separately before they were merged years later.

== Indigenous status ==
Being indigenous to Sabah and within the federation of Malaysia, the Kadazan are conferred the same political, educational and economic rights as the predominant Malay population of Malaysia. The term used for this is bumiputera (from Sanskrit "bhumiputra"), a Malay word which translates to "son of the land". Presently, the Kadazan are associated with the Dusun and the Rungus under the umbrella term Kadazan-Dusun. This classification arose as a result of political developments, specifically when a resolution was passed at the 5th Kadazan Cultural Association (KCA) Delegates' Conference, which was later renamed to Kadazan-Dusun Cultural Association (KDCA) Delegates' Conference, held on 4 and 5 November 1989. It was decided as the best alternative approach to resolve the "Kadazan or Dusun" identity crisis that had crippled and impeded the growth and development of the Kadazan-Dusun community socio-culturally, economically and politically—ever since "Kadazan versus Dusun" sentiments were politicised in the early 1960s. Many consider the traditional geographical influences to be the major difference between the two ethnic groups, since the Kadazan mainly inhabit flat valley deltas suited to wet rice farming, while the Dusun mainly inhabit the hilly and mountainous interior of Sabah, with terrace farming, and are known for their upland rice.
