= Lotud people =

Ethnic group in Sabah, Malaysia

Lotud people Dusun Tuaran
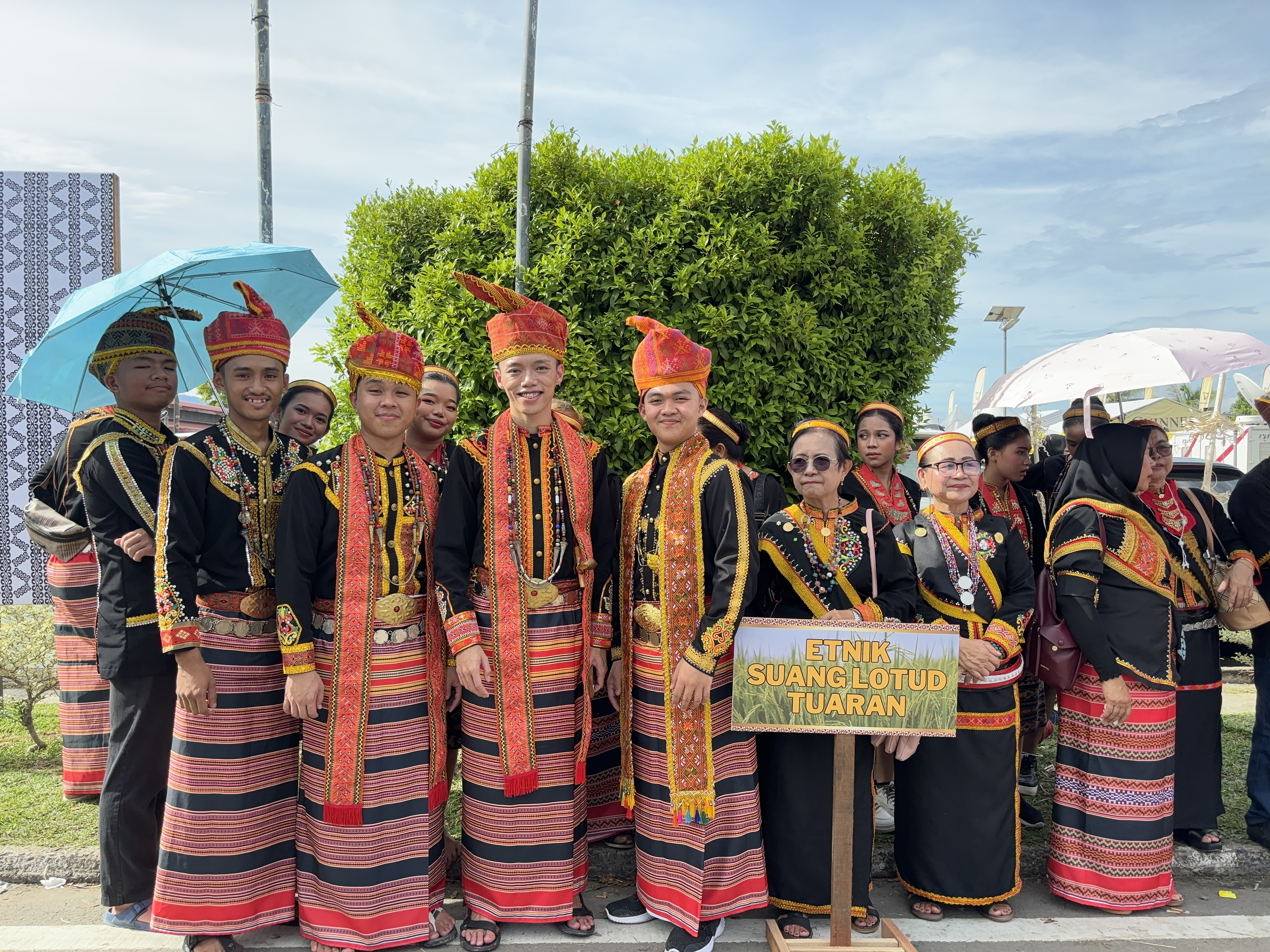
- Lotud Dusun in their traditional dress

Total population
- 24,000

Regions with significant populations
- Malaysia (Sabah)

Languages
- Lotud language or standard Dusun language, Malay, English

Religion
- Christianity (majority), Animism, Islam

Related ethnic groups
- Kadazan, Rungus, Murut, Sama-Bajau, Iranun, other Dusun peoples, other Austronesian peoples

The Lotud people are an indigenous ethnic group residing in Sabah, eastern Malaysia on the island of Borneo. They reside mainly in the Tuaran district (including the Tamparuli and Kiulu sub-districts) and also a portion of this tribe's population also reside in the village of Kampung Sukoli located in the Telipok suburban township of Kota Kinabalu city, all located in the West Coast Division of Sabah. Their population was estimated at 5,000 in the year 1985 but now believed to be more than 20,000. They are a sub-ethnic group of the Dusunic group, now also known as Kadazan-Dusun.

== History ==
Based on available historical records, Tuaran is among the historically significant settlement and trading areas of Sabah. Its proposed identification with the medieval camphor-producing centre of Tawaran, together with later accounts of its coastal settlements and indigenous trading networks, suggests a long history of commercial and cultural interaction in the region. (Note: The word "tawaran" in Lotud Dusun means "corn", while other Dusun dialects use the term "luong" for corn.)

=== Tawaran ===
The earliest record of Tawaran appears in the written records of Persian explorer Ibn Rustah who wrote a journal of his trip to Southeast Asia in 903 AD, in which he says that there is an island called "Tawaran". British scholar G. R. Tibbetts suggested Tawaran was located near the Durian Islands, southwest of Singapore. British historian Robert Nicholl proposed identifying the medieval place-name Tawaran with present-day Tuaran in Sabah, suggesting that it was an early camphor-producing centre in northwestern Borneo. He linked the name to Atawaran (L'île de Atawaran), recorded in Arabic geographical literature, which was transliterated by French orientalist Gabriel Ferrand in his 1913 compilation as the name of an island where camphor trees were found.

Nicholl associated Tawaran with the Kingdom of Muja, whose ruler was reportedly involved in warfare against the Chinese, according to Al-Ya'qubi. In the 9th century, Nicholl proposed that Chinese forces established a military garrison at Tawaran to exploit the region's camphor resources. He connected this presence with the Chinese conquest of the Mountains of Camphor described by Ibn Sa'id.

Subsequently, Tawaran was controlled by Srivijaya (suzerainty), as an island that was renowned for producing a particular species of camphor highly prized by merchants, reportedly valued at more than gold. (Note: Northwestern Borneo, particularly Tawaran, was never part of Srivijaya but maintained political ties with the kingdom, possibly amounting to subordination or suzerainty.) Nicholl further proposed that, following the extension of Srivijayan influence to the region, camphor from Tawaran was exported to Palembang rather than sent directly to China, marking a shift in its trade route around 835. Nicholl's interpretation was subsequently corrected by Kurz, who argued that the reference concerned the discovery or reporting of camphor at Tawaran, rather than a transfer of political control to Palembang.

Nicholl also proposed a separate episode of Chinese-connected military activity in the late 13th century, when Central Asian Turks allegedly arrived in Tawaran as Chinese mercenaries during the Yuan expeditionary period. According to his reconstruction, these mercenaries became stranded in the region and remained there into the first half of the 14th century.

The place-names Tawaran (also transliterated as Atawaran or Tuwaran) and Haranj were mentioned repeatedly in medieval Arabic and Persian geographical literature in connection with the camphor-producing lands of Southeast Asia. Drawing on a shared pool of 9th-century and 10th-century merchant reports—stemming from Ibn Khurradadhbih (c. 846–885) and the lost geography of Al-Jayhani (c. 914–922)—Borneo was documented as a camphor source within the maritime sphere of Srivijaya by Ibn Rustah (c. 903–913), Al-Qazwini (c. 1275), Abu al-Fida (c. 1310–1331) and Al-Dimashqi (c. 1300–1327), alongside related descriptions by Ibn Saʿid (c. 1250). According to historian Robert Nicholl, these accounts refer to the northwestern coastal strip of Borneo known locally as Saba (which he equated with Arabic Zabaj)—identifying Haranj with Sabah's west coast below Mount Kinabalu and Tawaran with Tuaran. (Note: In the 14th century, around the time Arab geographers Abu al-Fida and Al-Dimashqi were writing about camphor, Sumatra and Java were already known by their respective names. However, drawing on earlier geographical accounts without fully recognising their original geographical context, they perpetuated older place-names whose locations had become unclear. Among these were Zabaj and Haranj, which they associated with Sumatra or Java, despite earlier accounts describing a separate landmass farther north in the South China Sea. According to Nicholl, that land was Borneo, particularly the regions of Brunei and Tawaran, which were renowned sources of highly prized camphor.) Camphor from Southeast Asia was highly valued in medieval international trade, with Borneo and Sumatra recognised as important sources of the aromatic resin. Indigenous communities, particularly the Rungus and Tambunan Dusun, collected camphor from forest trees for trade through regional trading networks, as documented in later historical accounts.

=== Haranj ===
Mount Kinabalu viewed from the sea off the coast of Tuaran

According to Ishaq Ibn Imran, camphor was exported from several regions, including Sofala, Kalah, Zabaj, and especially from Harij, which he identified as “Little China” and described as a major source of camphor exports. (Note: Haranj was often misspelled as Hazlaj, Kharanj and Harij.) The 12th-century Arab geographer Al-Idrisi described Haranj as an island distinguished by a great chasm, upon whose bottom no one could stand. Al-Idrisi says:

And on the island of Hazlaj is a great chasm where no one stands upon its bottom and it is among the visible wonders of the earth.

Robert Nicholl cited these accounts in proposing that Haranj was located in northwestern Borneo, possibly in the vicinity of present-day Tuaran (due to Mount Kinabalu being in its backdrop as seen from the sea), a region long renowned as a major source of Borneo camphor. (Note: Persian traders likely named the northwestern Bornean coastline Haranj (هرنج) after the classical Persian word for an open-air water channel emerging from mountain foothills. In Persia, a haranj functioned as an uncovered waterway bringing fresh mountain water into the open for drinking, farming, and daily community life. To Persian sailors, the rivers of northwestern Borneo mirrored this exact landscape and function—flowing down from the foothills of Mount Kinabalu to sustain local communities with fresh water while acting as open channels funneling inland forest camphor out to the sea.) Notably, Mount Kinabalu remains visible on clear days from as far away as the summit of Bukit Sipatir in Brunei, roughly 219 kilometres to the southwest, illustrating just how far along the coast the mountain served as a prominent navigational landmark.

=== Kingdom of Muja ===
The name Muja is used by Arab scholar Al-Ya'qubi in his description of a kingdom on the west coast of Borneo in 1154. According to Ibn Sa'id in Nicholl's book, this kingdom was ruled by a king of the dynasty Kamrun. Around the late 9th century, Al-Ya'qubi mentioned the kingdoms of Muja and Mayd as neighbouring China and waging war against it. Robert Nicholl later associated Mayd with the Philippine polity of Ma-i and argued that it was a dependency of Brunei. Ibn Sa'id's account further mentions the Mountains of Camphor, which belonged to the Kamrun but were partly conquered by the Chinese. Nicholl considered this account potentially relevant to the early history of Brunei and northwestern Borneo. Nicholl identified Muja's “Mountains of Camphor” with the mountainous interior behind Brunei Bay, associating them with the Crocker Range, which extends into the hinterland of Tuaran.

Al-Idrisi's account of the Kingdom of Muja suggests that maritime trade activities formed part of the region's early society. This account may be considered alongside Dusun, particularly Lotud Dusun, oral traditions in Sabah, which describe their ancestors as skilled navigators and seafarers, suggesting a historical association with maritime culture. Among the famous oral stories is the story of Indai (Kg. Indai, Tuaran), a maritime settlement that established trading relations with other trading centres from across the kingdom, most notably Bongawan. Similarly, the story of Nunuk Ragang tells of the voyage of ancestral pre-Islamic Bruneians or ancestral Bornean Bisaya from Brunei to Nunuk Ragang, with some of them migrating to the Philippines. The oral history of the Lotud Dusun in Tuaran also says the same thing, that their ancestors were seafarers, but their maritime dominance was eventually replaced by Bajau and Iranun seafarers who migrated to Mengkabong and Sulaman in the late 1700s. This is evidenced by the writings of Dalrymple, which were quoted by Dr. Leyden, saying that the "Idaan" continued maritime voyages reaching as far as Java up to the year 1762, then this maritime culture disappeared. (Note: The term "Ida'an" was used by the Bajau and foreign scholars to refer to the Kadazan-Dusun in the past. It is not to be confused with the present-day Ida'an.) It was likely that the maritime culture died out in the early 1800s, as evidenced by a journal article authored by Hugh Low, who said that the Dusun people sailed to Java in ancient times but no longer did when he came to Sabah in 1852.

Apart from maritime culture, Al-Idrisi also recorded the clothing culture of the Muja community. During the rule of the Kingdom of Muja, the women were said to like to keep their hair long and wear head accessories, and they also wore necklaces. As for men, they were divided into ranks according to the type of metal used for their neck ornaments. For the higher-ranking groups, they wore gold-plated or real-gold neck ornaments, while those in the lower ranks only wore necklaces made of copper. Several Western writers have provided notes on the culture of wearing necklaces among Dusun men. St. John, who came to Sabah in 1851, and Frank Hatton, wrote the following:

...then came in a party of the Ida'an, whose young chief, broad-shouldered, with his waist drawn in as tightly as he could, had a very intelligence countenance; over his breast he wore strings of cowrie shells, round his loins neatly-worked rattan rings, and on his neck a broad brass collar open at the side, enabling him to take it off with ease. — St. John, 1863

The Dusuns at "Toadilah" all wear brass collars, bracelets, and anklets, and a piece of black cloth round the head, kept on by a band of red rattans. — Frank Hatton, 1882

The notes by St. John and Hatton are some of the earliest records of Dusun clothing culture.

A document by Yuan Dynasty historian Wang Dayuan titled Daoyi Zhilüe, written in 1350 AD, provides interesting data on the heyday of the Kingdom of Muja or Po-Ni. It talks about the residents of Longshan (lit. Dragon Mountain), in which the surrounding area is referred to as a flat-land area that is quite cold but comfortable. The residents in the area, both women and men, like to decorate themselves, whose hair is bunned and their waists are wrapped in multi-coloured cloth. Surprisingly, there are residents in the area who worship a Buddha statue and have relations with the Chinese, whether through marriage or trade. Borneo historian Robert Nicholl proposed that the mountain in question was Mount Kinabalu, though his claim was contested by German researcher Johannes L. Kurz.

=== Arrival of the Bajau ===
According to one migration theory, the West Coast Bajau, also known as the Samah, originated from the Johor–Riau region before migrating to the west coast of North Borneo. Historical accounts place their settlements along the coast, particularly around Mengkabong, by the 18th century. They established coastal and riverside communities, with fishing, agriculture and trade forming important parts of their livelihoods. Bajau traders also supplied marine products and other goods to communities in the hinterland. In Tuaran, the Bajau lived alongside indigenous Dusun communities, including the Lotud, although relations between coastal and inland groups were not always peaceful. Historical accounts also describe instances of intergroup conflict, as well as some mixing and cultural interaction between communities.

=== Origins of the Dusun ===
Local scholars argue Nunuk Ragang is not the oldest Dusun settlement in Sabah, and not all Dusun communities originated from Nunuk Ragang. According to Saimin Ginsari, the migration of Dusun communities from the coastal regions of Borneo towards the interior began around the early 13th century, traditionally dated to 1212. Nunuk Ragang subsequently emerged as the largest Dusun settlement in Sabah, following further migrations from coastal areas during the 15th century. This interpretation suggests that Dusun settlement in Sabah was not exclusively rooted in the interior, and that some communities had established coastal settlements before moving inland.

=== Tenumpasuan, warfare and domali ===
Tenumpasuan, in I.H.N. Evans' book, is a type of sword that is derived from a type of sword originating outside Borneo. The sword was often traded by traders from Brunei who came to Sabah. This sword probably first became known in Southeast Asia around the 1500s, brought by Indian, Arab, Persian or Turkish traders. Foreign traders exchanged goods with various indigenous tribes, connecting inland regions to the coast through trade relations. Local artisans adopted the design of the foreign sword to suit their preferences. In the Malay world, it is known as Pedang Chenangkas or Pedang Brunei. The sword is widely distributed throughout the Malay archipelago. The sword's blade is mostly curved, but a few variants have straight blades. In Brunei, historical records indicate the sword was used in warfare. In Sarawak, Pedang Cenangkas was associated with social status and distinctions of rank, serving as a marker of aristocratic standing. Tomé Pires in his book Suma Oriental que trata do Mar Roxo até aos Chins ("Summa of the East, from the Red Sea up to the Chinese"), written between 1512 and 1515, confirmed that, around the same time, all the trading ports in Southeast Asia had many Persian, Turkish, Arab and Indian traders. Different from other Dusun tribes, the Lotud tribe has replaced the original scabbard to their version that is adorned with intricate floral carving typical of the Lotud tribe. At the end of the scabbard is a carving resembling a scorpion's tail and is adorned with human hair from headhunting activities.

When the Iranun tribe migrated from Mindanao to Sabah in the late 1700s, they established their colony on the coasts of Sabah, with one of their main settlements in the Tuaran area. Due to the Iranun doing illegal activities that threatened the safety of the Lotud in their daily lives, the Lotud attacked their settlements, forcing them to migrate to Tempasuk. The Bajau who came to Tuaran were able to assimilate well with the Lotud, so there were few conflicts between the two. The Lotud were involved in conflicts with other Dusun groups, including the Bundu and Tagahas. One account of this weapon appears in I. H. N. Evans's book, in which he describes a headhunting ritual in the Tuaran area known as domali. The ritual was performed when warriors returned from war or headhunting after taking an enemy's head. Evans describes part of the ritual as follows:

The portion of the ceremonies that I witnessed was a procession of seven or eight men walking in single file near a village, while they kept up a continual cry that had a peculiar whistling sound. Each man was wearing one of the brass-hilted swords known as "pedang", but this was sheathed in a scabbard about four feet long, which broadened out to a width of six inches at its farther end. The lower edges of the scabbard were profusely decorated with human hair and its outer face with carved patterns, the whole weapon being called a "tenumpasuan". The leader of the party carried a conch-shell trumpet, on which he blew occasional blasts, and all wore attached to their belts large bunches of silad leaves. One man had a human vertebra to which was tied a triangular plaited ornament of the same kind of leaves.

== Culture and traditions ==
=== Traditional house ===
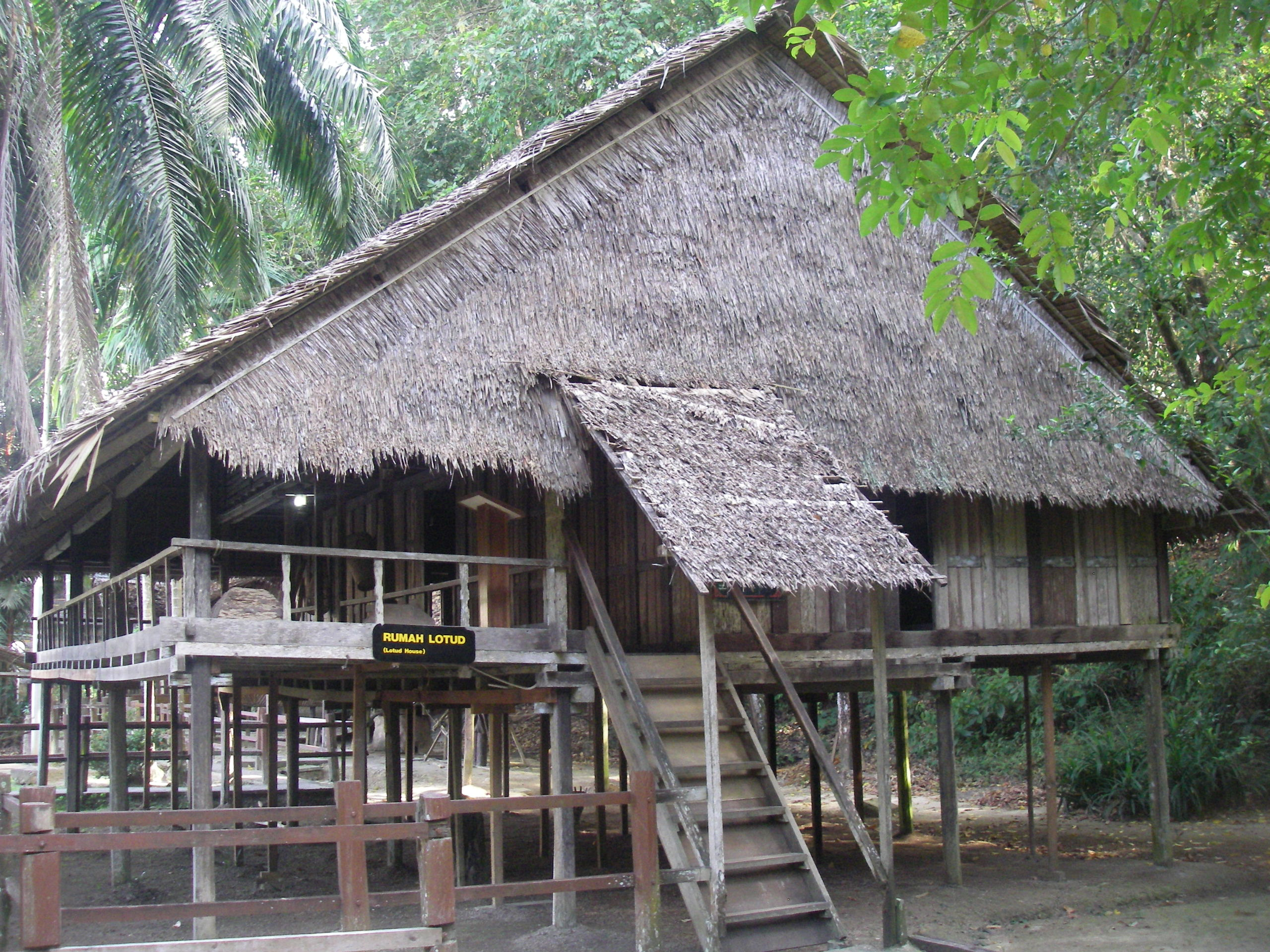
The traditional Lotud house in the Heritage Village at the Sabah State Museum Complex in Kota Kinabalu

The traditional Lotud house consists of six parts, namely soliu, soriba, rapuhan, kawas, pantaran and tilud. According to the their belief system, Lotud's houses are modelled after those in the spirit world.

Today, the traditional Lotud house is regarded as one of the most sophisticated examples of traditional architecture in Sabah, alongside the Murut longhouse in the Tenom district. Its structure is made of wooden planks, which in the past were roughly hewn using an adze without the aid of a saw. The house is constructed without a single nail, which was difficult to obtain in earlier times. Instead, it employs an ingenious slip-joint technique using appropriately fitted structural beams, with varnish applied to the wooden surfaces. Each house unit consists of a sleeping area (ko'odopo), a kitchen (ropuhan), an attic (tilud), and a corridor (olot-olot) separating the front wall of the house from the veranda (soliu).

=== Traditional attire ===
Lotud traditional accessories displayed on a woven tray

The traditional attire of the Lotud is distinguished by its predominantly red garments, intricate linangkit embroidery and traditional accessories. Traditionally worn during ritual ceremonies, Madsayau performances and wedding celebrations, the attire reflects the Lotud people's cultural identity, craftsmanship and customary practices. It is divided into three types:

- Kinirapa'an do Tantagas (priestly attire) – worn by tantagas during ceremonies involving the propitiation of paddy spirits or malevolent spirits.
- Nirapa'an (dance attire) – worn by male and female Madsayau dancers for ritual performances, ceremonial occasions and entertainment.
- Kinirapa'an do Milamak (bridal attire) – worn by the bride and groom during traditional marriage ceremonies.

Women's attire (Nirapa'an Tondu)

Traditional Lotud women's attire consists of a long-sleeved blouse, or sukob kopio. Its short-sleeved variation, traditionally made in black and decorated with colourful embroidery. These are paired with a gonob, a knee-length black skirt adorned with geometric linangkit embroidery. Around the waist, women wear a lilimbo, a decorative belt made from coiled rattan, whose colours traditionally distinguish marital and age status—red for unmarried women, red and black for married women. The outfit is complemented by a mandapun, a necklace traditionally decorated with copper or aluminium pieces; a siwot, a hair ornament incorporating red cloth and black chicken feathers; (Note: The siwot is a required piece of traditional attire for Lotud women, including brides and ritual priestesses, during formal cultural events and religious ceremonies. Like other elements of Lotud attire—such as their linangkit embroidery motifs—incorporating natural materials reflects the community's close relationship with their environment and local wildlife. A traditional siwot consists of four stems made from bundles of rooster or chicken feathers wrapped in red and white cloth. Dangling beads (which historically replaced iridescent beetle wings) hang from the front and back stems to frame the wearer's face and bun. In modern times, artisans often repurpose feathers from badminton shuttlecocks to craft the siwot cleanly and sustainably. Jewel beetle accessories trace their origins to ancient East and South Asia, where the iridescent metallic wing-cases (elytra) of beetles belonging to families like Buprestidae (Chrysochroa and Sternocera) were harvested for sacred, ritual and high-status decorative art. In ancient Korea and Japan, jewel beetle exoskeletons were prized for elite funerary objects and Buddhist art, most famously seen in the 7th-century Tamamushi Shrine at Horyu-ji in Nara, Japan, which is lacquered and inlaid with shimmering green beetle wings. In India, particularly, the craft flourished in regions like Banaras, Lucknow, and Hyderabad, where the wings were steamed, trimmed, and hand-stitched onto silk, muslin, turbans and courtly garments, often combined with zardozi gold and silver wire embroidery. European fashion adopted the trend through colonial trade and global exhibitions, such as the 1862 Great Exhibition in London. English and Western ladies embroidered beetle wings onto evening gowns, shawls and jewelry. Iconic historical pieces include Ellen Terry's 1888/1889 Lady Macbeth stage costume, which featured roughly 1,000 beetle wings, and Lady Mary Curzon's 1903 Peacock Dress for the Delhi Durbar. In Thailand and Myanmar, the tradition of using beetle elytra for paintings, textiles, and ornaments continued through local craftsmanship, later revitalized in the 1980s under Queen Sirikit's efforts but were later replaced by synthetic beads. The Achuar of the Peruvian and Ecuadorian Amazon are renowned for crafting intricate ceremonial jewelry from the iridescent wing covers (elytra) of tropical jewel beetles.) and a sigar, which is a headband. A scarf, or a sandai, that is roughly three metres in length is draped evenly over the shoulders and across the chest, allowing its ends to flow down the back. The sigar is made from red-dyed rattan loops wrapped around a fabric band and decorated with embossed gold-leaf plates or gold-colored metal strips. The mandapun is a traditional neck ornament prominently worn by the Lotud and Bajau communities of Sabah's West Coast, particularly in the neighbouring districts of Tuaran and Kota Belud. It typically takes the form of a broad, crescent-shaped or bib-style collar, made from velvet and metal sheets that are either made of brass, copper or gold-plated metal. Historically, such neck ornaments among Dusunic and coastal Sabahan communities were associated with social status, wealth and rank, with gold and gold-plated ornaments signifying greater prestige. Lotud beaded necklaces have significance beyond personal adornment. They are an expression of Lotud cultural identity, wealth, social standing and customary heritage. Traditionally, beads were valuable heirlooms, used in marriage exchanges, bride price payments and as collateral for loans. Certain beads, known as manas, were believed to possess spiritual powers and provide protection or good fortune. The karoh, distinguished by its strands of beads and brass cone-shaped ornaments, was traditionally given as a wedding gift by a husband to his wife and passed down through generations.

Men's attire (Nirapa'an Kusai)

Traditional Lotud men's attire consists of sukub, or a black shirt traditionally decorated with embroidered motifs on the sleeves and chest, paired with a mugah, a handwoven long skirt. The mugah reflects the weaving traditions of Sabah's Iranun communities, whose textiles have been incorporated into Lotud clothing. The head is adorned with a sundi or sigar, a traditional headdress, while a haboi, a cloth used to secure the waist garment, holds the outfit in place. The sigar is made from kain dastar, a textile strongly associated with the Iranun. Additional adornments include a sandai, a handwoven sash draped diagonally across the upper body. The sash is paired with a linangkit scarf, or a kuluwu. The waist is further decorated with a botungkat, a belt made of linked silver coins that is often associated with Kadazan-Dusun women, and a bobutulan, a traditional men's belt of Bruneian origin, made of silver or brass. Jewellery consists of beaded necklaces incorporating beads, shells and wooden components, and a silver bracelet called a simpai. A tarapapan, a traditional Lotud keris, serves as both an ornamental accessory and a traditional weapon. Wearers of the attire are often seen with a supu, a small and round silver tobacco container attached to a silver chain that is worn around the waist as a traditional accessory.

Linangkit

According to folklore, the linangkit originated from patterns brought by traders from China. This can be proven through the arrival of Chinese people to Borneo to trade, and they carried out a barter system. Meanwhile, a tantagas from the Tuaran district believes that the linangkit actually originated among the Bornean people themselves, namely the Dusun, Rungus and Bajau. The traditional embroidery of the linangkit and lumangkit, or the act of needle-weaving by hand, have been passed down through generations from their ancestor Odu Liugan, a woman of Lotud Dusun descent from Tuaran. Another opinion is that the linangkit originated from the inspiration of the embroiderer themself. It was passed down through generations by them. This statement was from the owner of the Tuaran Lotud Museum, Pediman Jabau, who was the eldest son of Odu Liugan. Linangkit weavers in the past used rice water as a fabric stiffener. Linangkit needlework depends on the imagination and inspiration of the embroiderer to produce motifs. There are four known linangkit motifs, namely Lininsou Sadur (Watermelon Seeds), Daun Abur-abur (Abur-abur Leaf), Permatang dan Batu (Paddy Field Boundaries and Rocks) and Pucuk Rebung (Bamboo Shoot).

=== Moniang ===
"Moniang" is the term for chewing betel nuts used in the Lotud Dusun language, and it is a cultural tradition found among Dusun women. Red chalk processed from sea snail shells mixed with a few gambir and aged areca nuts or areca nut skins, wrapped in betel leaves, then it is placed in the mouth to be chewed until the saliva in the mouth turns red, but it is not swallowed; when the mouth feels full, the betel chewer spits out the reddish saliva.

=== Traditional dance and music ===
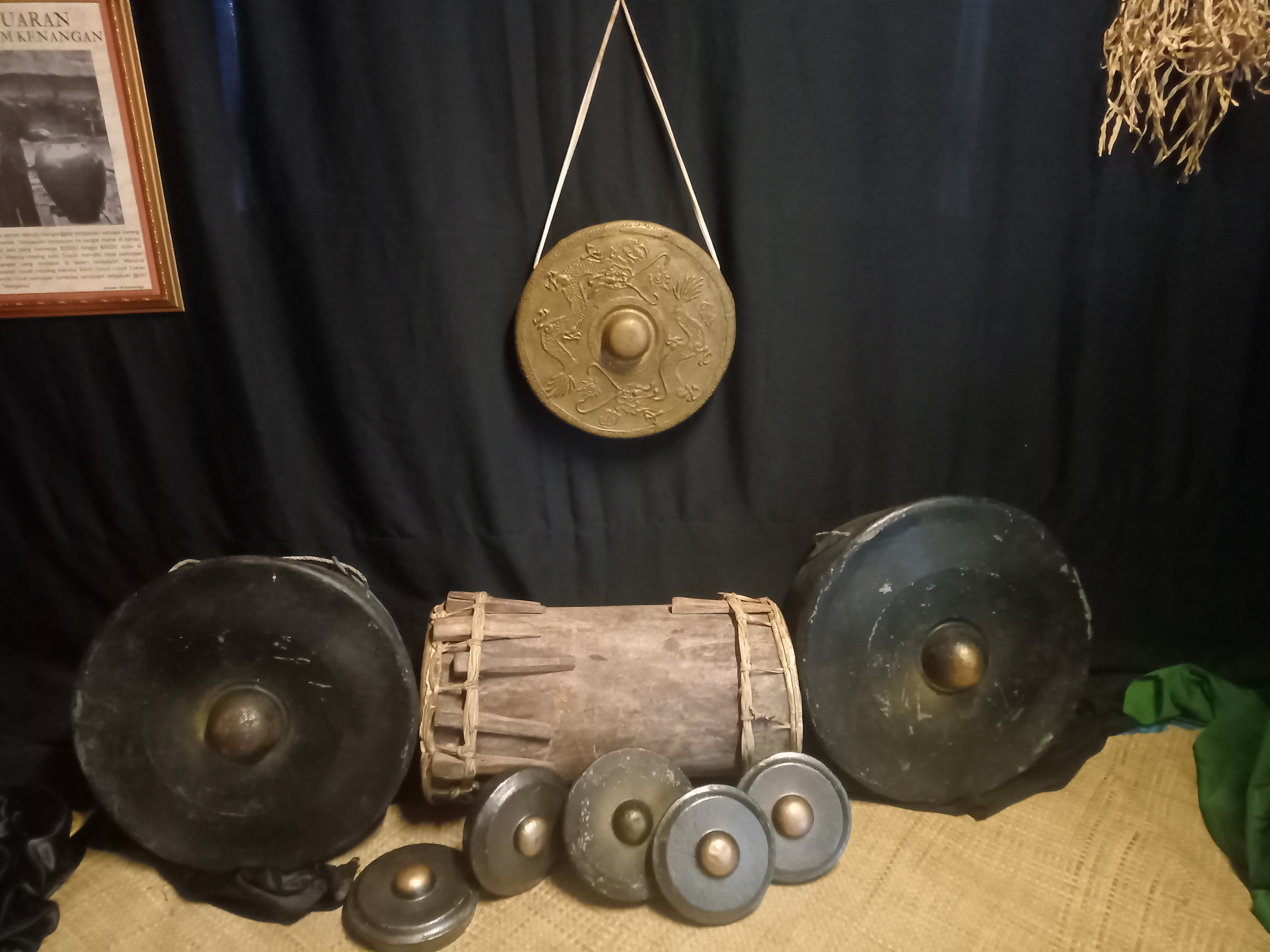
Lotud's traditional musical instruments

Traditional Lotud musical instruments include the tawag-tawag, kulintangan, gagayan, giring and gandang.

Madsayau is the traditional dance of the Lotud Dusun. Typically, this dance is an attraction during the celebration of Magahau, which is linked to a ritual to worship the spirit of the gusi. Usually this ceremony is held on a large scale and takes up to five days. It is performed for the commemoration of family members who have died.

The ritual is led by a tantagas, a woman well-versed in the ritual, and she is of tantagas descent. As soon as the music starts, the dancers move straight to the dance floor and begin dancing. The female dancers' hand movements follow the rhythm of the music, and their foot movements are slower than their hand movements, which only occur in very slow increments. The male dancers ring tiny bells, or giring. The dance movements become more lively when they receive applause from the audience.

==== Bojumbak Festival ====
The festival was introduced by the Sabah Lotud Komulasakan Association and the Lotud Suang Association, and it was officiated by Hajiji Noor in 2017. The festival is a Lotud cultural instrumental music competition. They perform songs from several villages across Tuaran, each with its own meaning conveyed through rhythm.

=== Marriage ===
There are five stages in the Lotud marriage, namely merisik (pre-engagement visit), monunui (engagement), popiodop (staying overnight), matod (marriage) and mirapou.

==== Timpu' merisik (Pre-engagement visit) ====
The representative of the male's side who is knowledgeable in customs, called the suruhan, plays the main role of an intermediary for the woman's family who sets a suitable time for merisik, or negotiation. He visits the woman's house for this task. During the merisik, the woman gets to know the man's background such as family lineage, character and his ability to interpret the meaning of dreams from the woman's side. If the dream is not good, sogit mimpi (dream fine) is imposed for the purpose of reconciliation or peace. According to custom, if the man does not have a suruhan, he will be "fined" with adat malu (reprehension) by the woman's family.

==== Timpu' monunui (Engagement) ====
The custom of monunui, or engagement, is carried out by setting a date in advance if the proposal made in the previous merisik is accepted and both sides agree to the stipulated conditions. Usually, this custom is carried out on the 14th day of a one-month cycle, called tawang kopiah, or the 15th day, called tolokud. This custom can only be done in the morning and the man's family must leave the woman's house before 4.00 p.m.. The man gives the woman a ring as a sign of engagement. The engagement period is usually one year.

During the engagement ceremony, the head of the village and his servants sit in the front row. At this time, the bride-to-be is not allowed to leave the house. The groom-to-be is not allowed to be in the house area until the ceremony is over. Important matters that may be discussed during the engagement are the tinunui, or berian in Malay, belanja hangus (literally "burnt expenditure" or non-refundable customary payment to cover the wedding reception), bride's gifts and sogit (financial penalty). The custom of paying the bride price and covering the belanja hangus are part of the main elements of the marriage, and this is discussed by the head of the village, the male's side and the female's side. The "meal" for this discussion is usually a simple one, consisting of a few kirai leaves (tobacco leaf buds) and dried tobacco to be made into cigarettes.

==== Timpu' matod (Wedding ceremony) ====
The demand of the female's family for the bride price usually consists of a buffalo, RM1,000 in cash and RM5,000 or above in cash for "kitchen expenses". The mandatory custom of giving land is known as pinolusadan do aluwid, along with approved land tax. The purpose of this gift is the construction of a house for the couple to use when they have children. If the groom does not have land, then giving four binukul (precious ancient items worth around RM1,000), a custom called adat berian, is considered to have fulfilled the specified conditions.

== Cuisine ==
Traditional Lotud Dusun cuisine includes nasi kombos, a traditional rice dish prepared from glutinous rice cooked in young coconut water and mixed with grated coconut flesh. Interestingly, it is traditionally served in a hollowed-out coconut shell, making the coconut both an ingredient and a serving vessel. Other traditional foods include kombos and tinojok, two varieties of traditional kuih prepared by boiling. The Lotud are also associated with bahar, a traditional alcoholic beverage made from fermented coconut sap, or nira. Its preparation involves the use of rosok, a type of tree bark added during fermentation, which contributes to the beverage's distinctive character. Bahar is particularly associated with Lotud cultural practices and is documented in studies of their traditional drinking culture. It is also consumed in social and ceremonial settings, reflecting its place in Lotud cultural heritage.

== Religion ==
Most of this ethnic group's population has been Christianized by adhering to denominations such as Roman Catholicism (in Tuaran district proper as well as the suburban township of Telipok in Kota Kinabalu city) and Seventh-Day Adventism (mostly those residing in Tamparuli and Kiulu sub-districts as well as in Telipok since the neighbouring town of Manggatal, both within the Kota Kinabalu city area has a Seventh-Day Adventist majority population among its native Dusun populace) with a large Muslim minority (both converts to the faith and Muslim by birth and ethnic descent alike) and some lesser extent to evangelical Christianity (Borneo Evangelical Church) as well as other denominations such as Anglicanism, True Jesuism and Lutheranism (Basel Christian Church of Malaysia), with a dwindling number are still animists. Less than 20 traditional priestesses are still alive, with no prospect of future replacement.

=== Momolianism ===
The Lotud ethnic group has their own spiritual world. In the Lotud spiritual world, their god Kinohoringan and his wife, Umsumundu, are widely believed to be the creators of the first humans and everything in the universe. The asug tantagas exists in the spiritual world of the Lotud ritual expert. She is sent to the spiritual world to persuade Hajin Sambawon. She is said to be the spiritual leader of Libabou (equivalent to Heaven), a place said to be located in the clouds. The role is specifically mandated by Kinohoringan and Umsumundu in overseeing human behavior in the invisible realm. If there is a violation of customary laws or natural rules of life that emphasize the balance between the visible and invisible worlds, the universe will become disordered. The role of the asug tantagas is to facilitate the release of trapped human spirits. In the Lotud spiritual world, the asug tantagas functions as the intermediary between the human world and the unseen world.

== Language ==
The Lotud ethnic group has its own, distinct language known as the Lotud language. Suang means "group", while Lotud is the name of the tribe. The official language code for the Lotud Dusun language is dtr.

Standard Dusun Language	Suang Lotud Language	English
Kopisanangan.	Kopiranggayan.	Greetings/Hello.
Pounsikou.	Palad-palad.	Thank you.
Kopisanangan, dokoyu toinsanan.	Kopiranggayan, jumuyu.	Hello, everyone.
tadau	adaw	day
lindung	bodung	eel
