= Tuaran Hospital =

- Malaysian Ministry of Health

Geography
- Location: Kilometre 4, Kota Kinabalu - Tuaran Road, Tuaran, Sabah, Malaysia

Organisation
- Care system: Public
- Type: District
- Patron: Health Director-General of Malaysia

Services
- Emergency department: Yes
- Beds: 10

Helipads
- Helipad: No

History
- Founded: 1994

Links
- Lists: Hospitals in Malaysia

Hospital Tuaran is a public hospital in Tuaran, Sabah, Malaysia.

== History ==
Health service commenced in Tuaran in 1933, known as Tuaran Dispensary. It was constructed by the North Borneo Chartered Company and then handled by a paramedic and an attendant.

Until 1989, Sabah Health Department was replaced the dispensary by Tuaran Policlinic, situated at a rented shop in Tuaran. On that time, the government planned and carried out the construction of Tuaran Hospital. The current hospital building construction finished in 1993, and then opened by the Health Minister on that time, Lee Kim Sai, on 9 April 1994. It serves thousands of peoples in Tuaran, Kota Belud, Ranau and northern Kota Kinabalu.

In 2007, Deputy Prime Minister Najib Razak during his visit to Tuaran, announced that the government passed the budget of hundred million Ringgit to build the new hospital building. In November 2010, Tuaran MP Wilfred Bumburing announced that the government to build the new hospital behind the current hospital for RM 120 million budget in 10th Malaysia Plan as he ask that ministry to speed up the construction even he knew that the Tuaran Hospital was downgraded to a health clinic last times.

The construction of the new hospital building that will contain 76 beds was commenced in 2011 as the WCT Berhad won the project bid worth RM 127.8 million and will be finished before 1 May 2013.

== Organization ==
The hospital was headed by the Hospital Director. In past years, the hospital was headed by the Regional Health Officer. The head of hospital was helped by the hospital administrative committee, the hospital facility manager and the hospital Board of Visitors.

== Service ==
Tuaran Hospital provides administrative services, clinical services and support services.

Hospital administrative services contains Management Unit, Finance Unit, Revenue Unit, Vehicle Unit, Nursing Unit, Paramedical Unit, Health Attendant Unit, and Corporate Communication Unit.

Hospital clinical services contains Outpatient Unit, Tuberculosis and Leprosy Unit, Emergency and Trauma Unit and Alternative Birth Centre.

Hospital support services contains Radiology Unit, Pathology and Forensic Unit, Pharmacy Unit, Engineering Unit and Medical Record Unit.

Furthermore, this hospital has many committee and contractor to facilitate the hospital administration and operation, like Board of Visitors, infection control committee, 5S committee, assets committee, WCT Berhad and Faber Medi-Serve company.
