= Tenghilan =

Town and mukim in Sabah, Malaysia

- Town and Mukim

Other transcription(s)
  - Chinese: 丁基兰
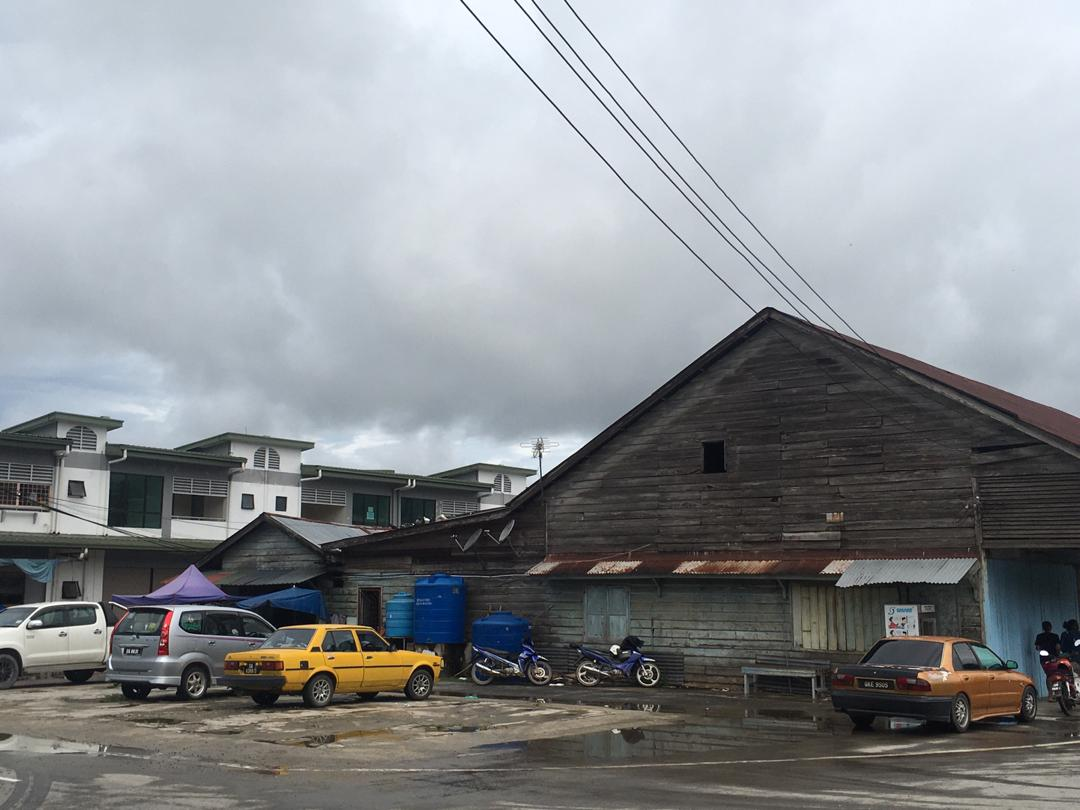
- Tenghilan Town

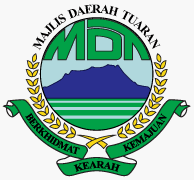
- Seal

- Location of Tenghilan Town in Tuaran District

- Location within Borneo
- Coordinates: 6°15′26.4″N 116°20′12.89″E
- Country: Malaysia
- State: Sabah
- Division: West Coast
- District: Tuaran
- Administration: Tuaran District Council; Tamparuli Sub-district office

Government
  - Body: Tuaran District Council; Tamparuli Sub-district office

Area
  - Total: 4 km^{2} (1.5 sq mi)

Population (2010)
  - Total: 203
- The population around Tenghilan town only and does not include the whole of the other villages in Tenghilan.
- Time zone: UTC+8 (MST)
- Postal code: 89260
- Area code: 088
- Neighbourhood Area: Topokon, Tuaran
- Tamu (Weekly Local Market): Thursday

Tenghilan is a small town and mukim under the administration of the Tamparuli Sub-district office. It is located in the Tuaran District of the West Coast Division of Sabah, Malaysia. The Tenghilan area is centered around a small town of the same name located near the road that connects Kota Kinabalu and Kota Belud. In 2010, its population was estimated at 203 inhabitants, mostly of Kadazan-Dusun origin. The town, which covers about 400 hectares of land, is located about 17 km northeast of Tuaran, and 25 km southwest of Kota Belud.

Tenghilan hosts a commercial district established in 1930 by British colonial authorities. Businesses in this area were developed by the Chinese and Kadazan-Dusun communities. Currently, the majority of the town's businesses are located on 8 rows of shops and are Chinese-owned. Recently, several two-story units have been built for commercial use.

== Etymology ==
Tenghilan's trade and economic centralisation began in Kampong Pengalan, as the Pengalan river was the heart of transportation. Most of the residents there are from Kadazan-Dusun origin, a people who carry out agricultural activities as the main activity of the village.

According to community sources living in the village of Tenghilan, the first settlement of Tenghilan was established in Pengkalan (Pengalan) near Kampong Bunga, happening before the founding of Tenghilan itself. At that time, most of the population of Tenghilan was Christian. As a result, during colonial rule, many British missionaries travelled to Tenghilan to assist the poor community. The village of Tenghilan is situated on relatively flat, forested terrain.

The Tenghilan community has therefore made the area around the Tarap tree a place for daily activities such as making fishing gear (Bubu, Gagan, Siud, and Gapas), Nurod (baskets for paddy fields), and twisting the buffalo rope made from Timbangan tree. The community making ploughing tools is known as Raradu (made from wood) and Surud (made from bamboo). They also make Binidang and Kobog by twisting the yarn (Costume jewellery used during the Kaamatan Festival or the ceremony of marriage) to be sheaths, making pants from plants known as Lamba, Parangi, and Gapas, weaving Rindiog and dye Rindang from the wooden Penuhu skin. The community activity also pounded the rice around the Manggilan tree.

Tangkob in Dusun language is a large circular shaped storage bin (5–15 feet in diameter and 3–6 feet in height) for rice and is made from a local tree bark, and is placed in a rice storehouse or granary called 'sulap' (in Dusun language). Tangkob is as tall as an adult person, placed under the tree of Tarap. According to the story, before the villagers begin their journey to Mindahu (to the garden or orchard), they will take the paddy from this paddy storage and return the grain of paddy (they must be peel first) to paddy storage when they return from the garden.

Thus, since the Tarap tree is very familiar with the people's life there, Kampung Tenghilan was created in the name of the tree. The plants still exist today, but unfortunately, it is just a stump where most of the stumps are located in the river and heaped up by sand and soil.

=== Administration ===
Before the Japanese occupation during the Second World War, Tenghilan was a small sub-district in Kota Belud District. After the war, Tenghilan became a mukim in Tuaran District.

== Buildings structure ==
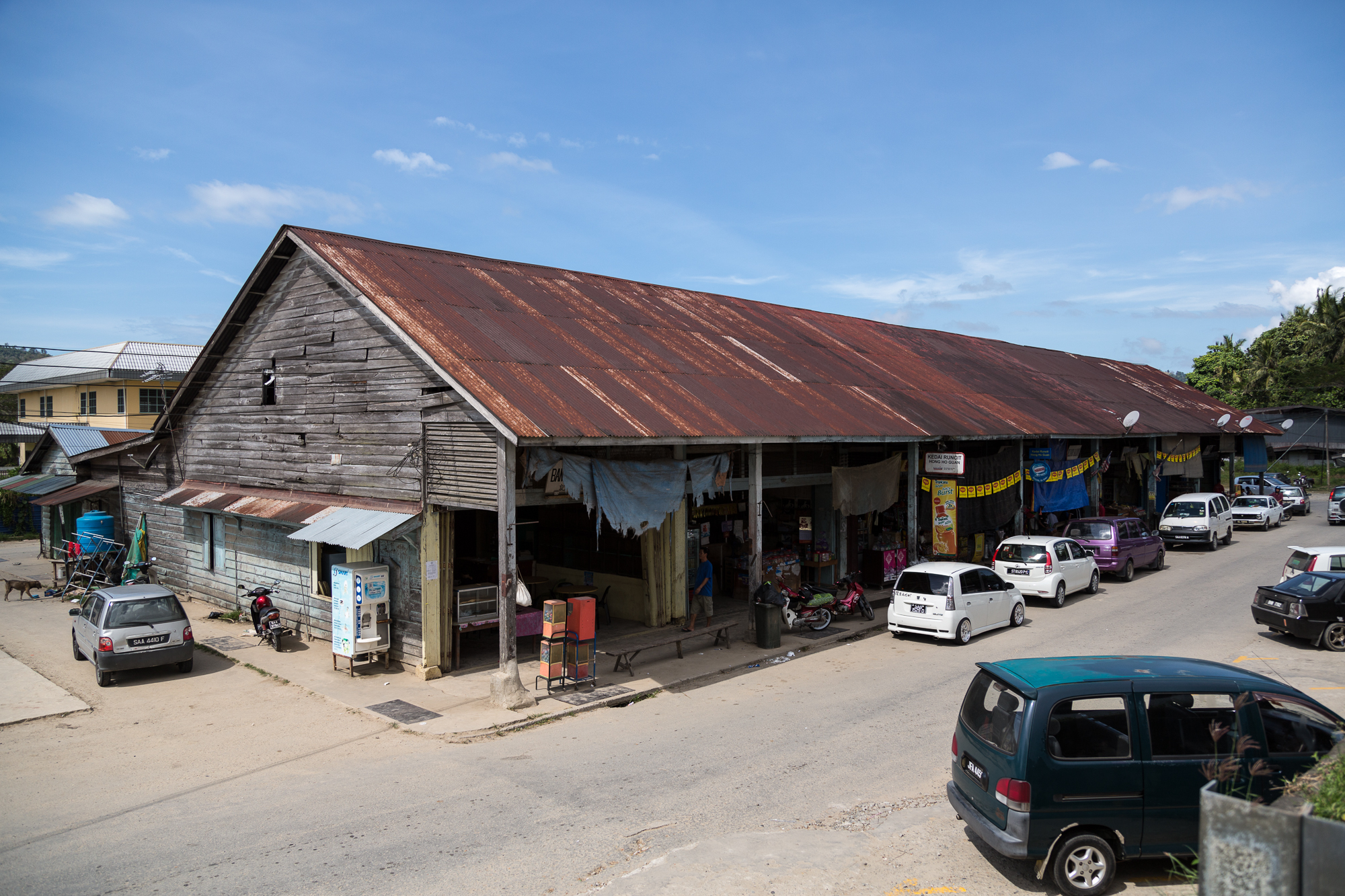
Tenghilan Town OldShoplot

Originally, Tenghilan town had only one series of wooden shop-houses built in 1930 by the British. The wooden shophouse was a double store, the upper part is the living room for the traders while the lower room is specially designed to carry out business most by Chinese. This timber shop house also has a spacious living area to accommodate other items for business as well as pedestrian areas. The first structure of the building was made of wood with a contiguous structure and the floor surface was cemented. In 1955, a series of shophouses were erected to replace the old shop building. But the old store is still intact and strong enough to carry on the business to this day. There is also a new building being built near tamu (weekly market). In 2014, the small town of Tenghilan had a new shop building with a two-story concrete building structure that provided greater convenience to the community there. Tenghilan town is listed as a historic shophouse building in Sabah.

== Mukim Tenghilan ==
Tenghilan Mukim consists of 25 villages namely;

1. Kampung Tenghilan
2. Kampung Molisau
3. Kampung Lapai
4. Kampung Linsuk
5. Kampung Lapasan
6. Kampung Rani
7. Kampung Minajur Suromboton
8. Kampung Suromboton
9. Kampung Napitas
10. Kampung Kayangat
11. Kampung Tomboilik
12. Kampung Monggis
13. Kampung Tiong Monggis
14. Kampung Koburon
15. Kampung Linungkuan
16. Kampung Gumoron
17. Kampung Tinuhan
18. Kampung Tinuhan Laut
19. Kampung Saradan
20. Kampung Saradan Laut
21. Kampung Bunga
22. Kampung Sambah
23. Kampung Betutai
24. Kampung Ladang
25. Kampung Suang Bangau
26. Tenghilan Town

== Facilities ==
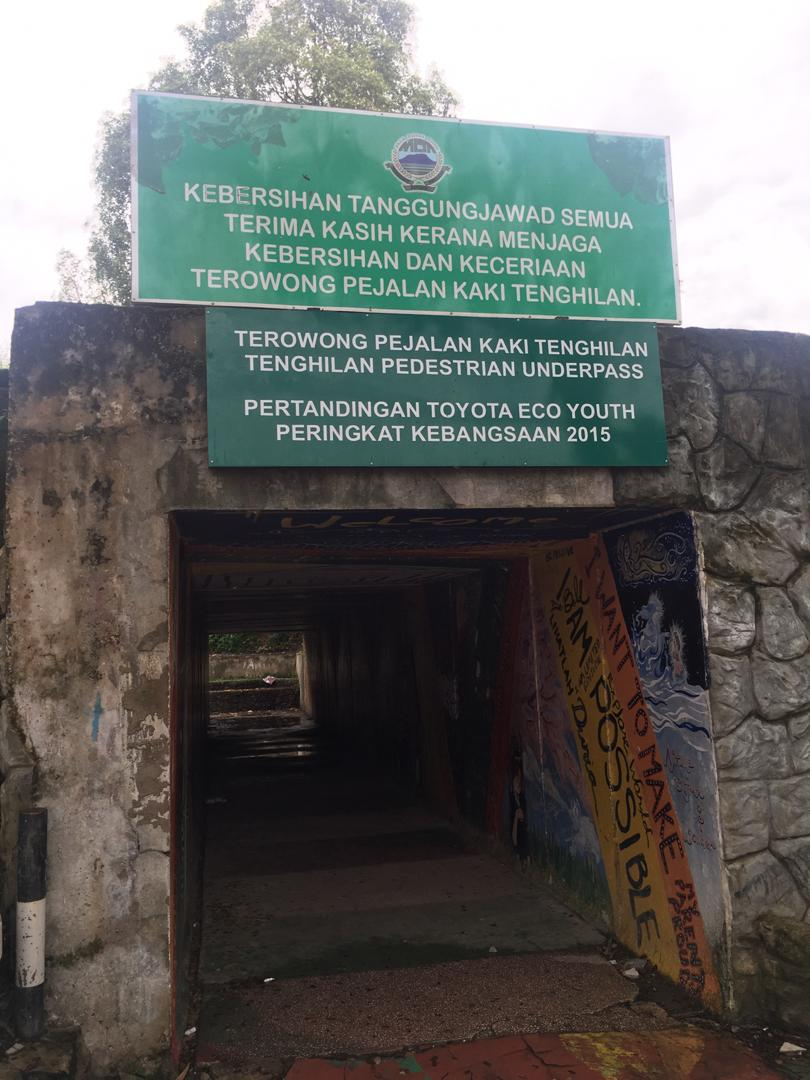
Pedestrian tunnel of Tenghilan town

Tenghilan town has a facility such as a pedestrian tunnel with a distance of approximately 18 meters for the community use. It also gives benefits to local people as a daily necessity connected something place to the town. The pedestrian tunnel was built more than 20 years ago in Tenghilan town and, easier the community doing things such as marketing of agricultural produce. The pedestrian tunnel also provides safety for the public to reduce the risk of accidents crossing the main road connecting Kota Kinabalu and Kota Belud. The efforts of a group project of students from the SMK Tenghilan, "revitalized" an abandoned pedestrian tunnel to benefit the surrounding 32 villages.

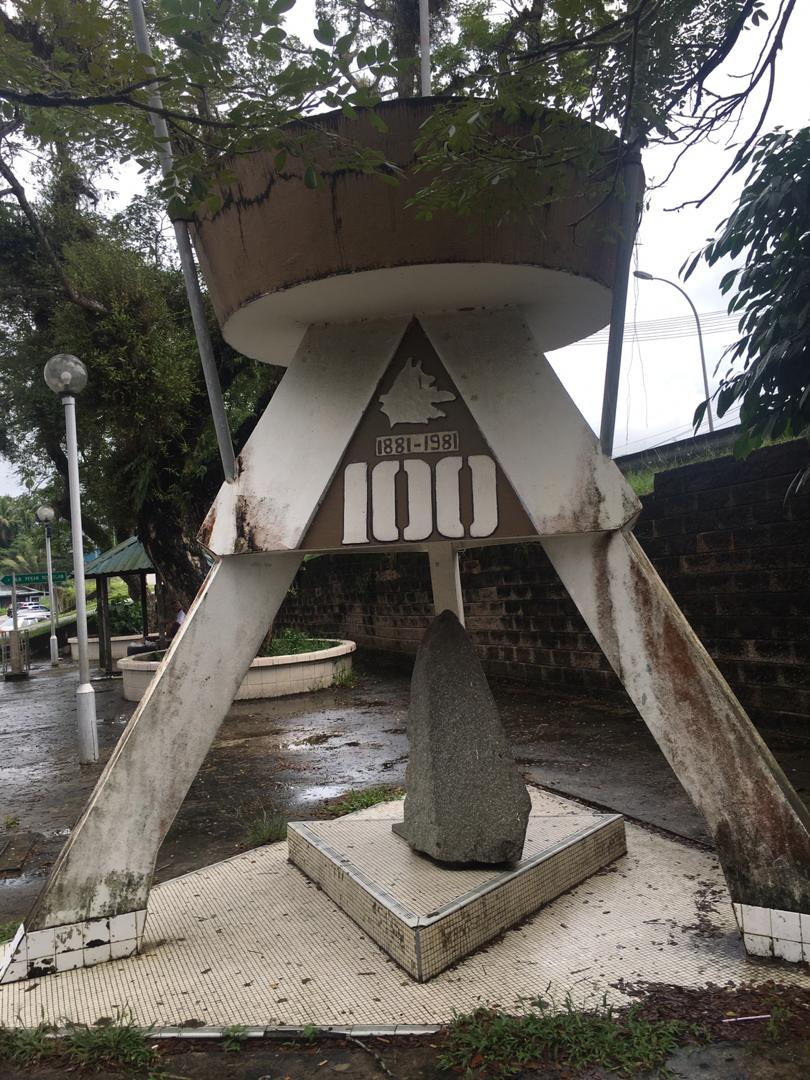
Sabah Memorial Monument of Tenghilan Town

This facility also attracts outsiders to visit the uniqueness of the pedestrian tunnel in Tenghilan. Next, "Sabah Memorial Monument", built a long time ago, was the landmark of Tenghilan as the attractiveness of the visitor. Sabah Memorial Monument of Tenghilan, known as Batu Seratus Tahun or Batu Bersumpah, is the stone that shows symbolic of agreement between the two ethnic groups in Tenghilan as a sign of peace.

== Demographics and Population ==
Tenghilan is home to a mix of indigenous communities, including the Kadazandusun and Bajau people. These indigenous groups are integral to the culture and traditions of the region. Many of the people in Tenghilan engage in farming, fishing, and handicraft production, while others work in government services or tourism-related industries. The population tends to be relatively small, given the rural nature of the town.

== Tourist attractions ==
=== Sambah River Cruise ===
Sambah River Cruise is the attraction of tourists located in Tenghilan (Tuaran district). This tour is based in Kampong Sambah. Travelers enjoy the beauty of nature, food, the beauty of Sunset and, many more.

=== Bukit Ketam ===
Ketam is a hill, hiking spot located in Kampong Lapai, Tenghilan. The view area is beautiful and can see the sea view on the top of the hill. The distance from Kota Kinabalu city to Bukit Ketam Tenghilan is approximately 52 kilometres. Meanwhile, Tenghilan town to Bukit Ketam Tenghilan is 3 kilometres.

=== Dondomon Waterfall ===
The Dondomon Waterfall is located in Kampong Rani and is a notable tourist attraction along the route to Kampong Kayangat, offering pinicking and sightseeing opportunities.

=== Bukit Merlin at Bukit Morokoling ===
The Merlin hill, known as Morokoling Hill, is a hiking spot located in Kampong Saradan, Tenghilan. The distance between Tenghilan town and Merlin hill is 5 kilometres, while from Risda route takes 7 kilometres distance to reach on the top of Merlin hill. Merlin Hill was named after a British navy landed in Kampung Saradan during the First World War that led by its captain HM Merlin. The Merlin hill is an attraction for visitors to climb and is ideal for entertaining outdoor sports for exercise.

== Culture ==
=== Tamu ===
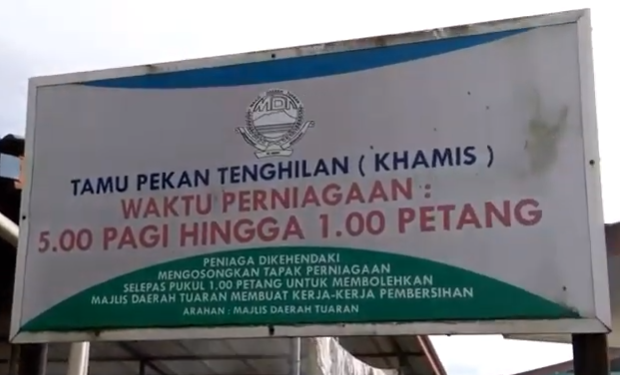
Signboard of Tamu Tenghilan

Every Thursday morning, Tamu (native open-air market) is held in Tenghilan. At the Tamu, produce, seafood, traditional food and drinks, handicrafts, and other goods from Tenghilan and the surrounding villages are bought and sold. There are also medical plants at Tamu markets, such as papaya, bitter bean, holy basil, turmeric, ginger, etlingera (known as tuhau in Sabah), star fruit, and bitter melon.

=== Music and dance ===
Linding Tinggidon Mongigol is the traditional music and dance from ethnic Dusun Tindal in Tenghilan that is presented by (Tenghilan Bamboo Sound). Tenghilan Bamboo Sound group using musical instruments such as Bamboo Flute (Suling), Sompoton instrument, and Bungkau. The music name is Linding Tinggidon, and the dance is Mongigol or Tigol Kinondi-Kondi Tenghilan. Jambatan Tamparuli song also was played using the musical instruments by Tenghilan Bamboo Sound.

=== Traditional attire ===
The traditional attire of Dusun Tindal from Tenghilan called "Sinulob" is different from the traditional dress of Dusun Tindal in Tempasuk called "Sinipak". This attire traditional is used when dancing the traditional dance "Tigol Kinondi-Kondi" and also shown during Unduk Ngadau Festival.

=== Language ===
The Dusun language is the majority spoken in Tenghilan. The dialect of Dusun is unique and different in terms of words, syllables, pronunciation or intonation, compared to those of Tuaran, Tamparuli, Kiulu, and Ranau.

Language Comparison
No.	Bahasa Melayu (Malay)	English	Dusun (Normal)	Dusun Tenghilan	Sama–Bajaw
1	Padi	Paddy	Parai	Parey	Pahi
2	Pergi	Go	Mongoi	Mongey	Pinggo/Pi
3	Kucing	Cat	Tingau	Tungo	Kuting

Thus, the Dusun language showed the people identity from Tenghilan, and the Bajaw language (Bajau) is also used in Tenghilan.

=== Mitatabang ===
The Mitatabang is a culture of communities such as in Kampong Molisau Tenghilan known as "Gotong-Royong" or helps each other/cooperation and, this Mitatabang activity is doing by turn work. There two associations do the Mitatabang activity, which is the KDCA association and MASA association (Persatuan Koisaan Piombolutan Molisau-Saradan). The practice of Mitababang culture must be maintained so it can be continued, by the villagers from the tradition of the ancestors.

The Mitatabang culture has many benefits to the community such as;

1. Enhancing the relationship bond among the community in the village.

2. Encouraging and attracting the community to join the Mitatabang activity, especially the youth.

3. Education and experience for the youth about how to work in the paddy field and so on.

4. Promoting the Mitatabang culture to outsiders, especially visitors.

5. Helping the community by providing tools such as a hoe, chainsaw, grasscutter, wheelbarrow, canopy, and other conveniences.

6. Having a community meeting to discuss problems and issues in the village.

7. Actively participating in the association to give benefit to society by the build some facilities and so on.

8. Saving time and cost by doing projects regarding agriculture activities and others in the village.

Mitatabang also can be seen in another village within Tenghilan, such as Kampung Rani. Mitatabang organised by a Koisaan, an NGO in that village itself. They conduct activities for community benefits such as; paddy harvesting, wedding planning & preparations, harvest festival, funeral, and some churches program. Next, they also conduct environmental sustainability projects such as river cleaning, zero trash campaign along the Turug Burilakon Rani road.
