= Tuaran =

- Town and district capital
- Pekan Tuaran; Tuaran Town

Other transcription(s)
  - Jawi: توارن
  - Chinese: 斗亚兰 (Simplified) 鬥亞蘭 (Traditional); Dòuyàlán (Hanyu Pinyin) dêu3 a3 lan2 (Hakka)
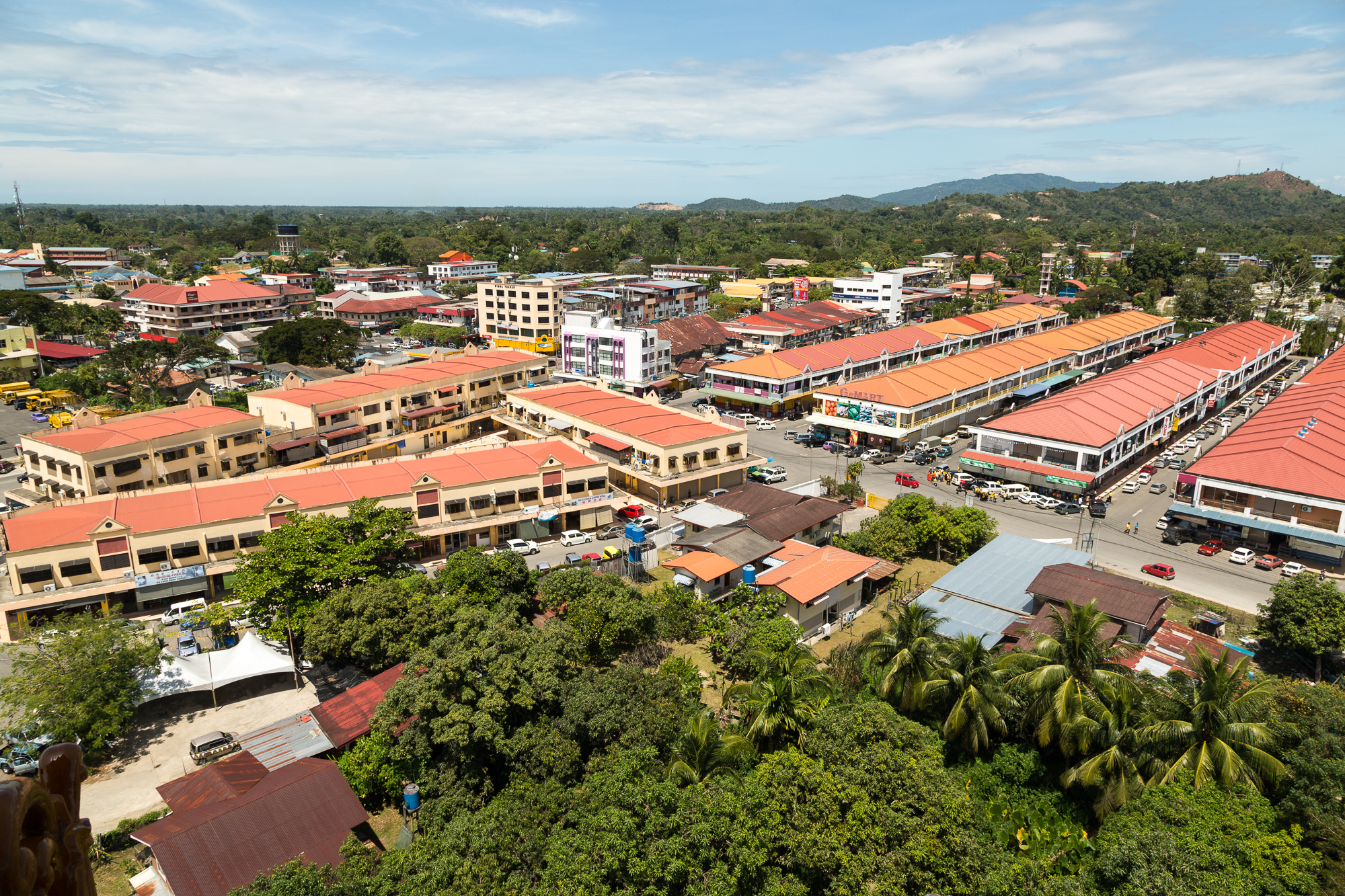
- Tuaran town centre.

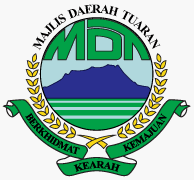
- Seal
- Etymology: Tawaran
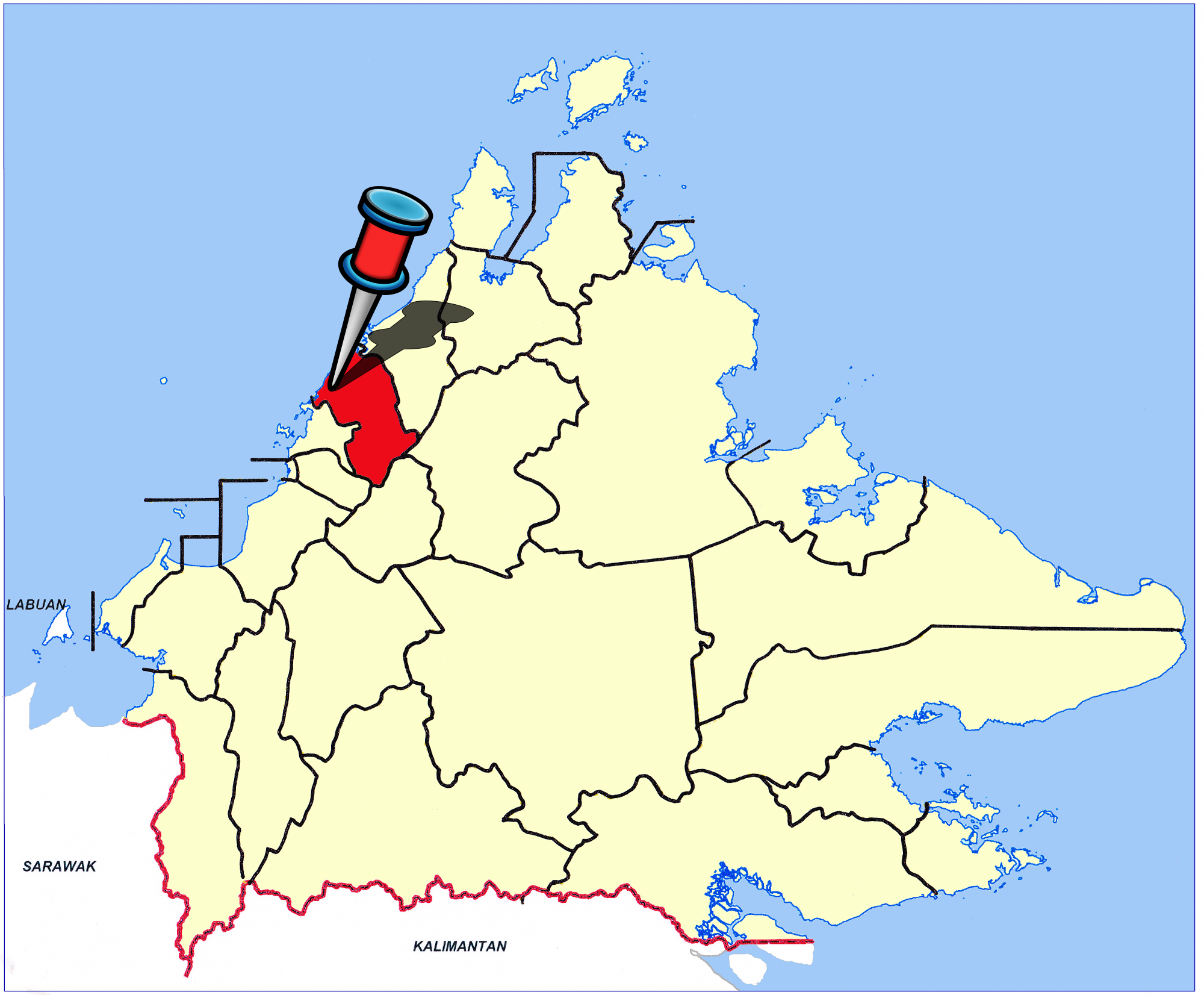
- Coordinates: 6°11′00″N 116°14′00″E
- Country: Malaysia
- State: Sabah
- Division: West Coast
- District: Tuaran
- Administration: Tuaran District Council

Government
  - Body: Tuaran District Council
  - District Officer: Herman Tunggiging
  - Executive Officer: Jamlin Bin Ladin
  - MP: Yang Berhormat Datuk Seri Panglima Wilfred Madius Tangau (UPKO) (Tuaran)

Area
  - Total: 1,166.00000 km^{2} (450.195117 sq mi)

Population (2019)
  - Total: 128,200
- Time zone: UTC+8 (MST)
- Postal code: 89208
- Area code: 088
- Neighborhood Area: Tamparuli, Tenghilan, Topokon
- Tamu (Weekly Local Market): Sunday
- Number plate: SA (1980-2018); SY (2018-2023); SJ (2023-)
- Website: mdtuaran.sabah.gov.my/index.php pdtuaran.sabah.gov.my

Tuaran (Malay: Pekan Tuaran) is the town and capital of the Tuaran District in the West Coast Division of Sabah, Malaysia. It is located 34 kilometres (21 mi) north of the state capital Kota Kinabalu, and is strategically situated along the main highway linking Kota Kinabalu with the north of Sabah. Tuaran is famous for its 9-storey Ling-San Pagoda Tower, which serves as a symbol and landmark of the town. Tuaran town also famous for its Tuaran fried noodles, a dish that has been passed down through generations. Many people visit Tuaran specifically to try this delicious noodle dish, as it is made with a special kind of noodle that is different from the usual ones. Its population was estimated to be around 128,200 in 2019 with half the population consisting of ethnic Dusuns, most of the Lotud ethnic subgroup as well of Bajau descent. The remainder is mostly of the Malaysian Chinese community, particularly from the Hakka subgroup and Malay.

This town is a popular stopover destination for tourists and people traveling to and from northern Sabah cities such as Kudat, Kota Marudu, Kota Belud, and Tenghilan, as well as those on their way to Kota Kinabalu. Tuaran has experienced significant urban expansion, but recently, this growth has faced some obstacles due to the limited topography of Tuaran, as the town is surrounded by rivers. The town is bordered on three sides by the Tuaran River.

== Etymology ==
The existence of Tuaran in colonial records can be traced as far back as 1813, in official letters written by Sir Stamford Raffles, the then British Governor of Java, seeking permission to accept the Sultan of Brunei's invitation to deal with piracy issues at 'Jawaran' in the north of Borneo.

'Jawaran' is a corruption of the Malay word tawaran. Tawaran has two meanings; the first meaning is 'fresh water', referring to the importance of the Tuaran area as a source of freshwater for the locality. The second meaning is 'to bargain', which refers to the trading activities which had been taking place in the Tuaran area even before British colonisation commenced in 1884.

Another consideration is Tuaran came from word 'taaran' which mean river by Dusun ethnic.

== History ==
Based on available historical records, Tuaran is among the historically significant settlement and trading areas of Sabah. Its proposed identification with the medieval camphor-producing centre of Tawaran, together with later accounts of its coastal settlements and indigenous trading networks, suggests a long history of commercial and cultural interaction in the region. (Note: The word "tawaran" in the Dusun language means "corn", while other Dusun dialects use the term luong for corn.)

=== Tawaran ===
The earliest record of Tawaran appears in the written records of Persian explorer Ibn Rustah who wrote a journal of his trip to Southeast Asia in 903 AD, in which he says that there is an island called "Tawaran". British scholar G. R. Tibbetts suggested Tawaran was located near the Durian Islands, southwest of Singapore. British historian Robert Nicholl proposed identifying the medieval place-name Tawaran with present-day Tuaran in Sabah, suggesting that it was an early camphor-producing centre in northwestern Borneo. He linked the name to Atawaran (L'île de Atawaran), recorded in Arabic geographical literature, which was transliterated by French orientalist Gabriel Ferrand in his 1913 compilation as the name of an island where camphor trees were found.

Nicholl associated Tawaran with the Kingdom of Muja, whose ruler was reportedly involved in warfare against the Chinese, according to Al-Ya'qubi. In the 9th century, Nicholl proposed that Chinese forces established a military garrison at Tawaran to exploit the region's camphor resources. He connected this presence with the Chinese conquest of the Mountains of Camphor described by Ibn Sa'id.

Subsequently, Tawaran was controlled by Srivijaya (suzerainty), as an island that was renowned for producing a particular species of camphor highly prized by merchants, reportedly valued at more than gold. (Note: Northwestern Borneo, particularly Tawaran, was never part of Srivijaya but maintained political ties with the kingdom, possibly amounting to subordination or suzerainty.) Nicholl further proposed that, following the extension of Srivijayan influence to the region, camphor from Tawaran was exported to Palembang rather than sent directly to China, marking a shift in its trade route around 835. Nicholl's interpretation was subsequently corrected by Kurz, who argued that the reference concerned the discovery or reporting of camphor at Tawaran, rather than a transfer of political control to Palembang.

Nicholl also proposed a separate episode of Chinese-connected military activity in the late 13th century, when Central Asian Turks allegedly arrived in Tawaran as Chinese mercenaries during the Yuan expeditionary period. According to his reconstruction, these mercenaries became stranded in the region and remained there into the first half of the 14th century.

The place-names Tawaran (also transliterated as Atawaran or Tuwaran) and Haranj were mentioned repeatedly in medieval Arabic and Persian geographical literature in connection with the camphor-producing lands of Southeast Asia. Drawing on a shared pool of 9th-century and 10th-century merchant reports—stemming from Ibn Khurradadhbih (c. 846–885) and the lost geography of Al-Jayhani (c. 914–922)—Borneo was documented as a camphor source within the maritime sphere of Srivijaya by Ibn Rustah (c. 903–913), Al-Qazwini (c. 1275), Abu al-Fida (c. 1310–1331) and Al-Dimashqi (c. 1300–1327), alongside related descriptions by Ibn Saʿid (c. 1250). According to historian Robert Nicholl, these accounts refer to the northwestern coastal strip of Borneo known locally as Saba (which he equated with Arabic Zabaj)—identifying Haranj with Sabah's west coast below Mount Kinabalu and Tawaran with Tuaran. (Note: In the 14th century, around the time Arab geographers Abu al-Fida and Al-Dimashqi were writing about camphor, Sumatra and Java were already known by their respective names. However, drawing on earlier geographical accounts without fully recognising their original geographical context, they perpetuated older place-names whose locations had become unclear. Among these were Zabaj and Haranj, which they associated with Sumatra or Java, despite earlier accounts describing a separate landmass farther north in the South China Sea. According to Nicholl, that land was Borneo, particularly the regions of Brunei and Tawaran, which were renowned sources of highly prized camphor.) Camphor from Southeast Asia was highly valued in medieval international trade, with Borneo and Sumatra recognised as important sources of the aromatic resin. Indigenous communities, particularly the Rungus and Tambunan Dusun, collected camphor from forest trees for trade through regional trading networks, as documented in later historical accounts.

=== Arrival of the Bajau ===
According to one migration theory, the West Coast Bajau, also known as the Samah, originated from the Johor–Riau region before migrating to the west coast of North Borneo. Historical accounts place their settlements along the coast, particularly around Mengkabong, by the 18th century. They established coastal and riverside communities, with fishing, agriculture and trade forming important parts of their livelihoods. Bajau traders also supplied marine products and other goods to communities in the hinterland. In Tuaran, the Bajau lived alongside indigenous Dusun communities, including the Lotud, although relations between coastal and inland groups were not always peaceful. Historical accounts also describe instances of intergroup conflict, as well as some mixing and cultural interaction between communities.

== Administration ==
=== Tuaran District Council ===
The Tuaran District Council is the administration within the Tuaran district, covering administrative areas such as Pantai Dalit, Sulaman, Tamparuli, and Kiulu. It was established on 1 January 1958, under the "Rural Government Ordinance Cap. 132" and began operating as a Local Authority on 1 January 1962, under the Local Authorities Ordinance 1961 and the Tuaran District Council Deed 1961.

The administrative town of the Tuaran District Council is located in the town of Tuaran. Previously, the council's office was in the Small Secretariat Building in Tuaran. In 1994, the proposal to construct a new office complex for the Tuaran District Council was approved, and construction began. The new building, named the Tuaran District Council Complex, was completed and occupied by the end of 1997.

==== District Officer Tuaran ====
The current District Officer of Tuaran is Herman Tunggiging.

List of Names officer of the Tuaran District Office
Num	Date of service	Officer's name
1	1980 Until 1982	Datuk Masidi Manjun
2	1982 Until 1985	Yahya Ahmad Shah
3	1985	Abdul Rahman Lo
4	1985 Until 1988	Datuk Jahid Jahim
5	1989 Until 1992	Ariffin Gadait
6	1992 Until 1996	Udin Dullah
7	1996 Until 1997	HJ. Uda Sulai
8	1997 Until 2010	Awang Shamsi HJ. Jamih
9	2010 Until 2013	Madiyem Layapan
10	2014 Until 2017	A.M. Ibnu HJ. A.K. Baba
11	2017 Until 2021	Mohd Sofian Alfian Nair
12	2021 Until 2022	Sadan Hussain
13	2022 Until 2023	Syahrin Samsir
14	2023 Until 2024	Hadzlan HJ. Jablee
15	2024 Current	Herman Tunggiging

== Geography ==
Position of Tuaran Town near other areas;

== Cuisine ==
=== Bahar wine ===
The Dusun Lotud people of Tuaran produce a traditional liquor called bahar (tuak) made from coconut sap mixed with a kind of tree bark known locally as rosok which colours the sap red. Bahar has been scientifically proven to be rich in antioxidants. However, it is extremely pungent and spoils very quickly, usually within one day.

=== Tuaran mee ===
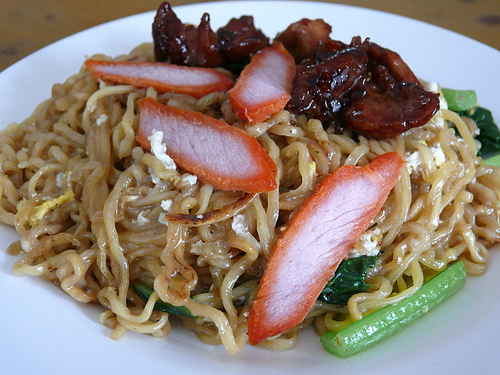
Tuaran mee.

Tuaran mee (Traditional Chinese: 鬥亞蘭面; Hakka: Diu ah lan men), which literally translates as 'Tuaran noodles', is a noodle dish created by the Hakka Chinese community of Tuaran. The noodles are made from a batter consisting of egg yolk and flour. They are fried for five to ten minutes in high heat, causing the bottom part of the noodles to become crunchy. Local vegetables are added during frying. Before Tuaran mee is served, it is usually garnished with slices of sweetened Chinese roast pork (Traditional Chinese: 叉燒; Hakka: cha sau) and fried egg rolls (Traditional Chinese: 春捲; Hakka: chun kien).

=== Bambangan pickles ===
Bambangan pickles is a traditional relish consisting the flesh of the fruit preserved in brine. Traditionally served as a side dish at any meal; often best served with other traditional dish such as Pinasakan.

== Culture ==
=== Tamu ===
Every Sunday morning, a tamu (native open-air market) is held in Tuaran town. At the tamu, produce, seafood, traditional food and drinks, handicrafts and other goods from Tuaran and the surrounding villages are bought and sold.

== Places of interest ==
Borneo Ant House is a mini theme park located at Tuaran-Kota Belud Road. It was open in July 2017 and suitable for family outing.

Chanteek Borneo Indigenous Museum is a mini museum located at Tamparuli Road. It was open in August 2014 and the exhibits are miniature dolls of Barbie size dressed in traditional costumes from Malaysia. It is suitable for educational and for arts and cultural lovers.

Sabandar Cowboy Town is another mini theme park with focus on horse riding activity. It is located near the Sabandar Beach.

Rumah Terbalik or the Upside-down House is an attraction located at Tamparuli Road. It has attracted thousands visitors since its opening in 2012. The major attraction is a Bajau house constructed upside down.

Linangkit Cultural Village (also referred to as LCV) is a cultural attraction which is located in Kampung Selupuh Tuaran. The name Linangkit is a traditional Lotud embroidery with patterns usually in color red, orange, etc. to cover up the seams between fabrics which usually used also as a design element in Lotud traditional costumes. The cultural village is the one and only you could go for in order to explore and be exposed to Lotud traditions and also cultures here in Sabah. Moreover, you will save a chance to personally see the actions and visions of how the old folks of Lotud lived in the olden times. Other things you're fortunate to see include handicraft-making demonstrations, traditional food preparations, traditional fish netting, river cruise, firefly watching, and tapioca plucking.

For outdoor activity such as white water rafting, the Kiulu River at the sub-district Kiulu is one of the preferred choice in Sabah for grade I-II rapids.

The 9-Storey Pagoda Ling San is one of the main tourist attractions in Tuaran. Visitor can climb to the top and get a beautiful view of the town.

Tuaran Crocodile Farm is a home for more or less a thousand crocodiles, located just a few kilometres from the town.

== Sister Towns ==
=== International ===
- Calabanga, Camarines Sur, Philippines
