= Tuaran District =

- District
- Daerah Tuaran

Other transcription(s)
  - Jawi: داءيره توارن
  - Chinese: 斗亚兰县 (Simplified) 鬥亞蘭縣 (Traditional); Dòuyàlán xiàn (Hanyu Pinyin) dêu3 a3 lan2 yan4 (Hakka)
  - Tamil: துவாரான் மாவட்டம் Tuvārāṉ māvaṭṭam (Transliteration)
  - Kadazandusun: Watas Tuaran
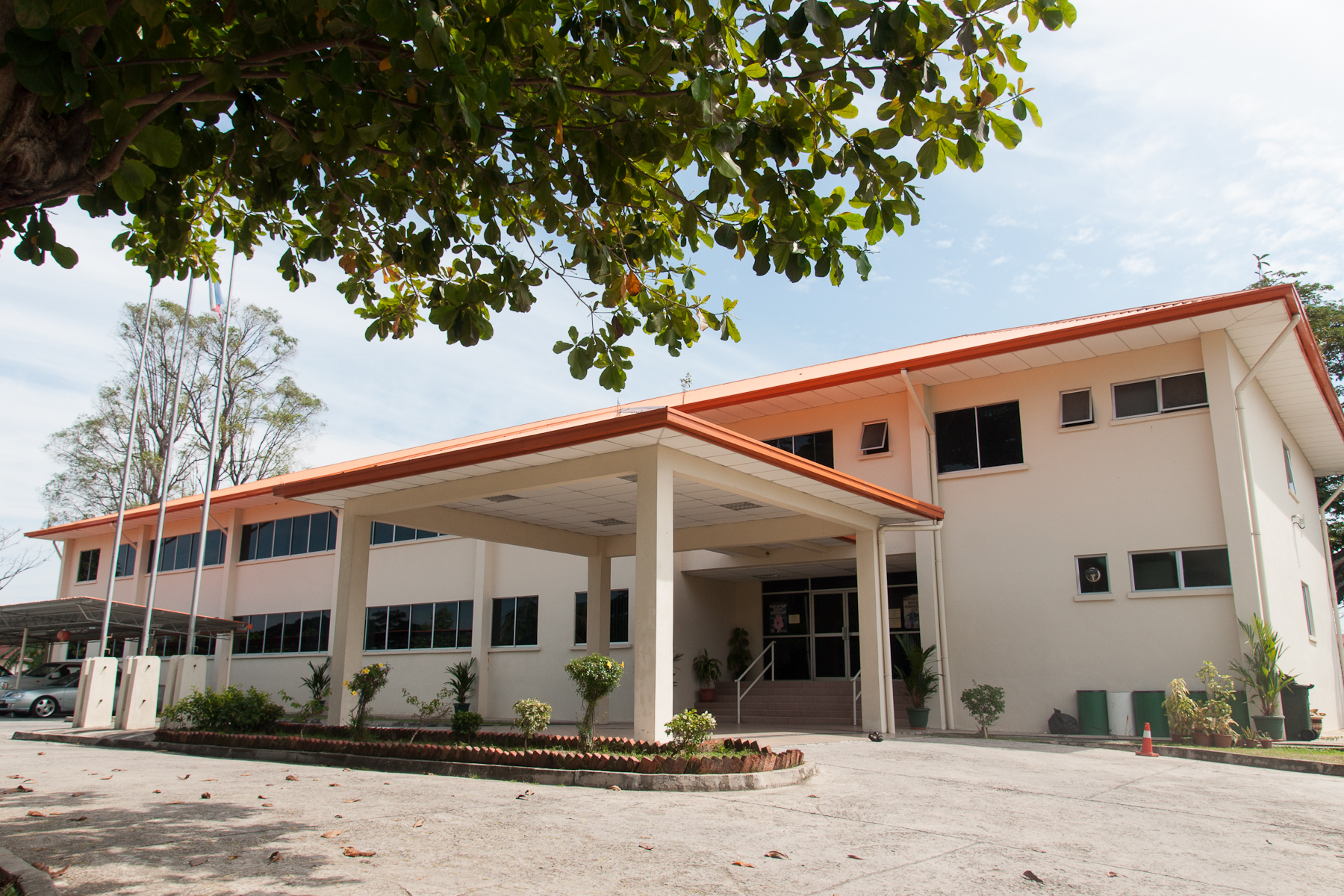
- Tuaran District Office

- Seal
- Interactive map of Tuaran District
- Coordinates: 6°11′00″N 116°14′00″E
- Country: Malaysia
- State: Sabah
- Division: West Coast
- Administration: Tuaran District Council

Government
  - District Officer: Herman Tunggiging
  - Executive Officer: Jamlin Bin Ladin
  - MP: Wilfred Madius Tangau (UPKO)
  - MLA: Wilfred Madius Tangau (UPKO) (Tamparuli); Hajiji Noor (GRS-GAGASAN) (Sulaman); Joniston Bangkuai (GRS-PBS) (Kiulu); Jasnih Daya (GRS-GAGASAN) (Pantai Dalit)

Area
  - Total: 1,170 km^{2} (450 sq mi)

Population (2020)
  - Total: 135,665
  - Density: 116/km^{2} (300/sq mi)
- Time zone: UTC+8 (MST)
- Postal code: 89XXX
- Area code: 088
- Website: mdtuaran.sbh.gov.my pdtuaran.sbh.gov.my

The Tuaran District (Malay: Daerah Tuaran) is an administrative district in the Malaysian state of Sabah, part of the West Coast Division which includes the districts of Kota Belud, Kota Kinabalu, Papar, Penampang, Putatan, Ranau and Tuaran. The capital of the district is in Tuaran Town and the administrative area includes the entire boundary of Tuaran District, covering an area of 116,500 hectares (287,875 acres). Tuaran also one of the districts in Sabah located near Kota Kinabalu, and it is considered part of the Greater Kota Kinabalu area.

St. Andrews Anglican church was consecrated on 12 November 1967 by Roland Koh.

== Etymology ==
The origin of the name of "Tuaran" is somewhat uncertain as a settlement had existed since before the arrival of the British. One of the earliest recorded evidence of the use of Tuaran is through the letter of Stamford Raffles. After he became the governor of Java in 1813, he requested the British secretary in India to give him permission to enter the northern Borneo area after being invited by the Sultanate of Brunei. The Sultan of Brunei request help from Raffles as the waters around Jawaran (Tuaran) and Jampasoo (Tempasuk) have been infected with piracy. The letter stated:

The present Sultan of Borneo Proper (Brunei) is understood to be well disposed not given the encouragement of piratical enterprise, notwithstanding the shelter is accorded to pirates in almost every river in his domain, a number of petty states having arisen beyond the reach of his authority and control. The most prominent of these states are the states of Jawaran (Tuaran) and Jampasoo (Tempasuk) to the northward of Borneo Proper……… It has been reported that Jawaran send about 50 prows (perahu) belonging to this states is estimated about 150 with from one to two hundred guns. The large prows armed with 10 feet long probably 12 and 18 paunders. Their crews consisting 80-200 men. The lanoons are the most considerable, formidable of these eastern pirates. There is little doubts that we the (East India Company) should be justified in the immediate destruction of these prows.

== History ==
Based on available historical records, Tuaran is among the historically significant settlement and trading areas of Sabah. Its proposed identification with the medieval camphor-producing centre of Tawaran, together with later accounts of its coastal settlements and indigenous trading networks, suggests a long history of commercial and cultural interaction in the region. (Note: The word "tawaran" in the Dusun language means "corn", while other Dusun dialects use the term luong for corn.)

=== Tawaran ===
The earliest record of Tawaran appears in the written records of Persian explorer Ibn Rustah who wrote a journal of his trip to Southeast Asia in 903 AD, in which he says that there is an island called "Tawaran". British scholar G. R. Tibbetts suggested Tawaran was located near the Durian Islands, southwest of Singapore. British historian Robert Nicholl proposed identifying the medieval place-name Tawaran with present-day Tuaran in Sabah, suggesting that it was an early camphor-producing centre in northwestern Borneo. He linked the name to Atawaran (L'île de Atawaran), recorded in Arabic geographical literature, which was transliterated by French orientalist Gabriel Ferrand in his 1913 compilation as the name of an island where camphor trees were found.

Nicholl associated Tawaran with the Kingdom of Muja, whose ruler was reportedly involved in warfare against the Chinese, according to Al-Ya'qubi. In the 9th century, Nicholl proposed that Chinese forces established a military garrison at Tawaran to exploit the region's camphor resources. He connected this presence with the Chinese conquest of the Mountains of Camphor described by Ibn Sa'id.

Subsequently, Tawaran was controlled by Srivijaya (suzerainty), as an island that was renowned for producing a particular species of camphor highly prized by merchants, reportedly valued at more than gold. (Note: Northwestern Borneo, particularly Tawaran, was never part of Srivijaya but maintained political ties with the kingdom, possibly amounting to subordination or suzerainty.) Nicholl further proposed that, following the extension of Srivijayan influence to the region, camphor from Tawaran was exported to Palembang rather than sent directly to China, marking a shift in its trade route around 835. Nicholl's interpretation was subsequently corrected by Kurz, who argued that the reference concerned the discovery or reporting of camphor at Tawaran, rather than a transfer of political control to Palembang.

Nicholl also proposed a separate episode of Chinese-connected military activity in the late 13th century, when Central Asian Turks allegedly arrived in Tawaran as Chinese mercenaries during the Yuan expeditionary period. According to his reconstruction, these mercenaries became stranded in the region and remained there into the first half of the 14th century.

The place-names Tawaran (also transliterated as Atawaran or Tuwaran) and Haranj were mentioned repeatedly in medieval Arabic and Persian geographical literature in connection with the camphor-producing lands of Southeast Asia. Drawing on a shared pool of 9th-century and 10th-century merchant reports—stemming from Ibn Khurradadhbih (c. 846–885) and the lost geography of Al-Jayhani (c. 914–922)—Borneo was documented as a camphor source within the maritime sphere of Srivijaya by Ibn Rustah (c. 903–913), Al-Qazwini (c. 1275), Abu al-Fida (c. 1310–1331) and Al-Dimashqi (c. 1300–1327), alongside related descriptions by Ibn Saʿid (c. 1250). According to historian Robert Nicholl, these accounts refer to the northwestern coastal strip of Borneo known locally as Saba (which he equated with Arabic Zabaj)—identifying Haranj with Sabah's west coast below Mount Kinabalu and Tawaran with Tuaran. (Note: In the 14th century, around the time Arab geographers Abu al-Fida and Al-Dimashqi were writing about camphor, Sumatra and Java were already known by their respective names. However, drawing on earlier geographical accounts without fully recognising their original geographical context, they perpetuated older place-names whose locations had become unclear. Among these were Zabaj and Haranj, which they associated with Sumatra or Java, despite earlier accounts describing a separate landmass farther north in the South China Sea. According to Nicholl, that land was Borneo, particularly the regions of Brunei and Tawaran, which were renowned sources of highly prized camphor.) Camphor from Southeast Asia was highly valued in medieval international trade, with Borneo and Sumatra recognised as important sources of the aromatic resin. Indigenous communities, particularly the Rungus and Tambunan Dusun, collected camphor from forest trees for trade through regional trading networks, as documented in later historical accounts.

=== Arrival of the Bajau ===
According to one migration theory, the West Coast Bajau, also known as the Samah, originated from the Johor–Riau region before migrating to the west coast of North Borneo. Historical accounts place their settlements along the coast, particularly around Mengkabong, by the 18th century. They established coastal and riverside communities, with fishing, agriculture and trade forming important parts of their livelihoods. Bajau traders also supplied marine products and other goods to communities in the hinterland. In Tuaran, the Bajau lived alongside indigenous Dusun communities, including the Lotud, although relations between coastal and inland groups were not always peaceful. Historical accounts also describe instances of intergroup conflict, as well as some mixing and cultural interaction between communities.

== Administration ==
Map of Tuaran District

Mukims of Tuaran District

=== Tuaran District Council ===
The Tuaran District Council oversees the administration of various areas within Tuaran district, including Pantai Dalit, Sulaman, Tamparuli, and Kiulu. It was established on 1 January 1958, under the "Rural Government Ordinance Cap. 132" and began operating as a Local Authority on 1 January 1962, under the Local Authorities Ordinance 1961 and the Tuaran District Council Deed 1961.

The administrative center of the Tuaran District Council is situated in the town of Tuaran. Prior to this, the council operated from the Small Secretariat Building in the town. In 1994, the proposal to build a new office complex for the council was greenlit, and construction work commenced. By the end of 1997, the new building, known as the Tuaran District Council Complex, was finished and officially occupied.

=== Administrative division ===
Tuaran District includes:

Tuaran District
| Area | Mukim (Section) |
| Sulaman | Mukim Tambalang |
| Sulaman | Mukim Serusop |
| Sulaman | Mukim Indai |
| Pantai Dalit | Mukim Berungis |
| Pantai Dalit | Mukim Mengkabong |
| Pantai Dalit | Mukim Tuaran Bandar |
| Tamparuli | Mukim Tamparuli |
| Tamparuli | Mukim Tenghilan |
| Tamparuli | Mukim Topokon |
| Tamparuli | Mukim Gayaratau/Rungus |
| Kiulu | Mukim Ulu |
| Kiulu | Mukim Tengah |
| Kiulu | Mukim Lembah |
| Kiulu | Mukim Pantai |
| Kiulu | Mukim Nabalu |
| Kiulu | Mukim Pekan |

=== Members of Sabah State Legislative Assembly ===
| State constituency | Member of Sabah State Legislative Assembly | Party |
|---|---|---|
| S12 Sulaman | Hajiji Noor | GRS-GAGASAN |
| S13 Pantai Dalit | Jasnih Daya | GRS-GAGASAN |
| S14 Tamparuli | Jahid Jahim | GRS-PBS |
| S15 Kiulu | Joniston Bangkuai | GRS-PBS |

=== Towns ===
There are 4 Towns in Tuaran District:

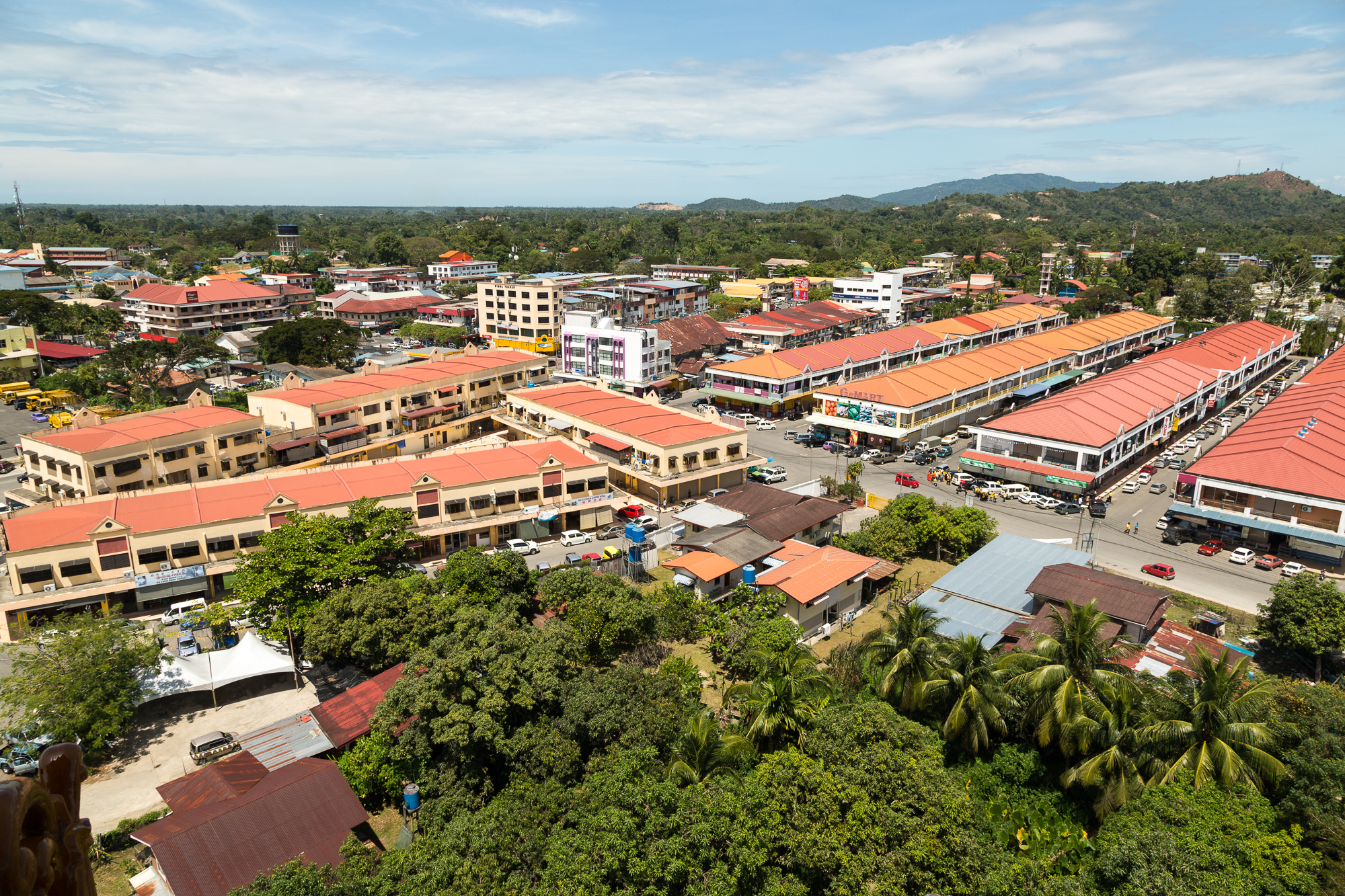
Tuaran Town

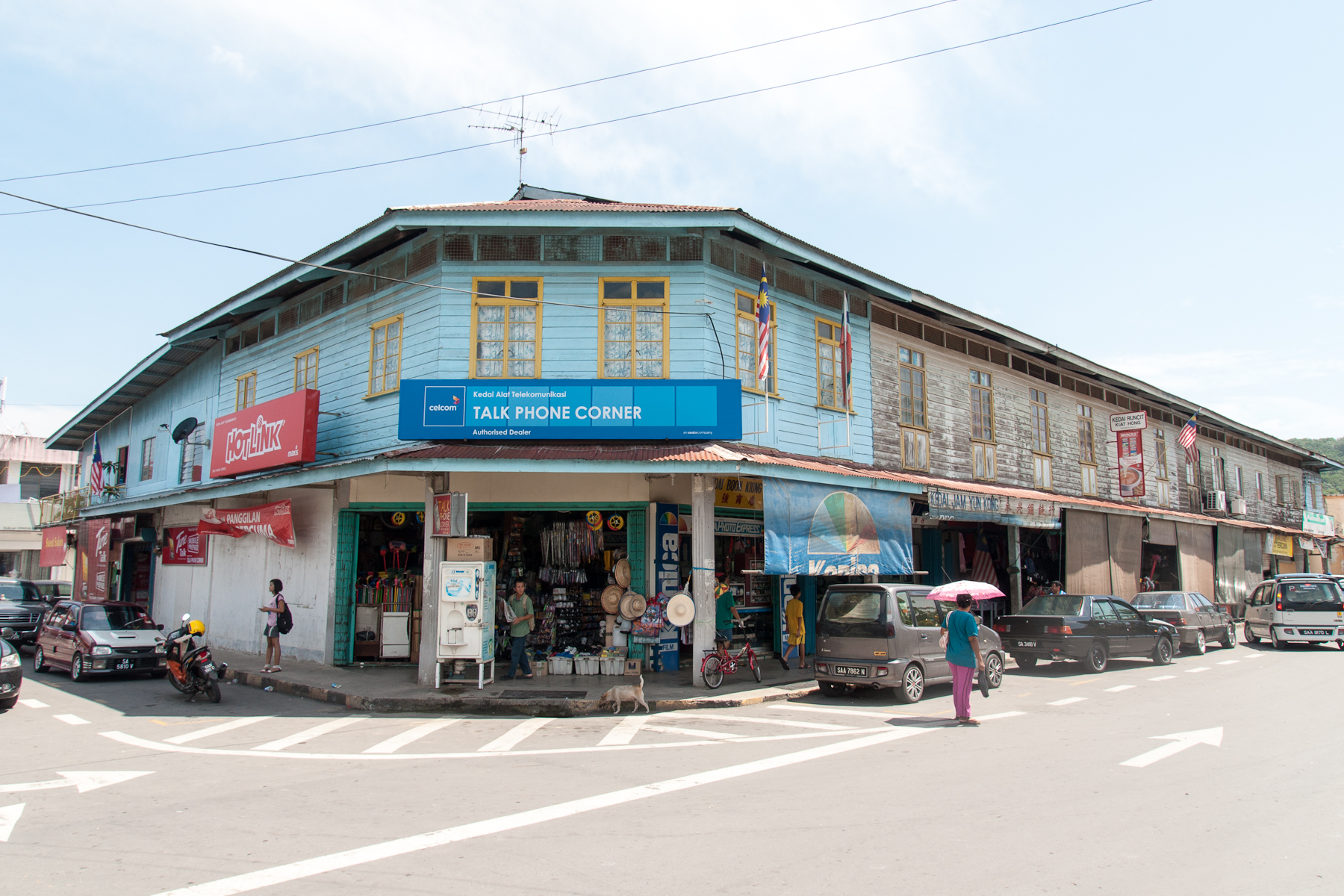
Tamparuli Town

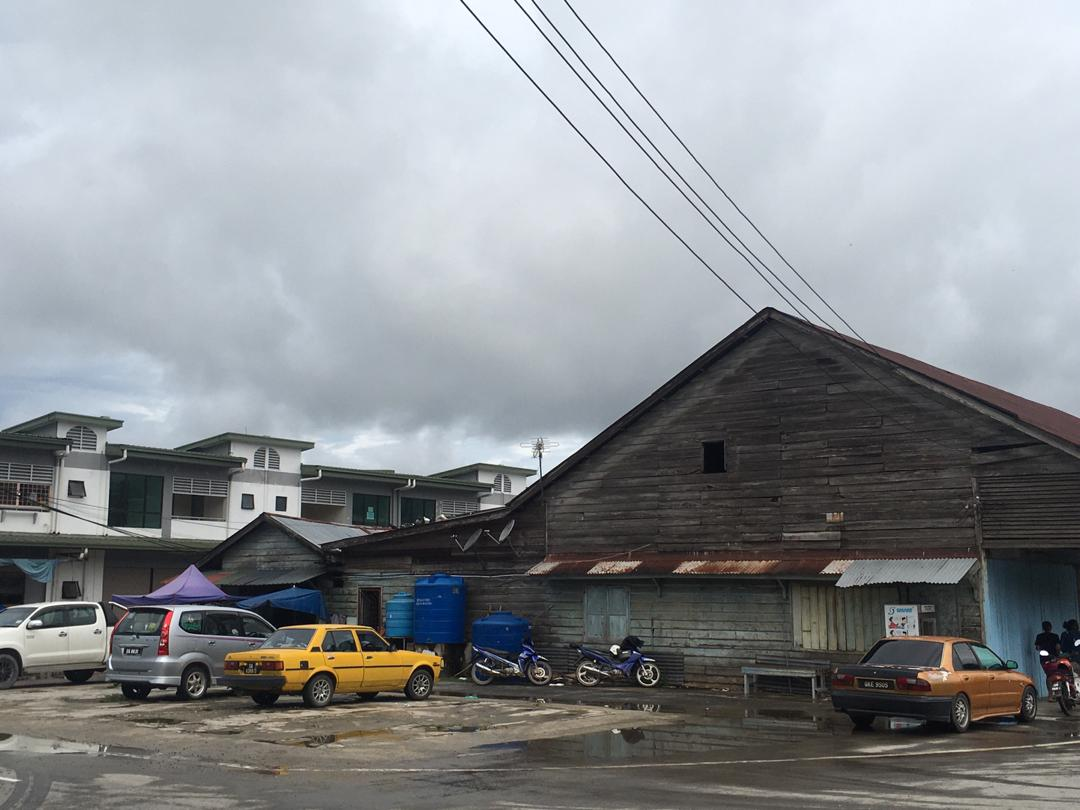
Tenghilan Town

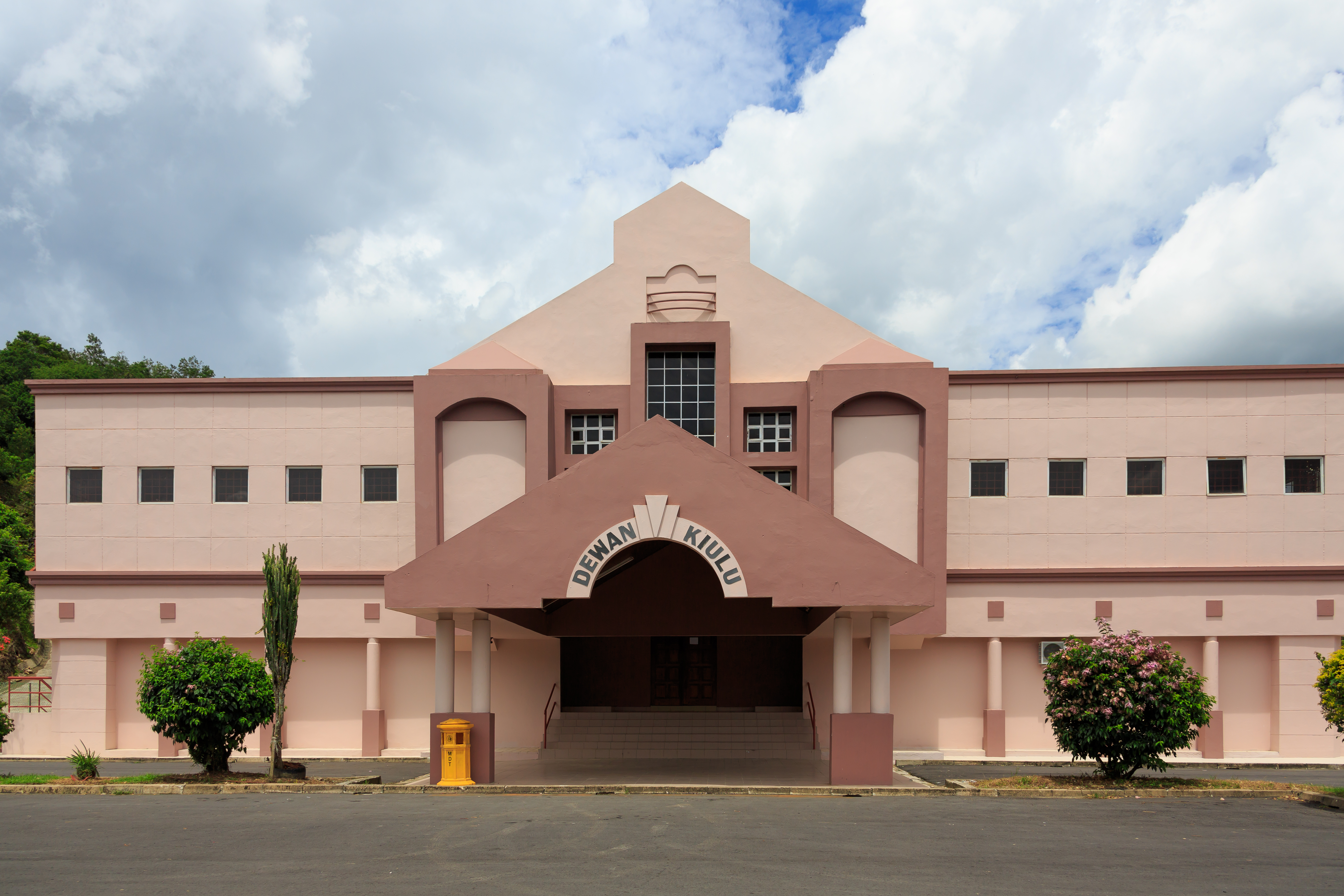
Kiulu Town

=== Sub-District ===
Tamparuli became a sub-district in 1977, followed by Kiulu in 2018. There are 2 Sub-District in Tuaran District:

- Tamparuli
- Kiulu

== Geography ==
The Tuaran district is located in the northwest of Sabah, bordered by:

- Kota Belud district to the northeast
- Ranau district to the southeast
- Penampang and Tambunan districts to the south
- Kota Kinabalu district to the west
- The South China Sea to the northwest

The topography of the Tuaran District mostly consists of lowland areas along the coastline, while the inland areas are characterized by highlands and hilly terrain within the Crocker Range. The highest point in the Tuaran District is Mount Alab, which reaches an elevation of 1,951m (6,401 feet). The longest river in this district is the Tuaran River, and the largest island is Pulau Lipan.

== Demographics ==
Historical population
| Year | Pop. | ±% |
|---|---|---|
| 1991 | 63,995 | — |
| 2000 | 81,215 | +26.9% |
| 2010 | 102,411 | +26.1% |
| 2020 | 135,665 | +32.5% |

According to the last census in 2020, the population of the district is estimated to be around 135,665, mainly Dusun and Bajau people as well a significant number of Chinese and Malay. As in other districts of Sabah, there are a significant number of illegal immigrants from the nearby southern Philippines, mainly from the Sulu Archipelago and Mindanao, many of whom are not included in the population statistics.

== Tourism ==
Tourist attractions in Tuaran include the Mengkabong and Penimbawan water villages, which are villages of stilt houses built over the seashore by the Bajau people, and the Ling San Pagoda (Traditional Chinese: 龍山塔), a nine-storey Buddhist pagoda situated just outside the town centre. The main tourist resorts in Tuaran are the Mimpian Jadi Resort and Shangri-La's Rasa Ria Resort. In addition to food and lodging, these resorts offer various other activities such as golfing and water sports.

=== Other Attraction ===
List of attraction at Tuaran District
| Num | Area | Attraction Place |
| 1 | Tuaran | • 9-storey Ling-San Pagoda Tower • Peak of Hope • Borneo Ant House • Tuaran Crocodile • Sabandar Cowboy Town Farm • Dalit Bay Golf & Country Club • Mengkabong and Penimbawan water villages • Shangri-La's Rasa Ria Resort • Linangkit Cultural Village • Lotud's Tree House • Nuluh Lapai Jungle Trails |
| 2 | Tamparuli | • Upside Down House • Tamparuli Suspension Bridge • Ruhiang Hill (Bukit Perahu) • Murug-Turug Eco Tourism (MTET) • JonGrapevines & Figs Garden • Bungalio Hill (Glass Bridge) |
| 3 | Kiulu | • Jurassic Land Kiulu • Kiulu White Water Rafting Centre • Zip Borneo (The Adventure Centre) • Borneo Quad Biking • Kiulu Farmstay • Kondis Point |
| 4 | Tenghilan | • Sambah River Cruise |

== Gallery ==
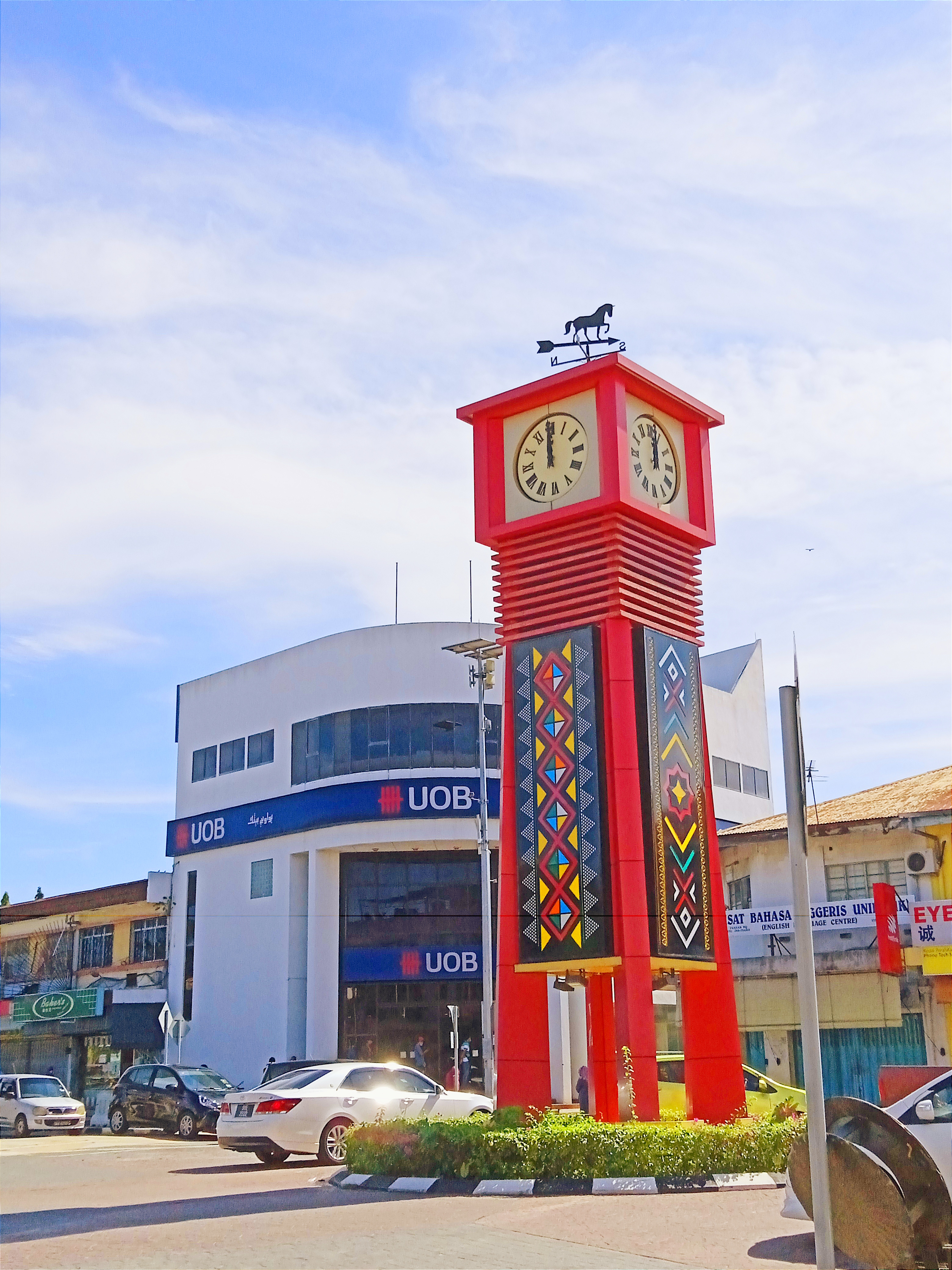
Tuaran Clock Tower.

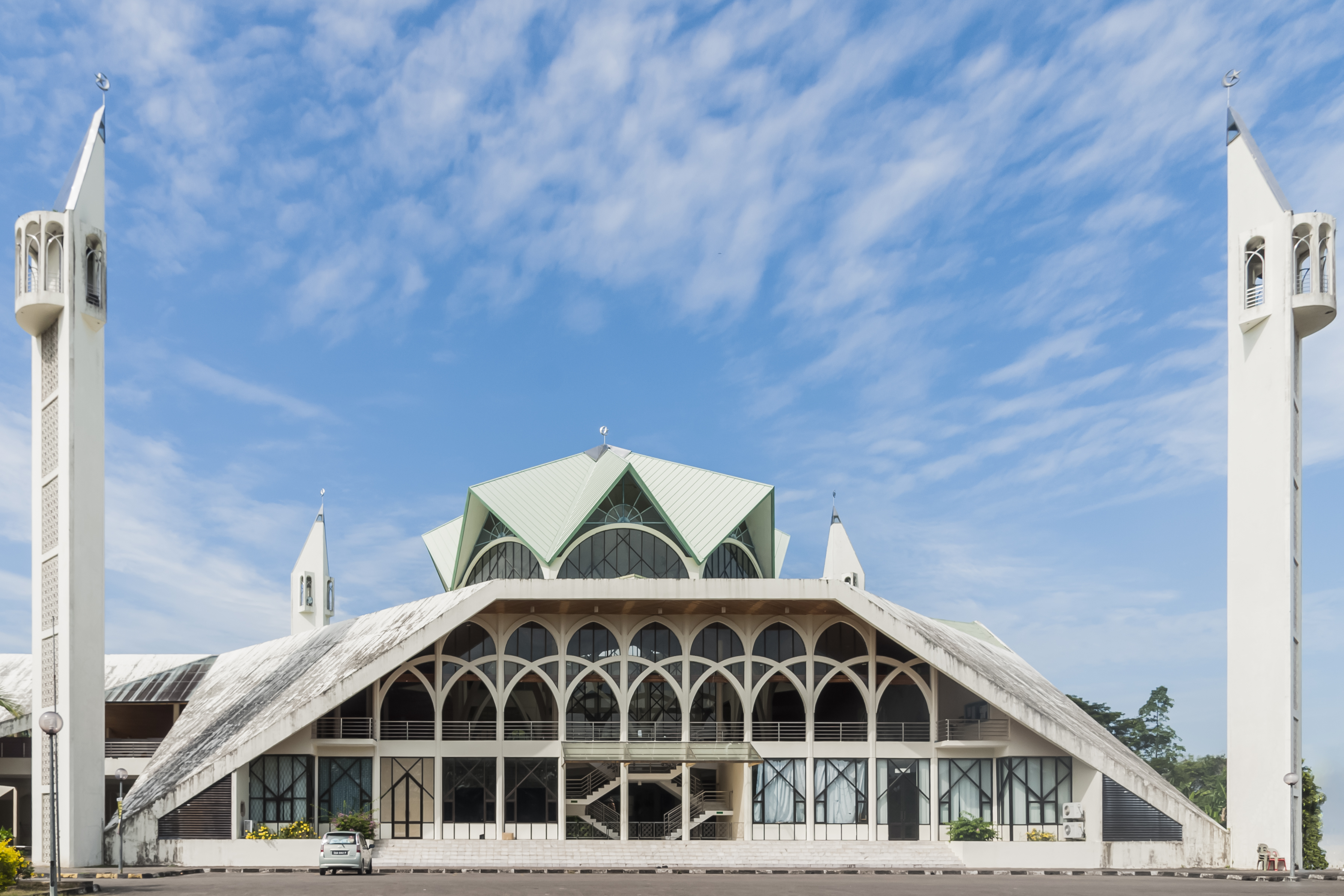
An-Nur Mosque.

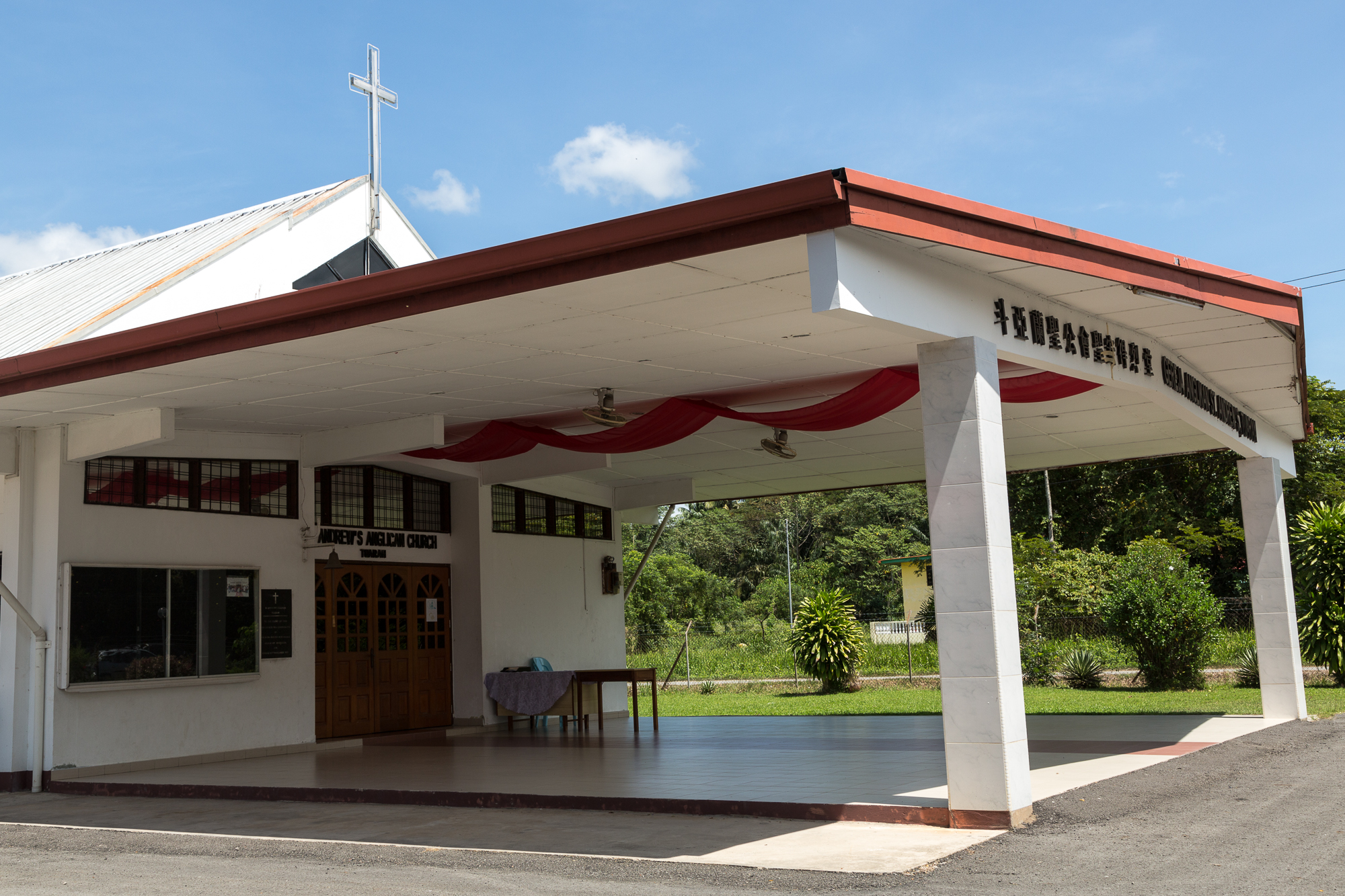
St. Andrew Anglican Church.

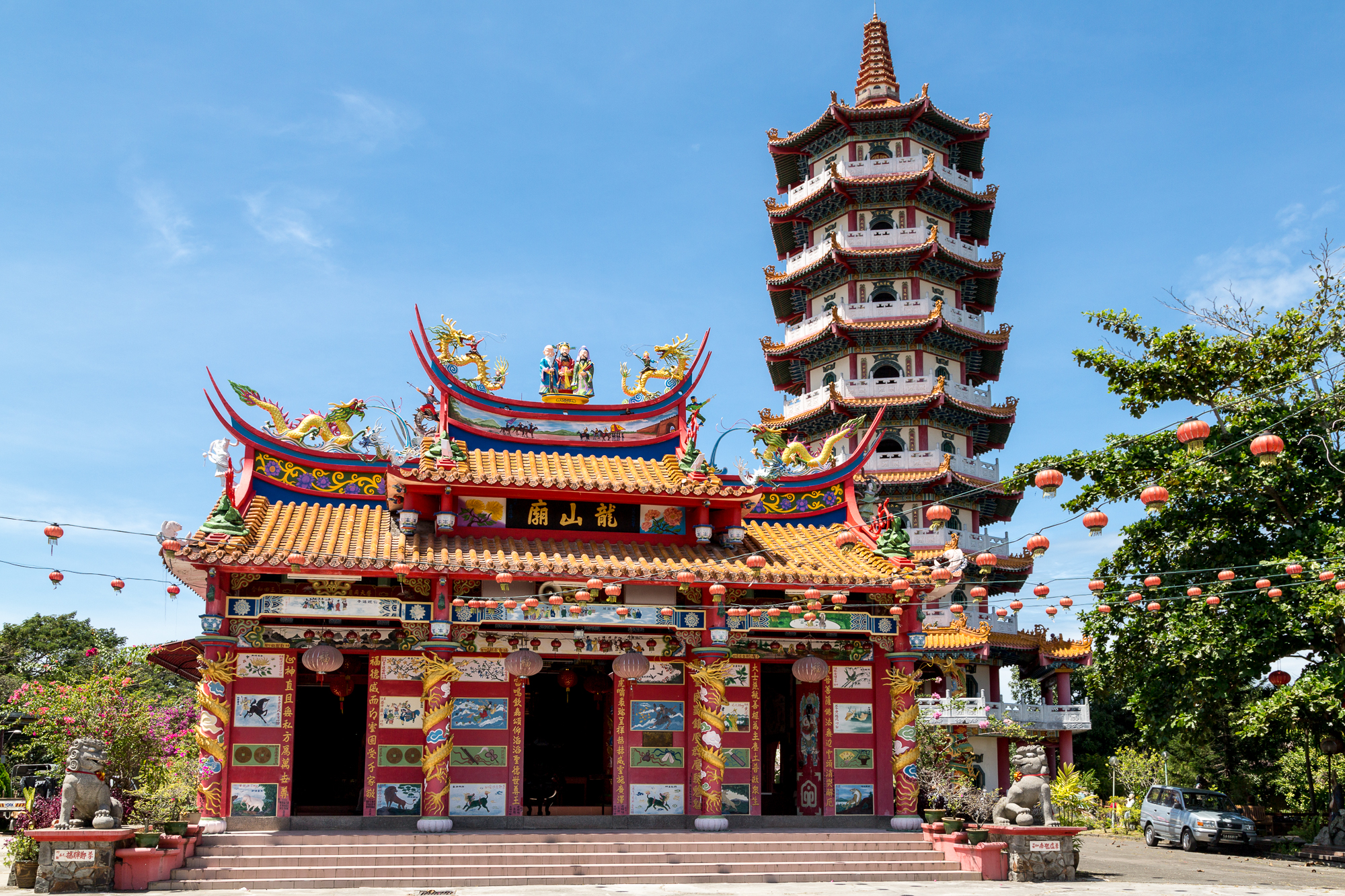
Ling San Pagoda.

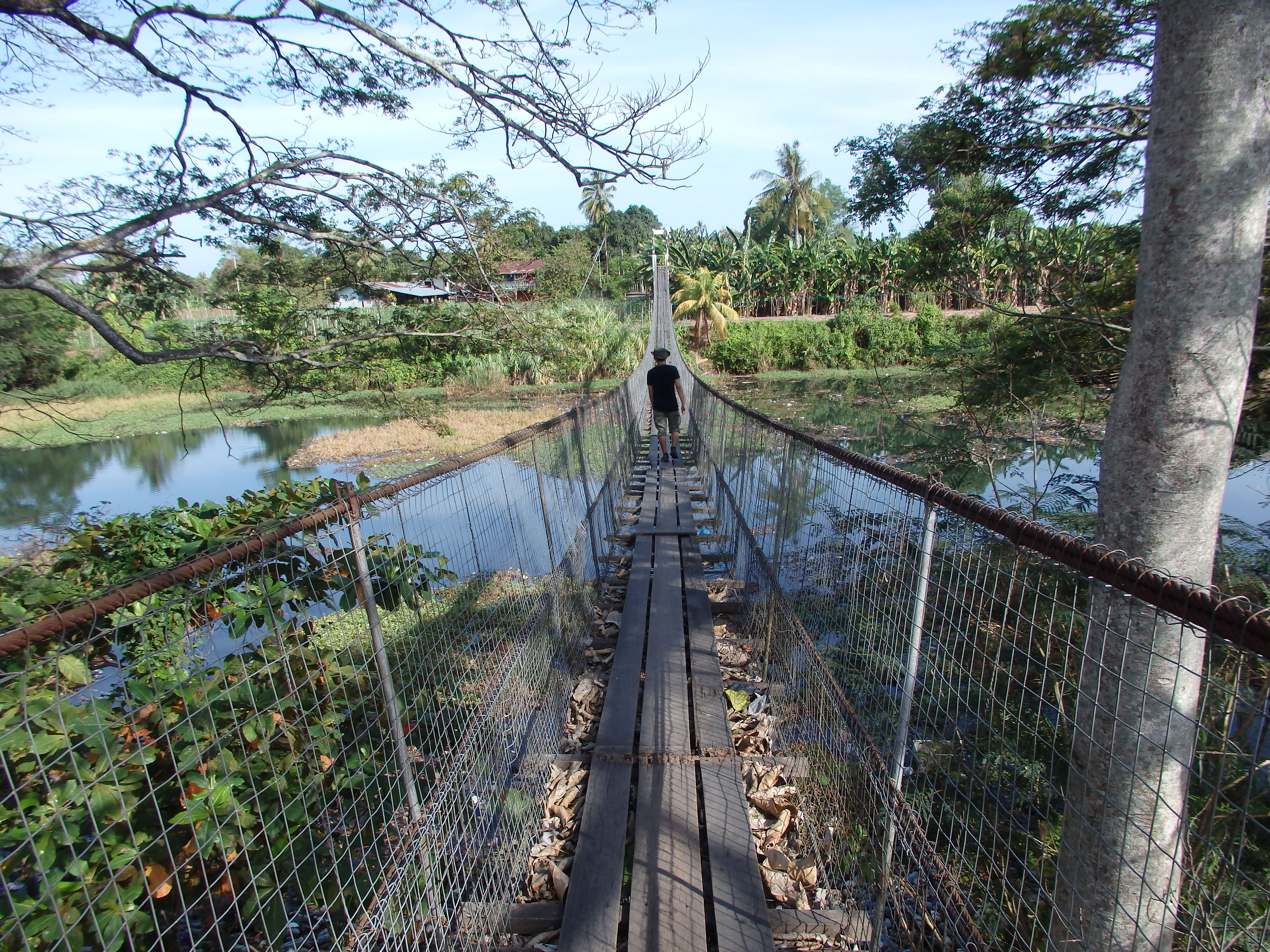
Tuaran canopy walk.

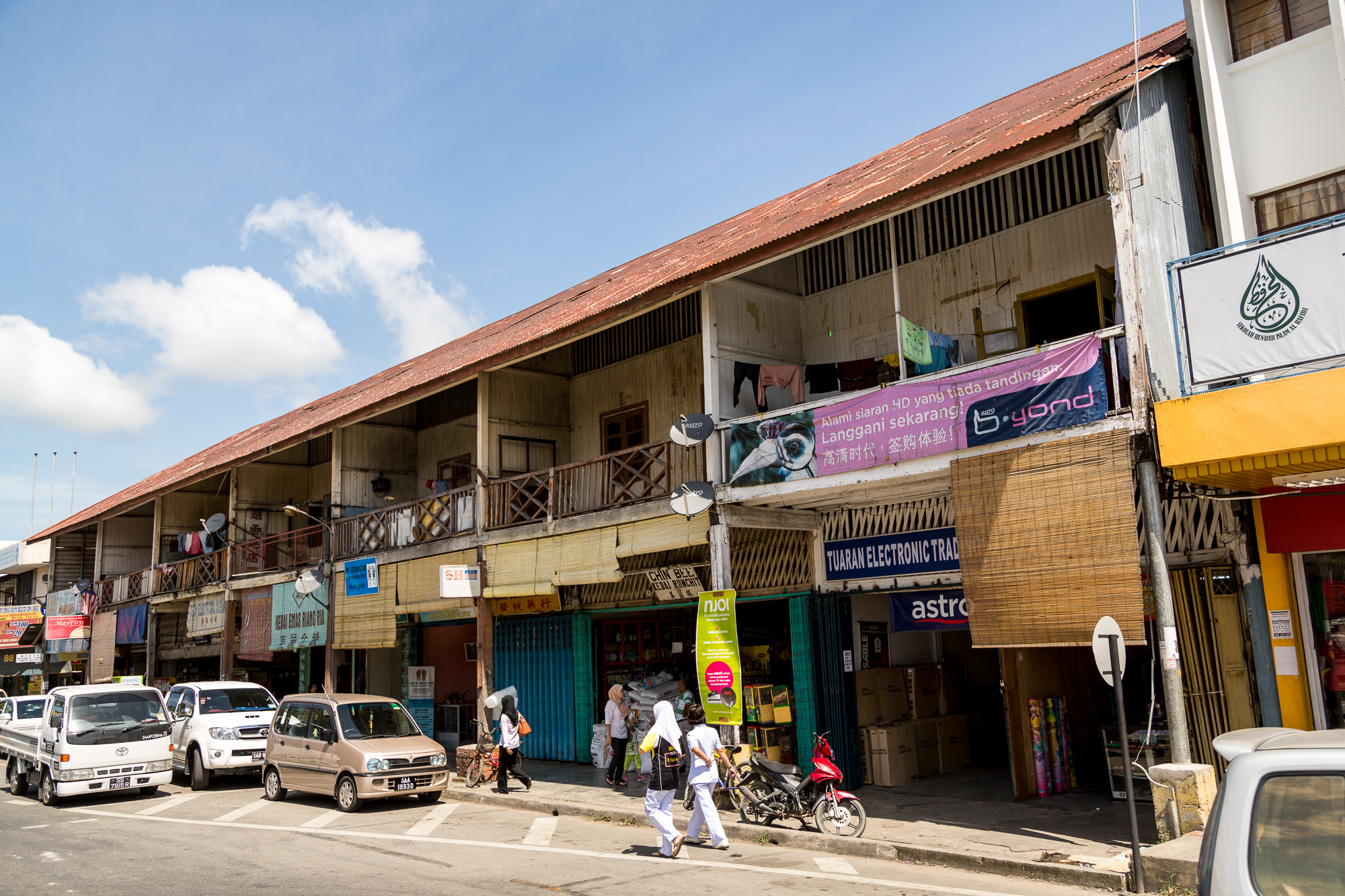
Tuaran shoplots.

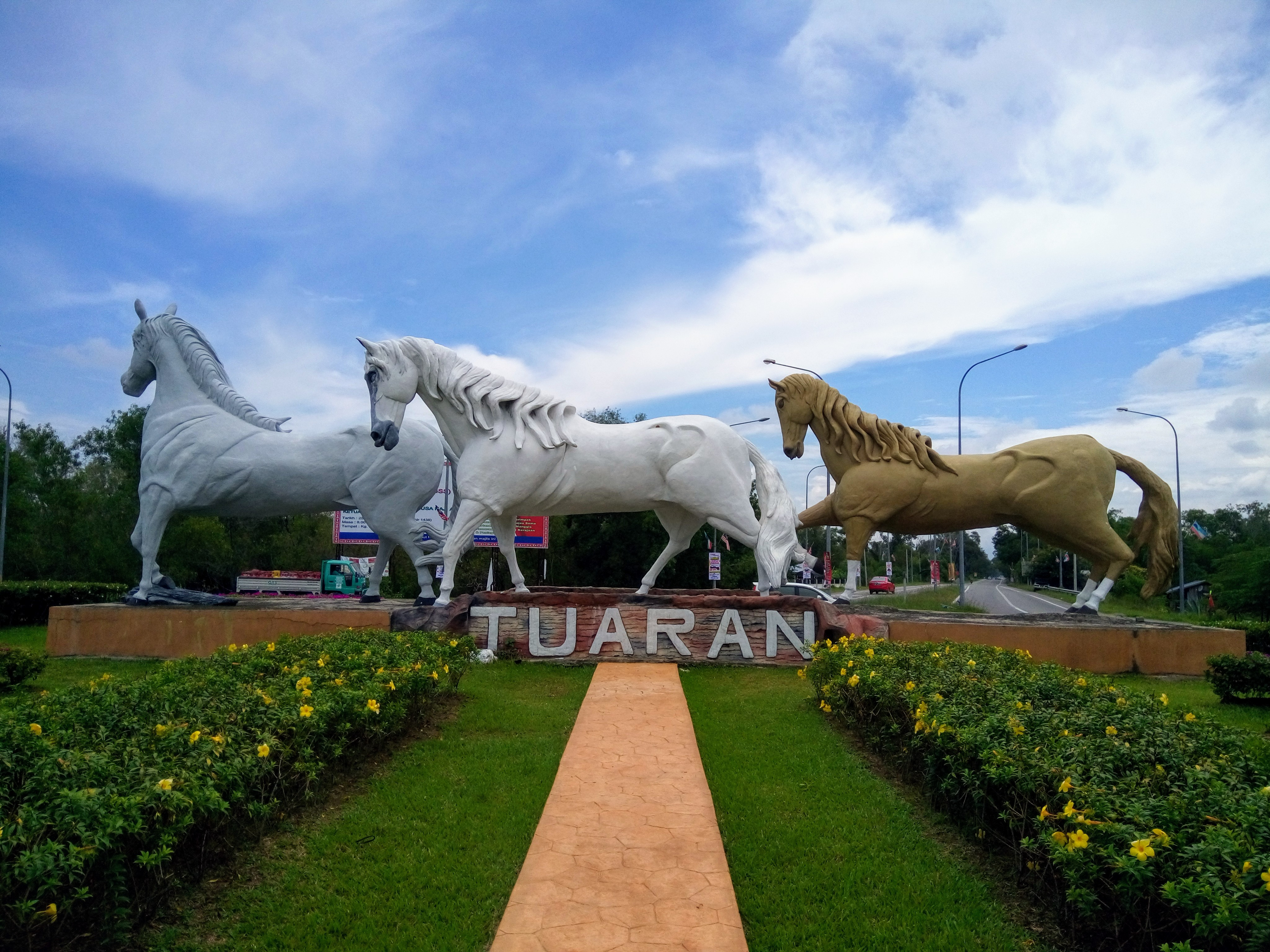
Tuaran roundabout.

== See also ==
- Districts of Malaysia
