= Nira (ingredient) =

Nira (Jawi derived from Sanskrit: नीर, romanized: nīra "water") or lahang (Jawi: لاهڠ) is a sweet liquid obtained from the stems of plants such as sugarcane, sugar beet, sorghum, maple, or the sap of the flower stalks (spathe) of the palm family such as arenga palm, coconut, date palm, nipa palm, sago palm, tal palm and others.

Nira contains about 10-15% sugar. This liquid can be consumed directly, fermented into palm wine or further processed into syrup, sugar and other products.

== Extraction ==
Nira is obtained through a method called "tapping". The plant from which the sap is to be harvested is bent slightly, with its spathe wrapped in young coconut leaves. This process continues for about a week to prevent the stalk from breaking. The bent spathe is stripped of its sheath and sliced little by little using a tapping knife, allowing the sap to drip into a bamboo container, usually about a foot long or holding around 2 liters.

The volume of nira collected can depend on weather conditions. For example, in the Philippines, nipa farmers can predict the arrival of typhoons (common in the region) a few days in advance when the daily yield of sap decreases or even stops suddenly.

Sap harvesters typically add substances to the collected nira to prevent natural fermentation, either by using sodium benzoate (0.05–0.2%) or lime (0.7–1.2%), until the pH of the sap becomes relatively high, above 7. Fermented sap with a pH below 5.5 or sugar content lower than 8% cannot be used to make palm sugar.

== Composition ==
The main sugar found in nira is sucrose. Nira also contains small amounts of glucose and fructose when freshly tapped. Sap from flowers is actually sterile, but once tapped, it is often contaminated by microorganisms that can hydrolyze sucrose into glucose and fructose. The hydrolysis process reduces the yield of palm sugar, and in some cases, palm sugar may not form at all, remaining a thick liquid.
