= Gabriel Ferrand =

French orientalist

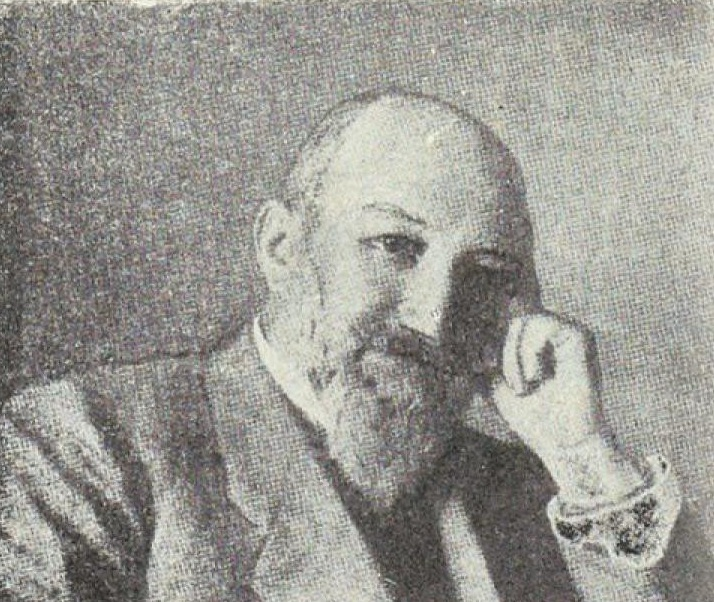
Gabriel Ferrand

Gabriel Ferrand (22 January 1864 – 31 January 1935) was a French orientalist, writer and linguistic expert who worked in Madagascar.

== Biography ==
Letter by the brother of Ferrand to Snouck Hurgronje (1935)

Gabriel Ferrand was born in Marseille. He graduated from the School of Oriental Languages. Also, he was the author of a Malagasy Essay and a Dictionary of the Language of Madagascar. He was a member of the Society of Linguistics of Paris and the Asian Society, and one of the editors of the Asian Journal. He died in Paris, aged 71.

== Works related to Ibadism ==
- Ferrand, Gabriel: (1924) L'élément persan dans les textes nautiques arabes des XVe et XVIe siècles. Offprint from: Journal Asiatique (Paris), April-June 1924, pp. 193-257.
- Ferrand, Gabriel: (1928) Les Sultans de Kilwa. Offprint from Publications de l'Institut des Hautes-Études Marocaines, vol. 17, 239-260. Mémorial Henri Basset. Nouvelles Études Nord-Africaines et Orientales. Paris: Librarie Orientaliste Paul Geuthner, 1928.

== Other works ==
- Ferrand, Gabriel: Les Musulmans à Madagascar et aux îles Comores, 3 parties, Paris : E. Leroux, 1891-1902.
- Ferrand, Gabriel: populaires malgaches (recueillis, traduits et annotés par Gabriel Ferrand), Paris : E. Leroux, 1893.
- Ferrand, Gabriel: de grammaire malgache, Paris : E. Leroux, 1903.
- Ferrand, Gabriel: Dictionnaire de la langue de Madagascar d'après l'édition de 1658 et l'histoire de la grande Isle Madagascar de 1661, Paris : E. Leroux, 1905.
- Ferrand, Gabriel: Essai de phonétique comparée du malais et des dialectes malgaches (thèse pour le doctorat d'université, présentée à la Faculté des lettres de l'Université de Paris), Paris : Librairie orientaliste Paul Geuthner, 1909.
- Ferrand, Gabriel: Relations de voyages et textes géographiques arabes, persans et turks relatifs à l'Extrême-Orient du VIII^{e} au XVIII^{e} siècles (traduits, revus et annotés par Gabriel Ferrand), 2 volumes, Paris : E. Leroux, 1913-1914.
- Ferrand, Gabriel: Le Pilote des mers de l'Inde, de la Chine et de l'Indonésie (traduit de l'arabe par Gabriel Ferrand), 2 volumes, Paris : Librairie orientaliste Paul Geuthner, 1921-1923.
- Ferrand, Gabriel: Voyage du marchand arabe Sulaymân en Inde et en Chine, rédigé en 851 (traduit de l'arabe par Gabriel Ferrand), Paris : Bossard, 1922.
