= Sang nyuk mee =

Pork noodle dish from Sabah, Malaysia

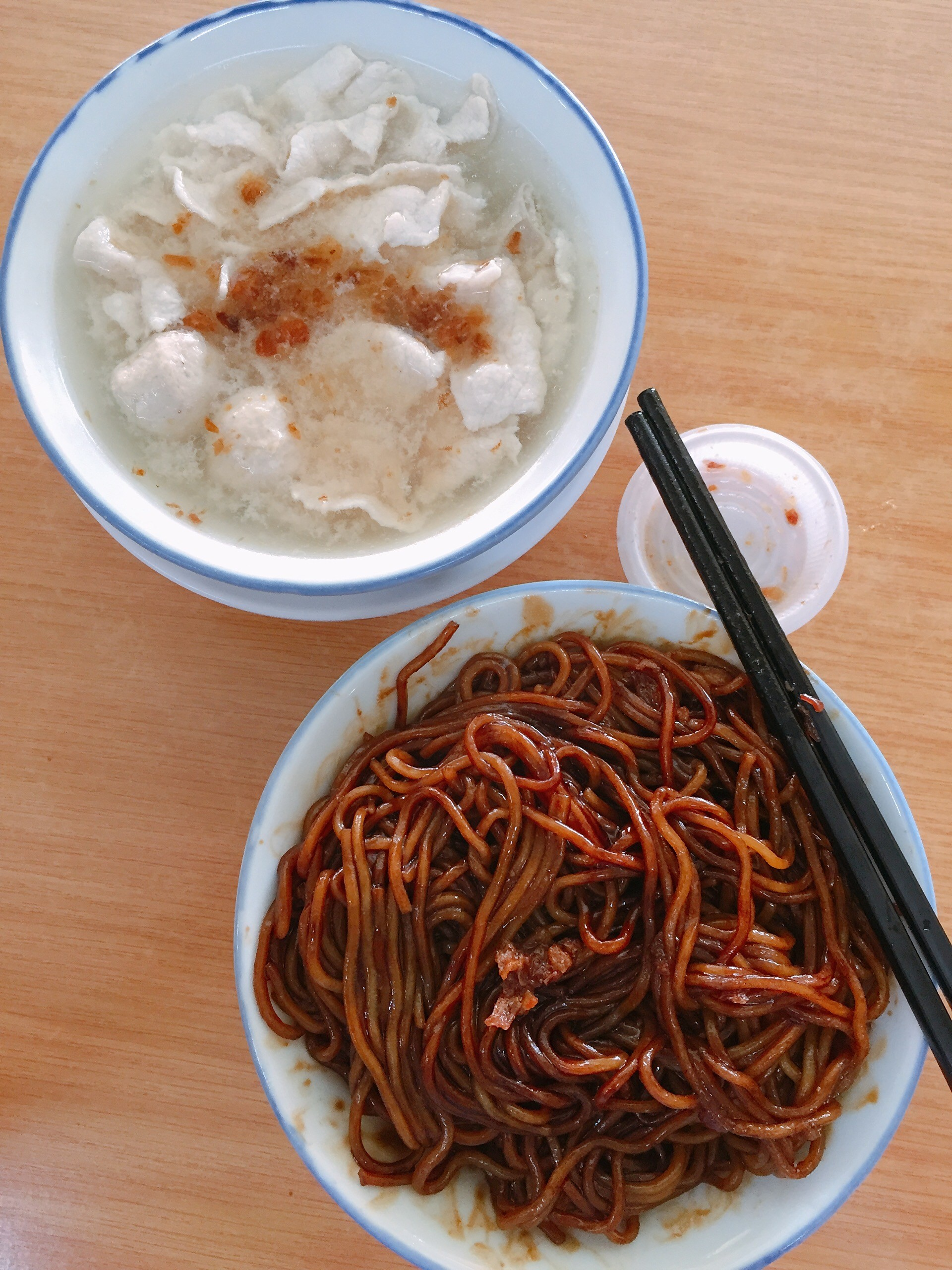
- Dry variety of sang nyuk mee
- Alternative names: mi sang nyuk; sang nyuk meen; sang nyuk mian; sang nyuk mien; sang nyuk noodle; Sabah pork noodle
- Type: Noodle dish
- Course: Main course
- Place of origin: Tawau, Malaysia
- Region or state: Sabah
- Associated cuisine: Sabahan cuisine
- Created by: Two unnamed Malaysian Chinese brothers
- Main ingredients: Egg noodles or rice vermicelli
- Ingredients generally used: Pork lard, dark soy sauce, sweet soy sauce, and garlic oil (kon lau dry version); Pork bone broth (soup version)
- Variations: kon lau version, soup version

Sang nyuk mee, or mee Sang nyuk (Malay: Mi Sang nyuk; Chinese: 生肉面; pinyin: Shēngròu miàn), is a Sabahan dish consisting of yellow egg noodles or rice vermicelli that comes either in two forms of kon lau or with soup paired with pork originating from the southeastern part of Tawau town in Sabah, Malaysia. The noodle is among Sabah's noodle heritage, apart from the Beaufort mee, Kota Belud soup mee, Tamparuli mee, Tenom mee, Tawau tofu mee, and Tuaran mee.

== Origin and background ==
The noodle was first invented in 1979 by two local Chinese brothers in Sabah's eastern coast town of Tawau, derived from Teochew pork and cabbage soup, and it is often paired with white rice. The name "sang nyuk", which is a Hakka dialect, carries the meaning of "raw meat". It was later spread in other parts of Sabah, especially the state's capital of Kota Kinabalu, with "Kedai Kopi Kim Hing Lee" (Kim Hing Lee Coffee Shop) at Sinsuran Complex among the first to serve the noodle in the city. With the increasing popularity throughout Malaysia, other sang nyuk mee restaurant branch also has a presence in West Malaysia.

== Preparation ==
The preparation of sang nyuk mee consists of three primary components: rendering pork lard, simmering pork bone broth, and preparing marinated sliced pork. The noodles are served either dry or in soup, typically presented in two separate bowls.

== See also ==
- List of noodle dishes
- Mee tauhu, another noodle dish from Tawau; consisting of yellow egg noodles with tofu
