= Tuaran mee =

Egg noodle dish from Sabah, Malaysia

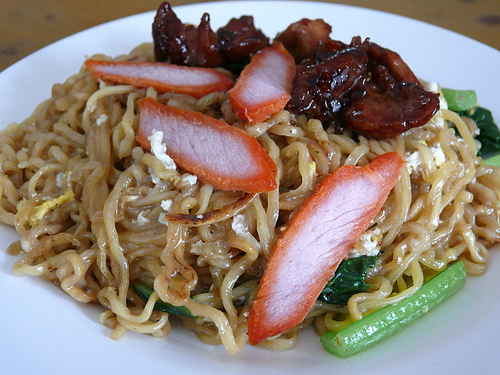
- Sabah Tuaran mee with slices of sweet char siu (barbecued pork), choy sum (mustard greens), and eggs part
- Alternative names: diu ah lan men; mi tuaran; tuaran noodle; tuaran fried noodle
- Type: Noodle dish
- Course: Main course
- Place of origin: Tuaran, Malaysia
- Region or state: Sabah
- Associated cuisine: Sabahan cuisine
- Created by: Madam Si
- Main ingredients: Egg noodles, choy sum, and char siu slices

Tuaran mee, or mee Tuaran (Malay: Mi Tuaran; Chinese: 斗亚兰面; pinyin: Dòu yà lán miàn), is a Sabahan dish consisting of springy handmade egg noodles combined with choy sum and slices of char siu, which are cooked through intense frying in a wok until they attain a crispy texture originating from the northwestern part of Tuaran town in Sabah, Malaysia. The noodle is among Sabah's noodle heritage, which is considered the region's main noodle signature dish and usually served with a local Hakka spring roll known as "chun kien".

== Origin and background ==
In Sabah, where the local Chinese populace is dominated by the Hakkas, each Chinese noodle is named after its districts, such as the Beaufort mee, Kota Belud soup mee, Tamparuli mee, and Tenom mee, aside from the Tuaran mee. The noodle was created in 1952 by Madam Si and subsequently proliferated among Sabah's Hakka communities in Tuaran town during the late 1970s, when it began to replace the traditional knife-cut noodles. Until the mid-1980s, fried noodles in Sabah were earlier referred to as "chao men" in the local Hakka dialect. When the fried noodles became popularised, other local Hakka around Sabah began to refer to it as simply of "tao-ah-lan men" (Tuaran mee).

== Preparation ==
The preparation of Tuaran mee consists of three primary steps to attain its distinctive texture: first, the noodles are fried until crispy; second, they are briefly boiled; and finally, they are stir-fried with eggs, vegetables, and meats. The egg's coating yields its characteristic appearance, which is subtly golden and lustrous. The noodle is offered in numerous kopitiams and restaurants throughout Sabah, with some establishments also allowing the option to combine it with lihing, a local Kadazan-Dusun rice wine.

== Gallery ==
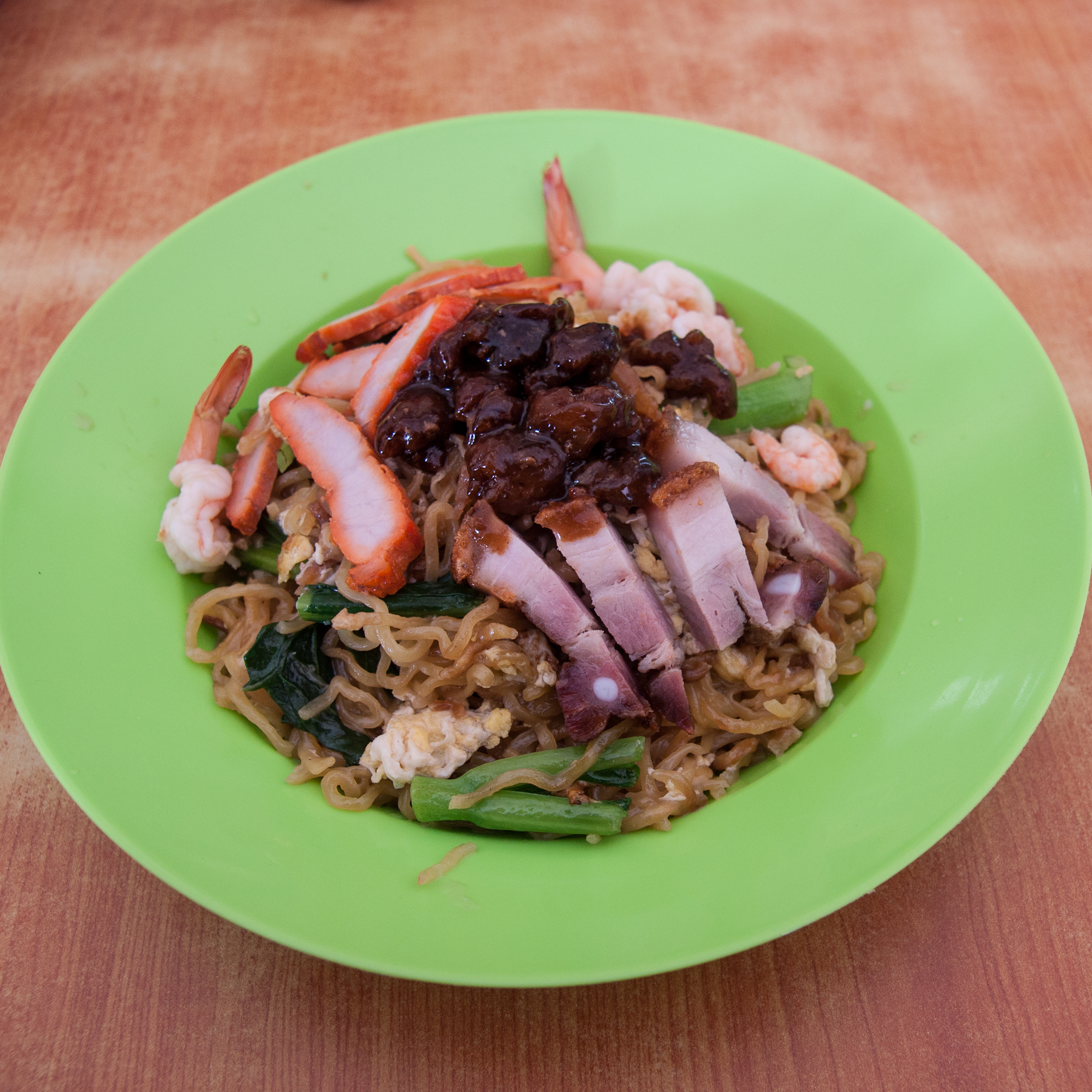
Tuaran mee served in a plate

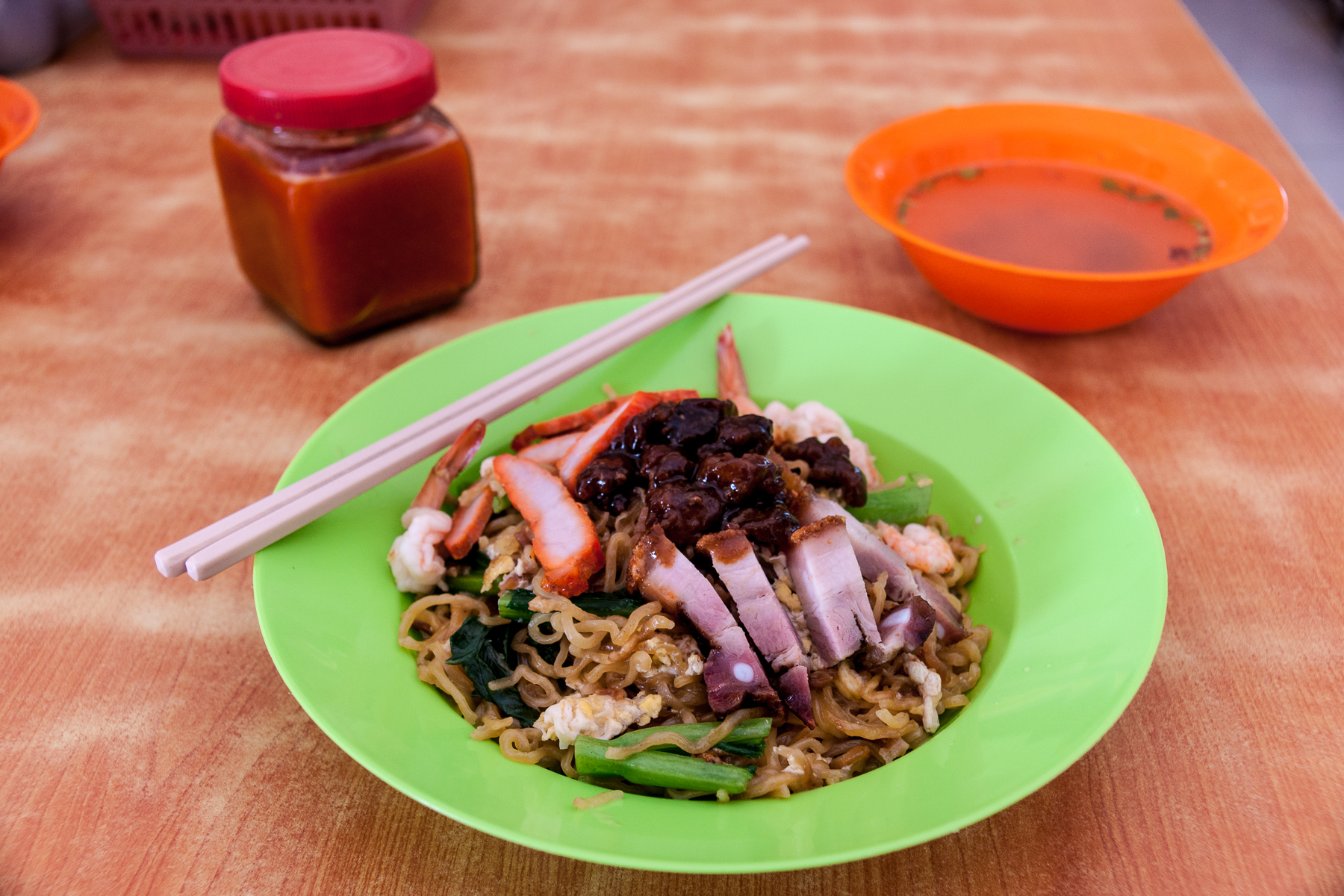
Tuaran mee with dipping sauce and soup

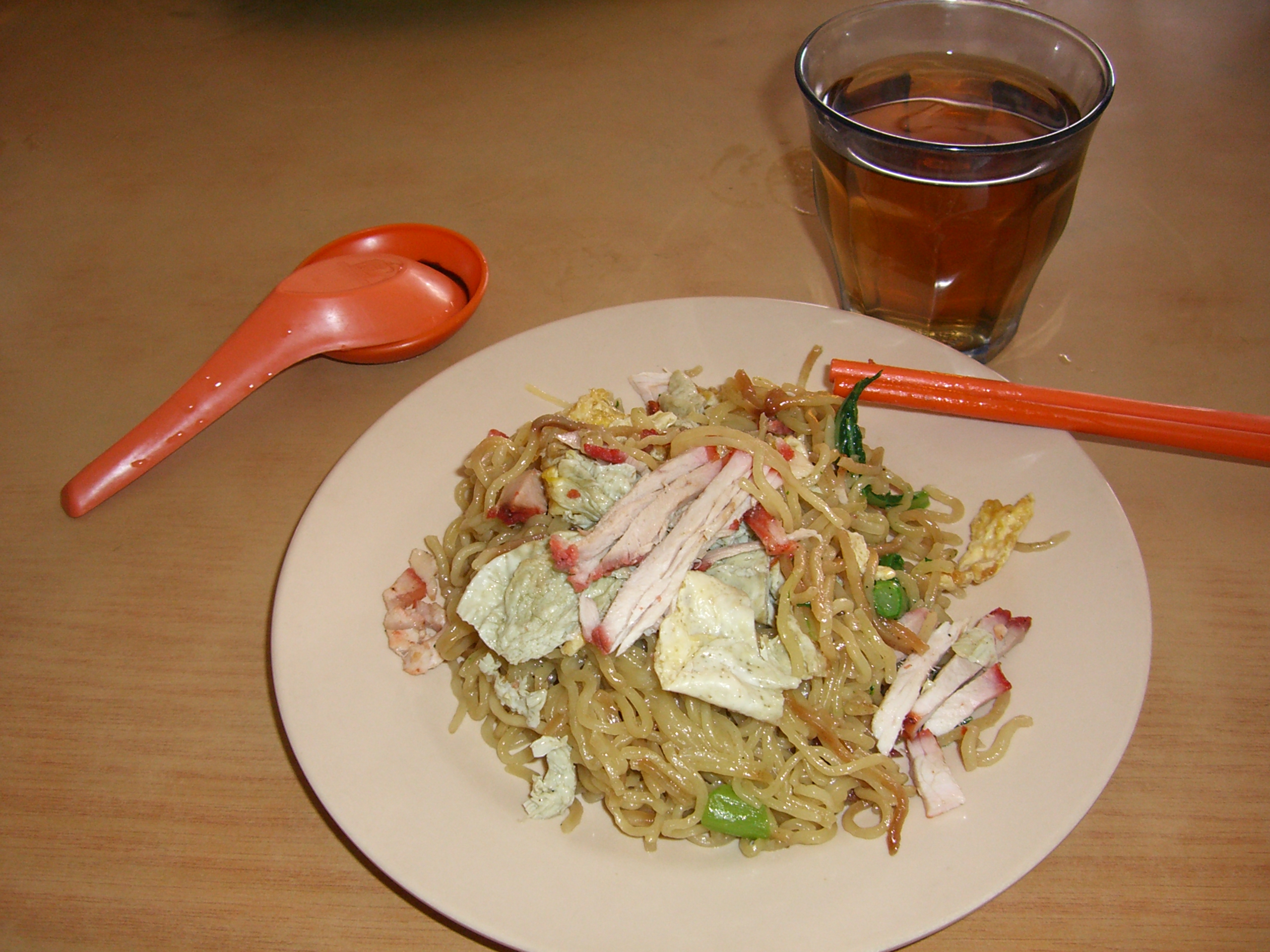
Tuaran mee served with tea

== See also ==
- List of noodle dishes
