= Sabahan cuisine =

Regional cuisine of Malaysia

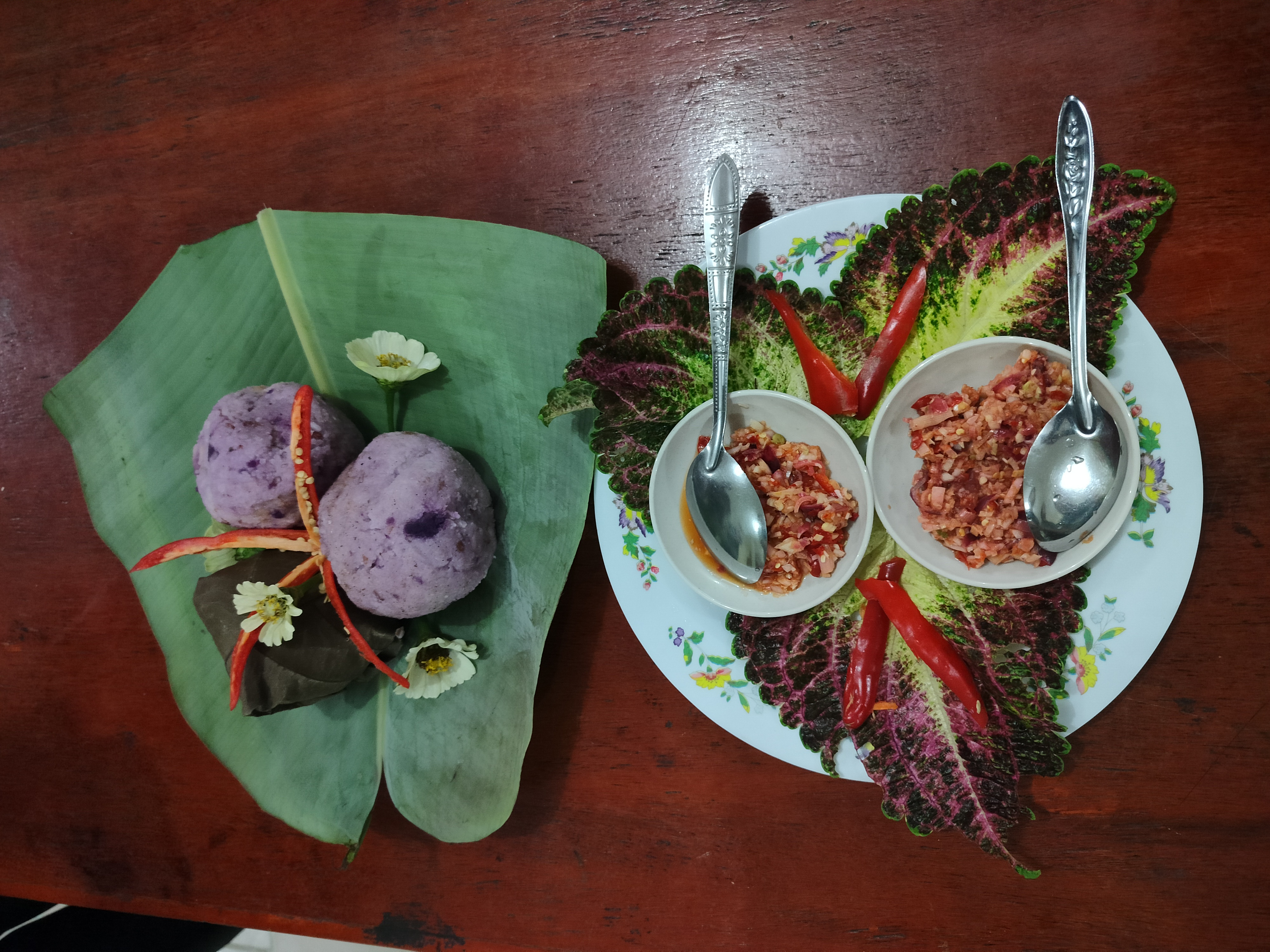
Linopot (left) with tuhau sambal (right), the main dish among the indigenous Kadazan-Dusun, Murut, and Rungus community.

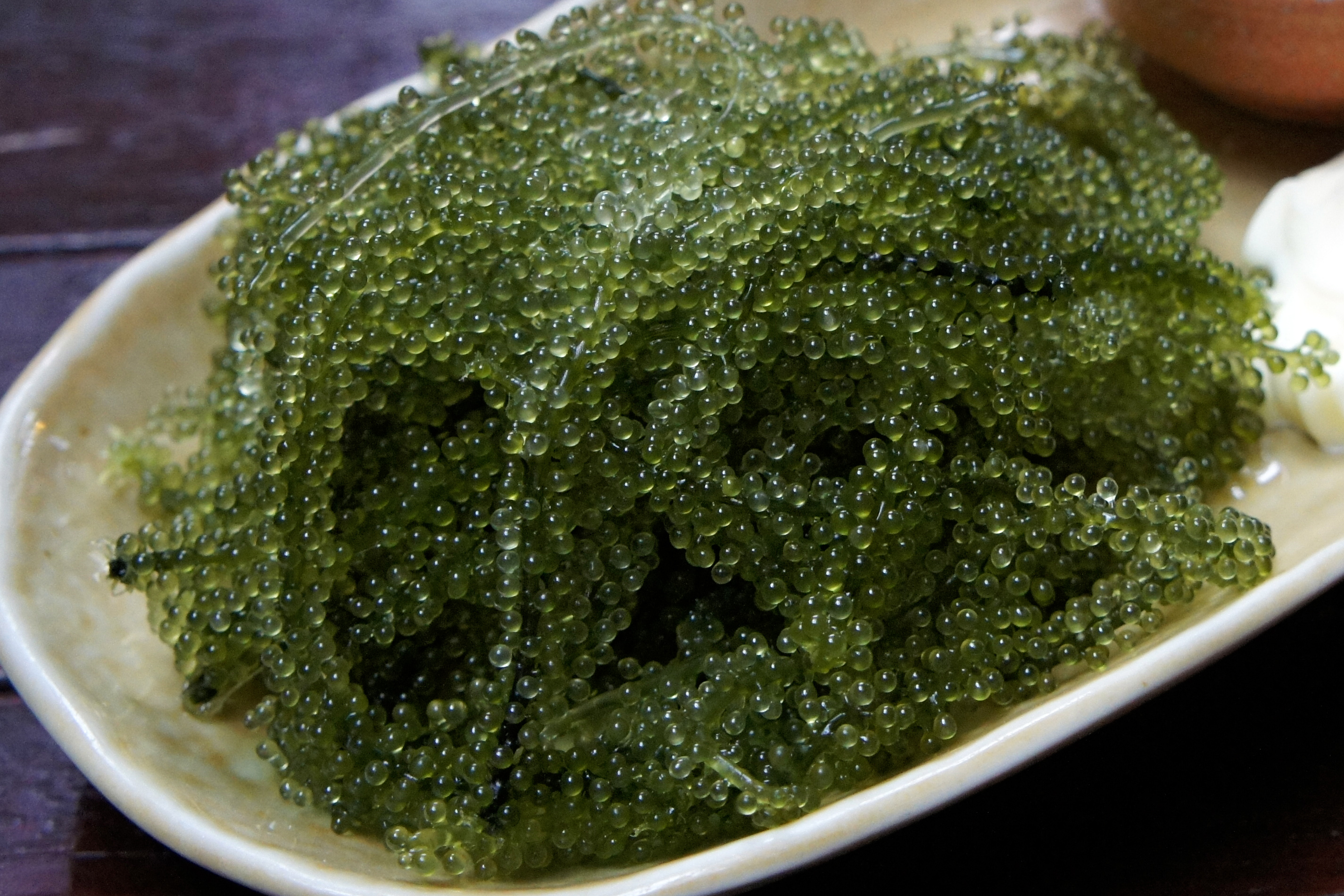
Sea grapes, known as latok by the Bajau community.

Sabahan cuisine is a regional cuisine of Malaysia. As in the rest of Malaysian cuisine, Sabah food is based on staples such as rice with a great variety of other ingredients and different methods of food preparations due to the influence of the state's varied geography and indigenous cultures that were quite distinct from the regional cuisines of the Peninsular Malaysia. Sabah along with its neighbour of Sarawak is famous for their multi-ethnic population.

== Dishes ==
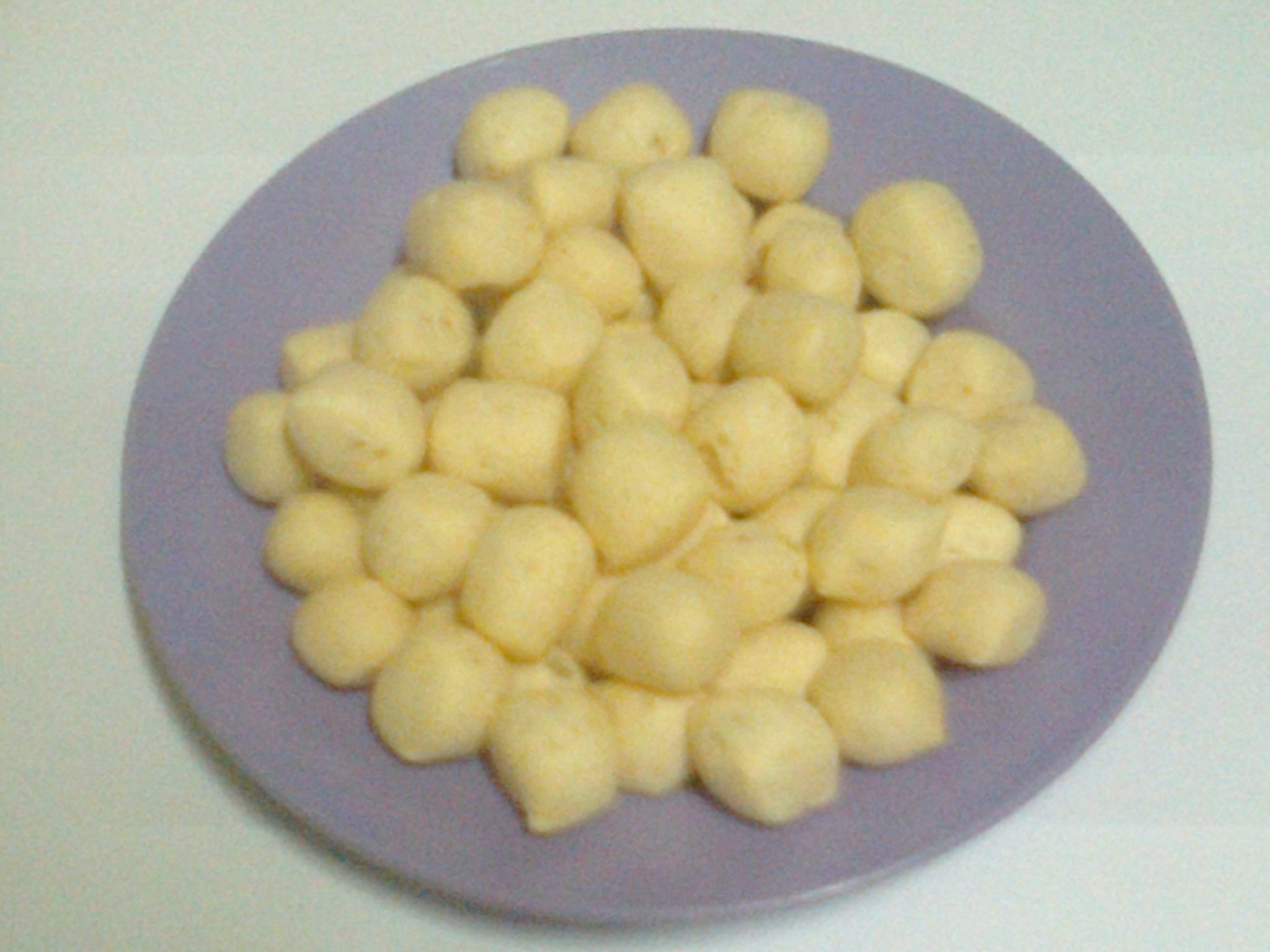
Amplang.

Among the foods and beverages particular to Sabah are:

- Amplang is a type of cracker made from Spanish mackerel, tapioca starch and other seasonings, and then deep fried.

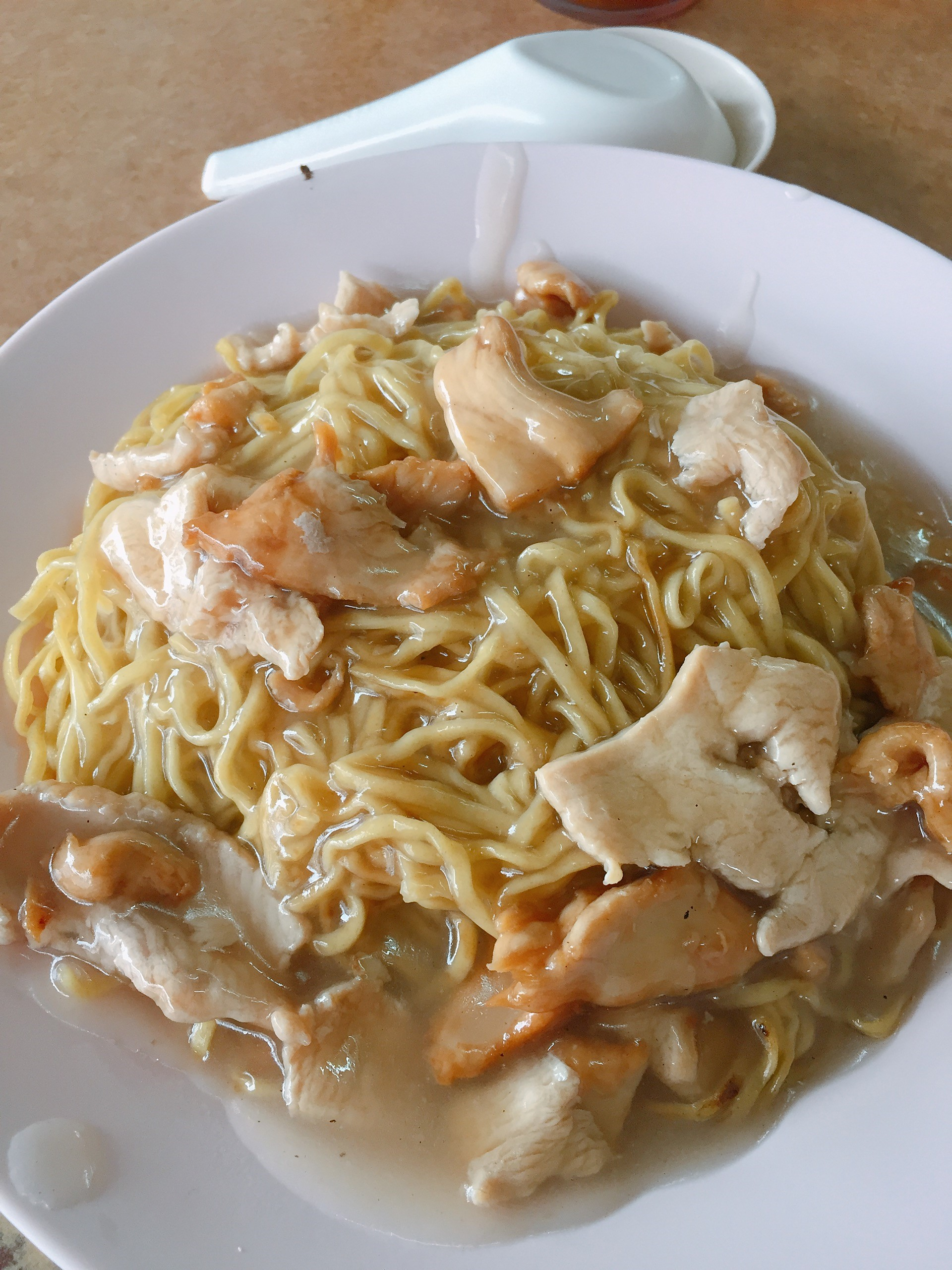
Beaufort mee

- Beaufort mee (Chinese: 保佛炒面; pinyin: Bǎo fú chǎomiàn) is a speciality of Beaufort town. Handmade noodles are smoked, then wok-tossed with meat (usually slices of char siu and marinated pork) or seafood and plenty of choy sum, and finished off with a thick viscous gravy.
- Bosou, also called noonsom or tonsom, is the Kadazan-Dusun term for a traditional recipe of tangy fermented meat. Smoked and pulverised buah keluak (nuts from the Kepayang tree (Pangium edule) which grows in Malaysia's mangrove swamplands), or pangi is a key ingredient and acts as a preservative. Combined with rice, salt and fresh meat or fish, the mixture is then placed into a sealed jar or container for fermentation. Contemporary variants for bosou add bananas and pineapples to the mixture. Pinongian is a variant where rice is omitted to produce a final product which is much less tangy in taste; however, unlike bosou, "pinongian" must be cooked before serving.
- Century egg dumpling (Chinese: 皮蛋饺; pinyin: pí dàn jǐao) is a speciality of Sandakan town. The dumpling is added with a cutlet of century egg & may be served along with noodles.
- Fried pork (Chinese: 炸肉; pinyin: zhà ròu) is a speciality of Sandakan town. The specially marinated pork is fried & later cut to slices, usually served along with soup & wide vermicelli, also commonly served with dried noodle.

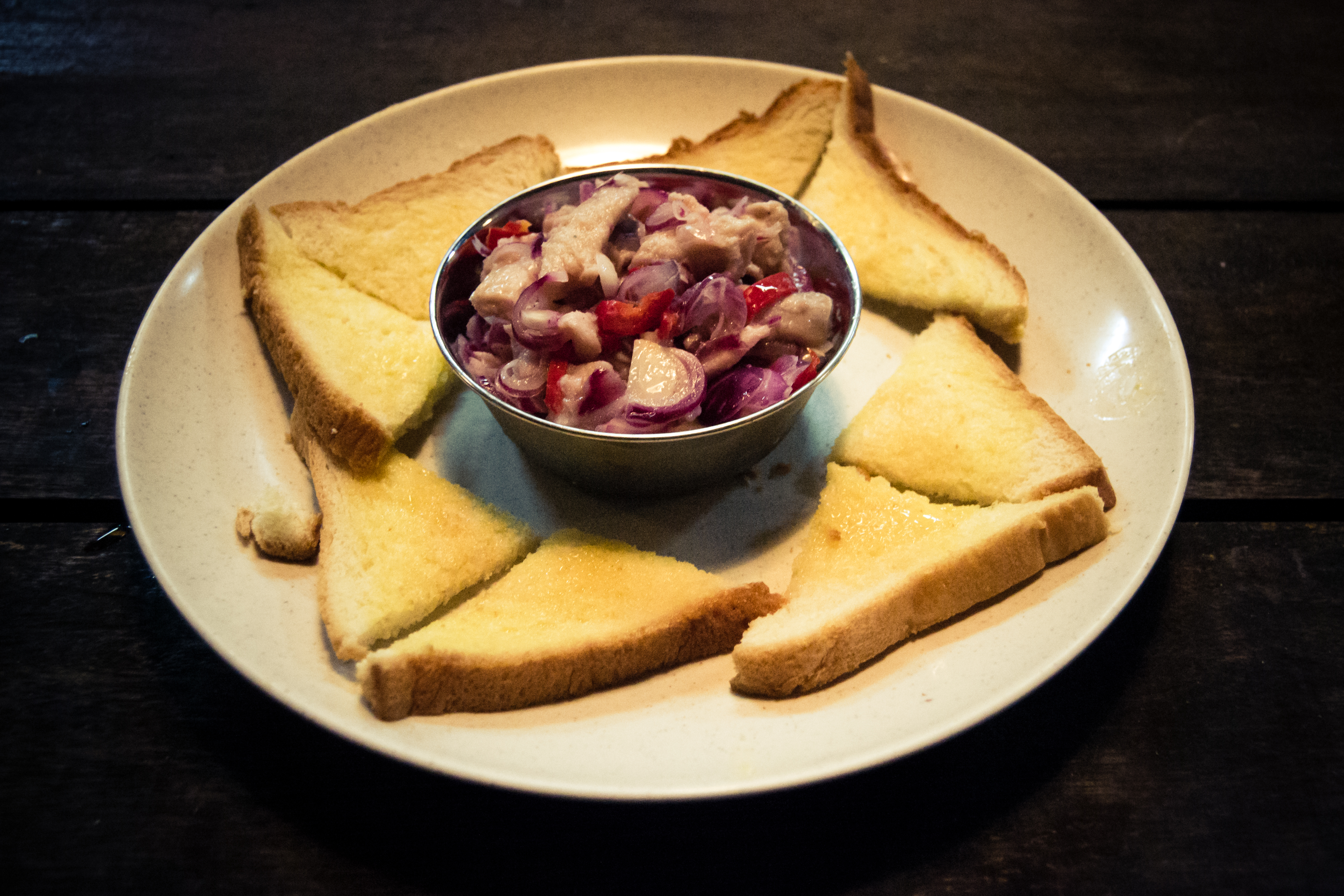
Swordfish hinava served with sandwich bread.

- Hinava is a traditional Kadazan-Dusun dish of raw fish cured in lime juice. Typically, firm fleshed white fish like mackerel (hinava sada tongii) is marinated with lime juice, sliced shallots, chopped chilli, julienned ginger and grated dried seed of the bambangan fruit. Optional additions may include sliced bitter gourd. Hinava may also be made with prawns (hinava gipan).
- Kelupis is a type of food wrapped in leaf.
- Ketupat is a type of food wrapped in leaf.
- Linopot (also known as linongot or sinamazan) is a type of hill rice or sticky rice wrapped in leaf (usually irik or tarap leaves) with a combination of root vegetables like sweet potatoes and yam. In the past, the dish was commonly made into practical and easy-to-carry food supplies when indigenous Kadazan-Dusun, Murut, and Rungus farmers worked in the fields, hunted, or travelled deep into the forest.
- Mee Tauhu is a noodle dish from Tawau, known for its savory taucu (fermented soybean paste) gravy and various types of tofu. The dish typically features stir-fried yellow noodles served with a rich, flavorful gravy made from taucu, garlic and seasonings, accompanied by tofu varieties like fried tofu puffs or white tofu.
- Nasi kombos is a rice dish from the Lotud community. Glutinous rice is first cooked with young coconut water, and then mixed with the grated tender flesh of a young coconut. The rice is traditionally served in a hollowed out coconut shell.
- Noonsom bambangan is a pickle made from half ripe bambangan fruit mixed with grated dried bambangan seed and salt, sealed in a tightly covered jar and left to ferment for weeks.

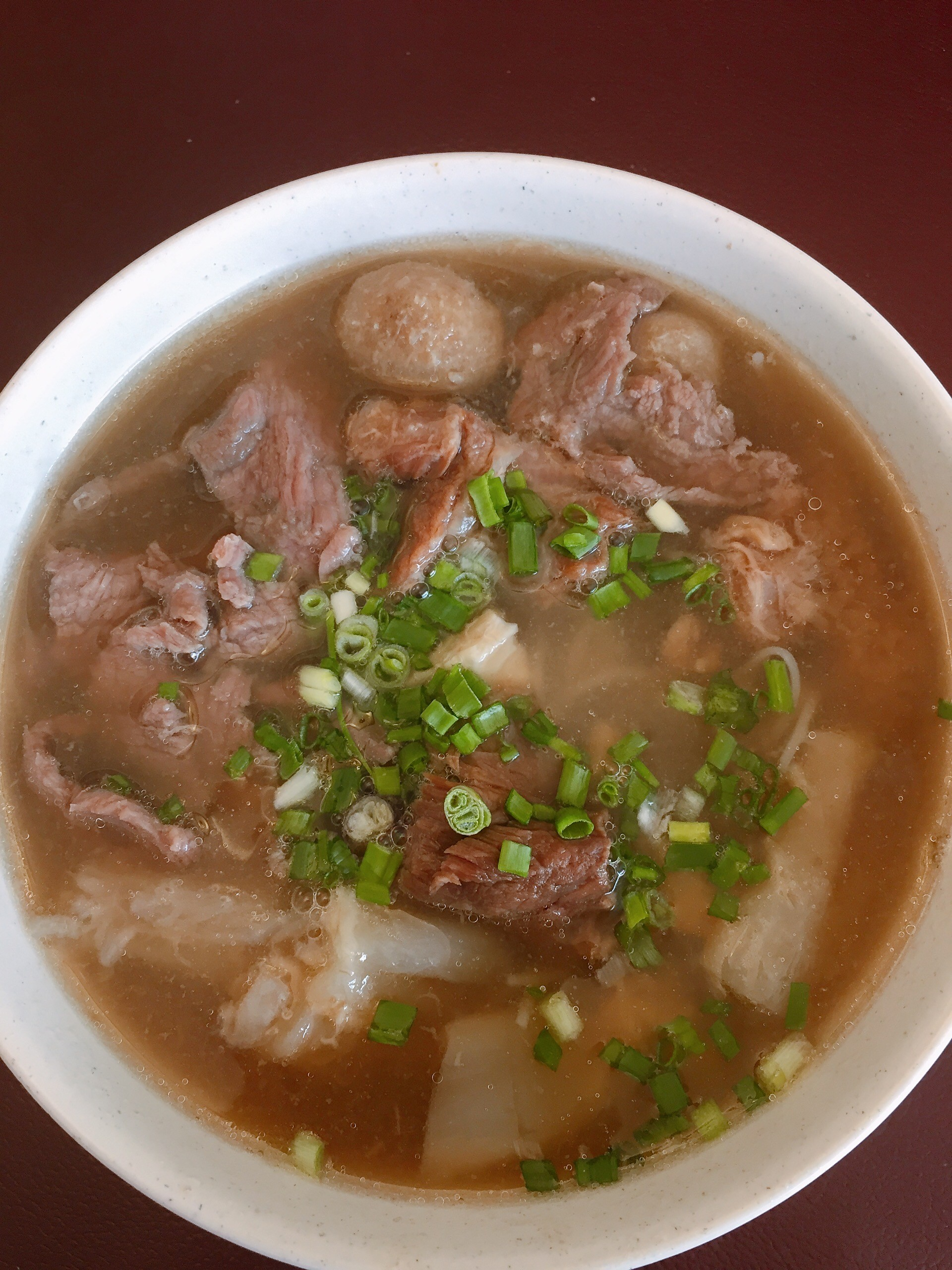
Ngiu chap (mixed beef noodle soup)

- Ngiu chap (Chinese: 牛什; pinyin: Niú shén) is a Chinese-influenced dish of beef or buffalo broth served with noodles, usually immersed in the soup with slices of poached beef or buffalo meat, meatballs, stewed brisket, tendon, liver and various offal parts. An iconic Sabahan dish, ngiu chap has many different variations, from the lighter Hainanese style to heartier Hakka-influenced flavours, and even village-style ngiu chap adapted for indigenous tastes.
- Nuba laya/Nuba tinga is an ordinary rice wrapped with banana leaf or nyrik leaf. This dishes is to ease the farmer and the traveller for them to carry for a long journey. Usually this dishes is very famous among the Lun Bawang/Lundayeh people and this dishes a bit similarity to the linongot. However, this Nuba Tinga/Nuba laya is different because the rice is very soft and can bitten easily by senior citizen. Nuba means Rice, Laya means soft while tinga means wrapped thus Nuba laya means soft rice and nuba tingga means wrapped rice.
- Piaren Ah Manuk is a chicken curry made from a sauteed rempah base and grated coconut, then braised in coconut milk. This dish is very popular in the Iranun community. Variants include fish (Piaren Ah Sada) and unripe jackfruit (Piaren Ah Badak).
- Pinasakan or Pinarasakan is a home-style Kadazan-Dusun dish of fish simmered with takob-akob (dried skin of a mangosteen-like fruit which functions as a souring agent) or slices of unripe bambangan, as well as fresh turmeric leaves and rhizome.
- Sagol or sinagol is a Bajau speciality of fish which is first blanched and minced, then sauteed with turmeric, garlic, ginger, onions and crushed lemongrass. Traditionally the oil used is rendered fish liver oil, usually from the same fish used to prepare this dish. This dish may be prepared with shark, stingray and even puffer fish.

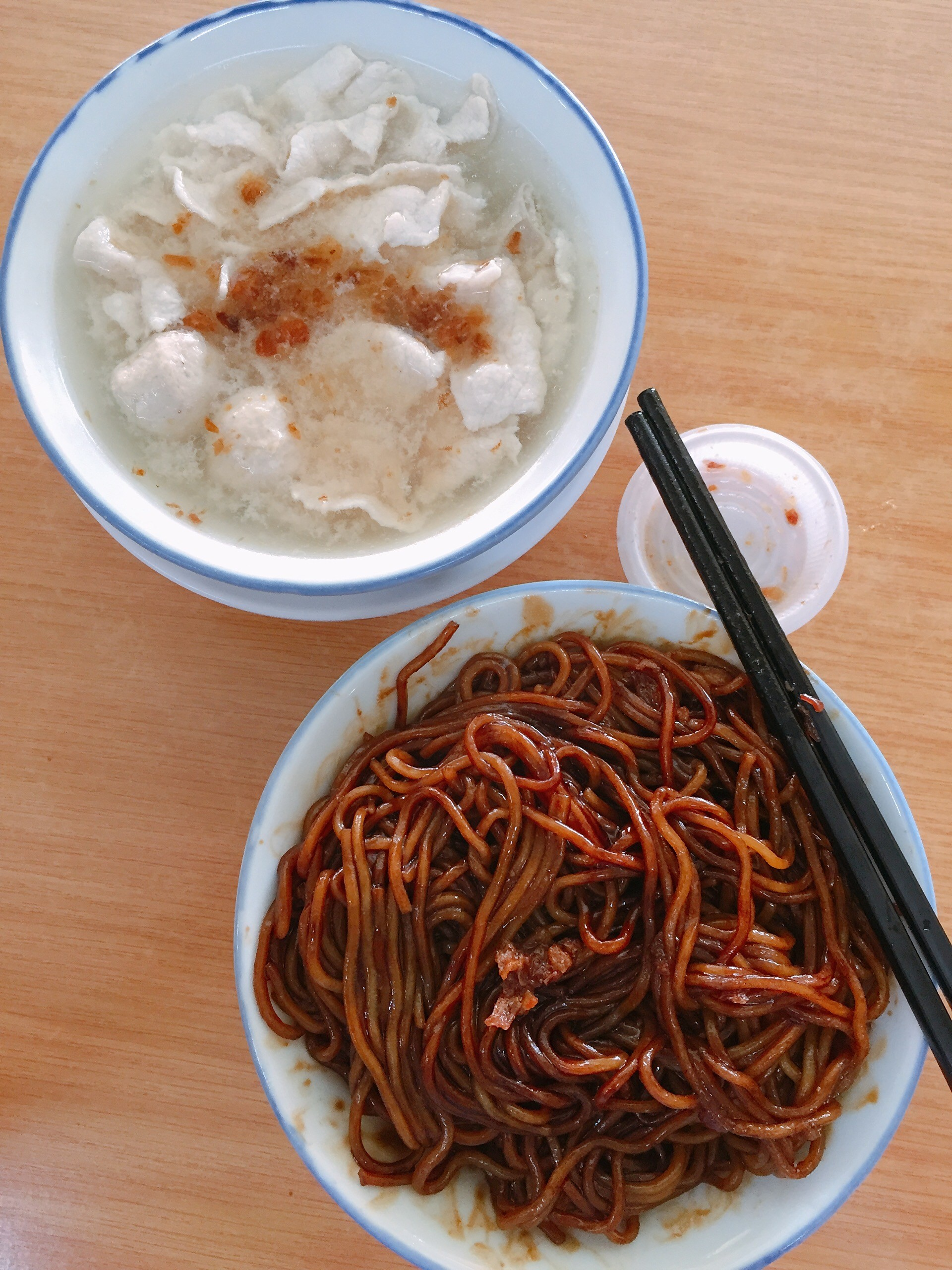
Sang nyuk mian (Dry variety)

- Sang nyuk mian (Chinese: 生肉面; pinyin: Shēngròu miàn) is a dish of noodles served with pork broth, originating from Tawau. Very popular with the non-Muslim communities of Sabah, it is named after the poached-to-order slices of tender marinated pork served in pork broth which is flavoured with fried lard bits. The noodles (usually thick yellow noodles) are either dressed in dark soy and lard, or dunked into the soup along with the aforementioned pork slices, vegetables, meatballs and offal.
- Sinalau refers to Kadazan-Dusun style smoked meat, which is usually wild boar or bakas. Barbecued on a char grill and eaten with rice and dipping sauces, sinalau bakas can be found and purchased in rural areas and towns. Halal versions substitute wild boar for other game meats like deer.
- Sinamu baka is a Lun Bawang/Lundayeh traditional food. This is a tangy fermented food same like bosou but the differences is sinamu baka only suitable for wild bear meat.
- Tompek is a Bajau food made from grated tapioca, eaten as an alternative starchy staple to rice. The grated tapioca is squeezed to dry out mixture and crumbled, then fried or toasted until golden brown. Grated tapioca may also be packed into cylindrical shapes and steamed until it forms into a chewy tubular cake called putu, another traditional Bajau staple.

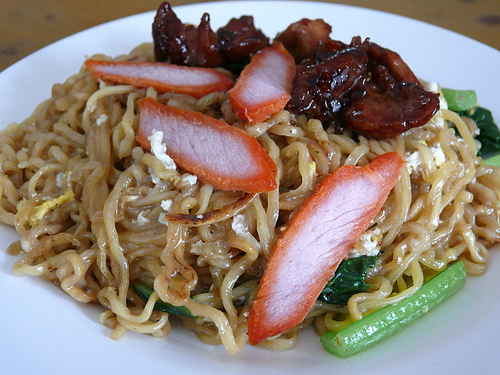
Tuaran mee.

- Tuaran mee (Chinese: 斗亚兰面; pinyin: Dòu yà lán miàn) is a speciality of Tuaran town. This dish of wok fried fresh handmade noodles is well known in the nearby city of Kota Kinabalu as well as in neighbouring Tamparuli town, where the localised adaptation is called Tamparuli mee (Chinese: 担波罗利炒生面; pinyin: Dān bō luó lì chǎo shēng miàn). The noodles must first be toasted with oil in the wok to prevent it from clumping together, then blanched to reduce the stiff crunchy texture from toasting. The final step involves stir frying the noodles to a dry finish with eggs, vegetables, and meat or seafood.
- Tuhau (Etlingera coccinea) is a type of wild ginger, specifically the stems of the same plant popularly served as a relish by the Kadazan-Dusun community. The stems are typically chopped up and served fresh with lime juice, or mixed with local chives and chilli peppers then cured with salt and vinegar. A more recent recipe called serunding tuhau involves slicing tuhau stems into thin floss-like shreds, which is then sauteed until it becomes golden and crisp. It has a distinctive scent which is said to have a polarising effect even among indigenous Sabahans.
- Ubi Daun Kayu is the tapioca leaves and also the traditional food for Murut and Lun Bawang/Lundayeh
- UFO tart (also known as cow-dung tart, Chinese: 牛屎挞; simplified Chinese: 牛屎塔; traditional Chinese: 牛屎撻; pinyin: níu shǐ tǎ) is a famous pastry in Sandakan town. It's made of custard & cream shaped like a cow dung on top of a thin fluffy slice of round shaped cake.

== Beverages ==
=== Non-alcoholic beverages ===
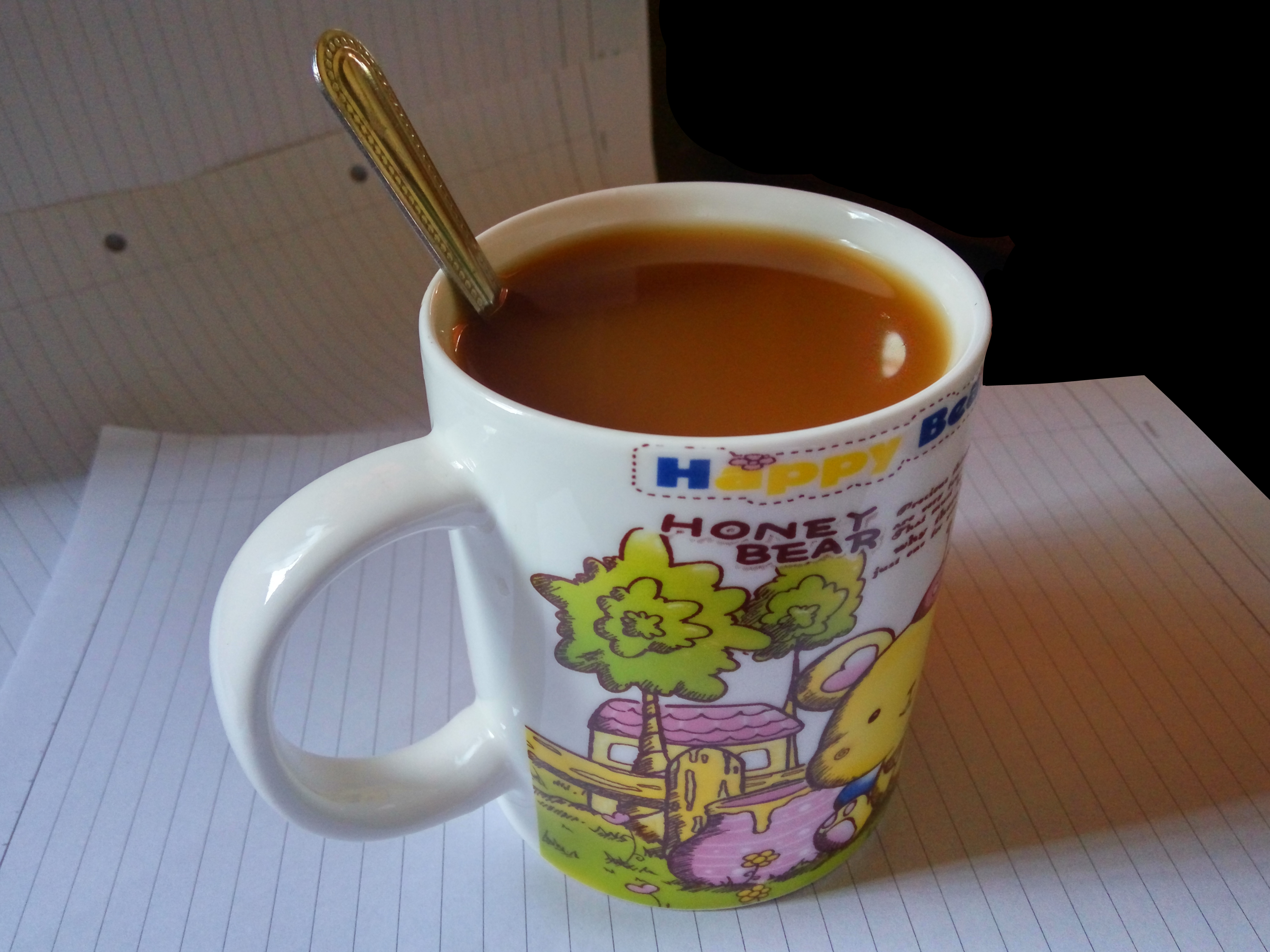
A mug of Tenom cream milk coffee.

- Sabah Tea is the main local tea brands of Sabah.
- Tenom coffee is the main local coffee brands of Sabah which processed using traditional firewood and drum rotation methods followed for almost 50 years without adding any artificial ingredients or colourings.

=== Alcoholic beverages ===
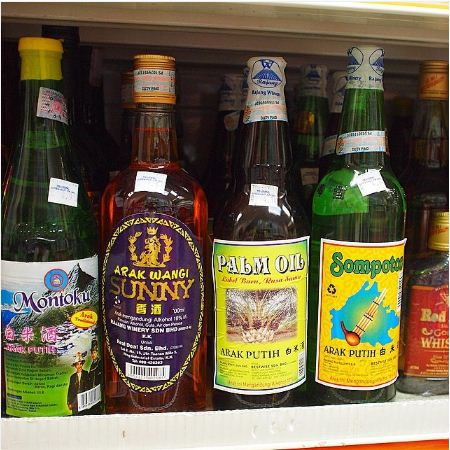
Local white wine brands in a market in Sabah.

- Bahar or 'baa is the Kadazan-Dusun variant of palm wine made with sap collected from the cut flower bud of a young coconut tree and a special type of tree bark called rosok, endemic to the Tuaran district. Pieces of the rosok is dipped into the coconut nectar during the fermentation process, which contributes a reddish hue to the final product.
- Lihing is a rice wine made exclusively from glutinous rice and natural yeast called sasad. Bittersweet in taste profile, lihing is a speciality of the Kadazan Penampang community, where it is still commonly brewed at home. Lihing can be used to make chicken soup (Sup Manuk Lihing), used in marinades, or even as an ingredient for meat pastries and stir-fried dishes. Commercially produced lihing, much pricier than the homebrewed version but consistent in quality, is also available in select souvenir shops. Lihing and similar rice wine variants from other Kadazan-Dusun communities may also be distilled to produce a hard liquor called montoku or talak.
- Tinonggilan is a slightly sparkling alcoholic drink made from maize. Tinonggilan is a Rungus speciality and is usually served during festive occasions, or as refreshments for guests during the performance of a ritual dance called Mongigol Sumundai.

== See also ==
- Sarawakian cuisine
- Penang cuisine
- Malaysian cuisine
- Philippine cuisine
- List of Malaysian dishes
