= Mee tauhu =

Noodle dish from Sabah, Malaysia

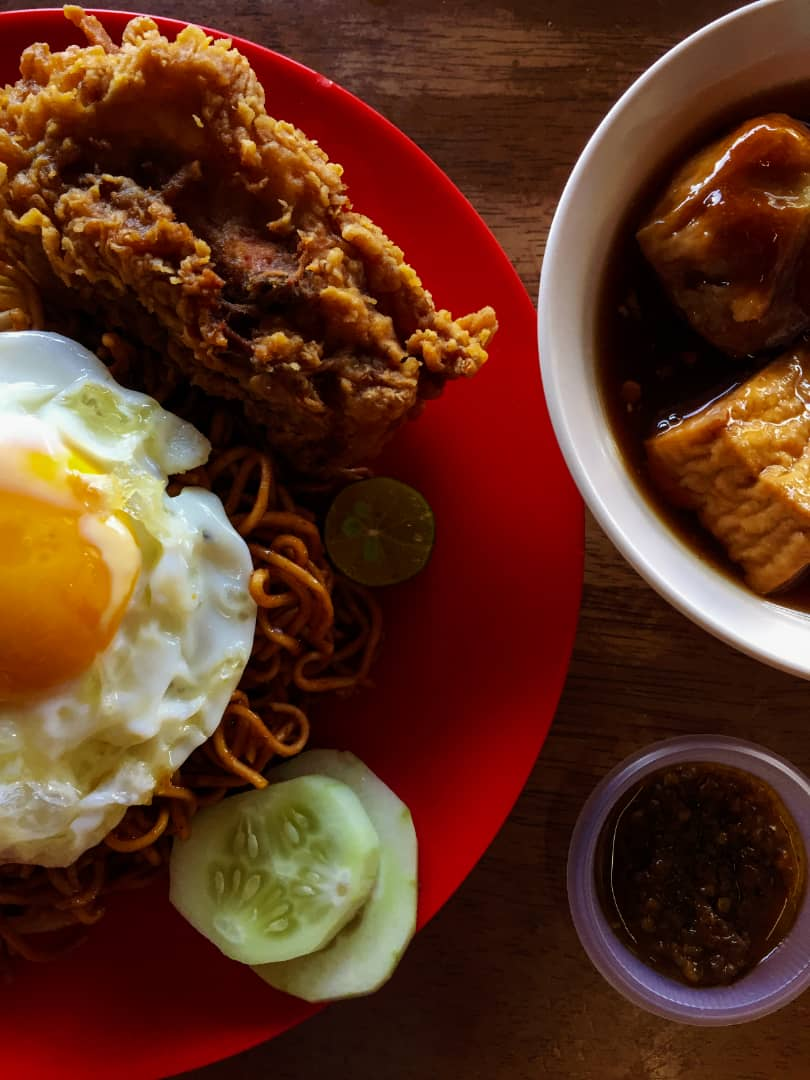
- A bowl of kuah mee tauhu (taucu gravy) (right), accompanied by sambal (bottom), alongside a plate of mee goreng topped with ayam goreng and a fried egg
- Type: Noodle dish
- Course: Main course
- Place of origin: Tawau, Malaysia
- Region or state: Sabah
- Associated cuisine: Sabahan cuisine
- Main ingredients: Egg noodles, taucu gravy, tofu, sambal

Mee tauhu (lit. 'Tofu noodle') is a noodle dish commonly associated with Tawau, a major town located in the southeastern part of Sabah, Malaysia. The dish is characterised by its taucu gravy and the inclusion of various types of tofu, contributing to its slightly savoury and umami flavour profile.

The noodle is widely enjoyed throughout Sabah, particularly in the eastern coastal regions such as Tawau, Sandakan, Kunak, Semporna, and Lahad Datu. Gaining popularity since the 2000s, it is primarily served as a breakfast dish; it can also be found on lunch and dinner menus, although less frequently. The dish reflects the cultural diversity of the region, incorporating influences from local Malaysian Chinese cuisine as well as local culinary traditions.

The appeal of mee tauhu lies in its simplicity and the versatility of its ingredients. The dish can be customised to suit individual preferences, and it has evolved over time to feature a variety of noodles and toppings, enhancing its popularity within Sabah.

== Ingredients ==
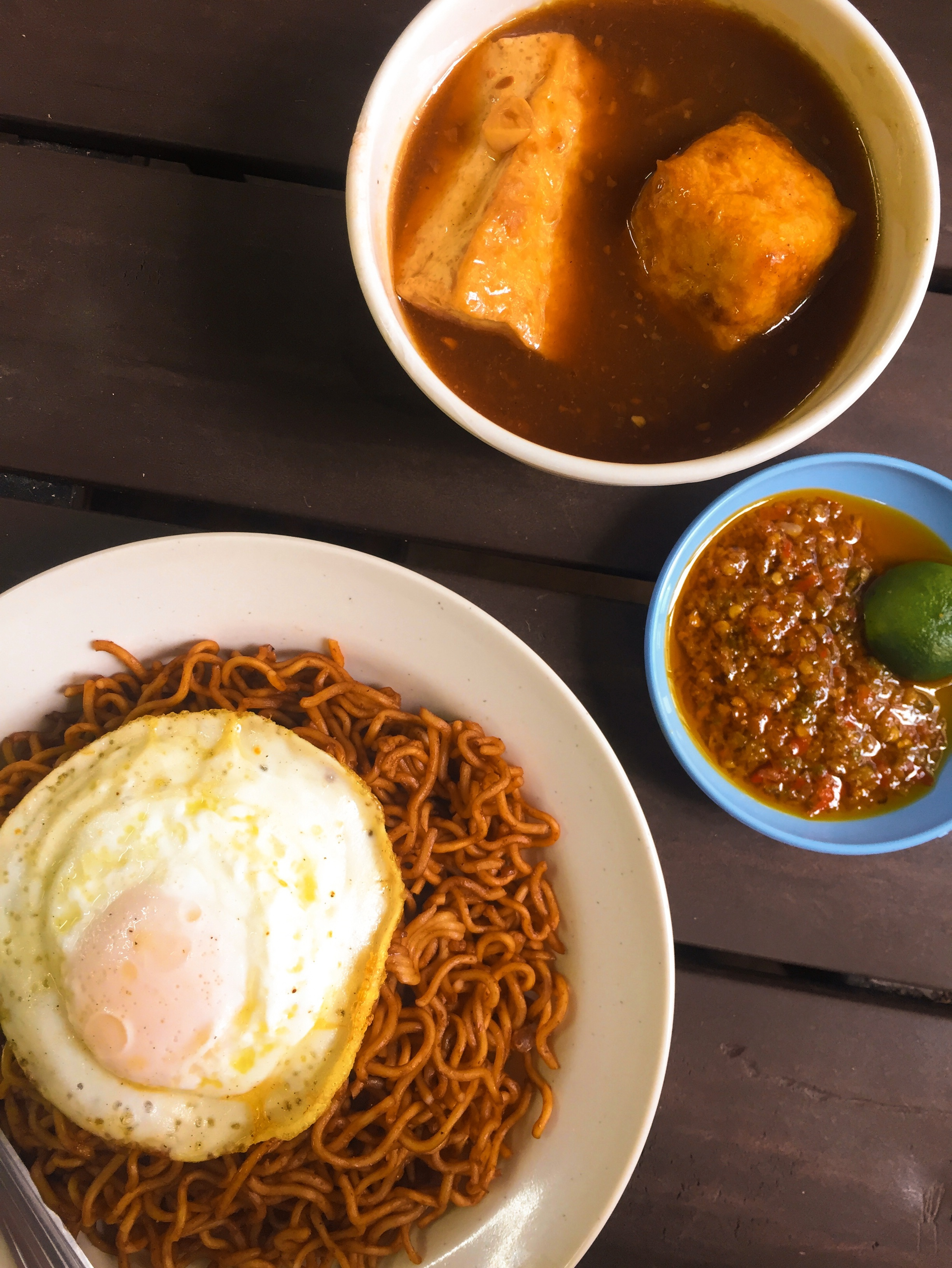
A plate of mee tauhu telur, featuring fried noodles topped with a fried egg, a bowl of taucu gravy and sambal

The primary components of mee tauhu include mee goreng, a slightly savoury taucu gravy and an assortment of tofu types. The most common noodles used are yellow noodles, which are stir-fried. Traditionally, these noodles are served separately from the taucu gravy, allowing diners to control the amount of sauce they prefer. This presentation enhances the dish's appeal, providing a satisfying contrast between the crunchy noodles and the rich gravy.

The taucu gravy is a defining element of mee tauhu, made from fermented soybean paste that imparts a distinctive salty and umami flavour. The preparation involves blending taucu with ingredients such as garlic, shallots, and a variety of seasonings, resulting in a rich, aromatic sauce that complements both the noodles and the tofu.

Tofu is a key ingredient in mee tauhu, providing both protein and texture. Various types of tofu are commonly used, including taufu pok (fried tofu puffs), which have a crispy exterior and a soft interior and taufu putih (white tofu), valued for its ability to absorb the flavours of the gravy. Another variation is cheese tofu, which incorporates a creamy cheese filling, adding a rich flavour and a unique texture to the dish.

In some variations, minced fish paste is stuffed into tofu, chillies or other vegetables, enhancing the dish with both flavour and substance. Additionally, grilled or fried tofu may be incorporated to introduce a smoky or crunchy element. These diverse tofu options contribute to the dish's overall complexity, catering to a variety of tastes and preferences.

A notable component of mee tauhu is sambal, a chilli paste served on the side that allows diners to adjust the dish's spiciness according to personal preference. Sambal is typically prepared from ingredients such as chilli peppers, garlic, and vinegar, adding both heat and complexity to the overall flavour.

== Variations ==
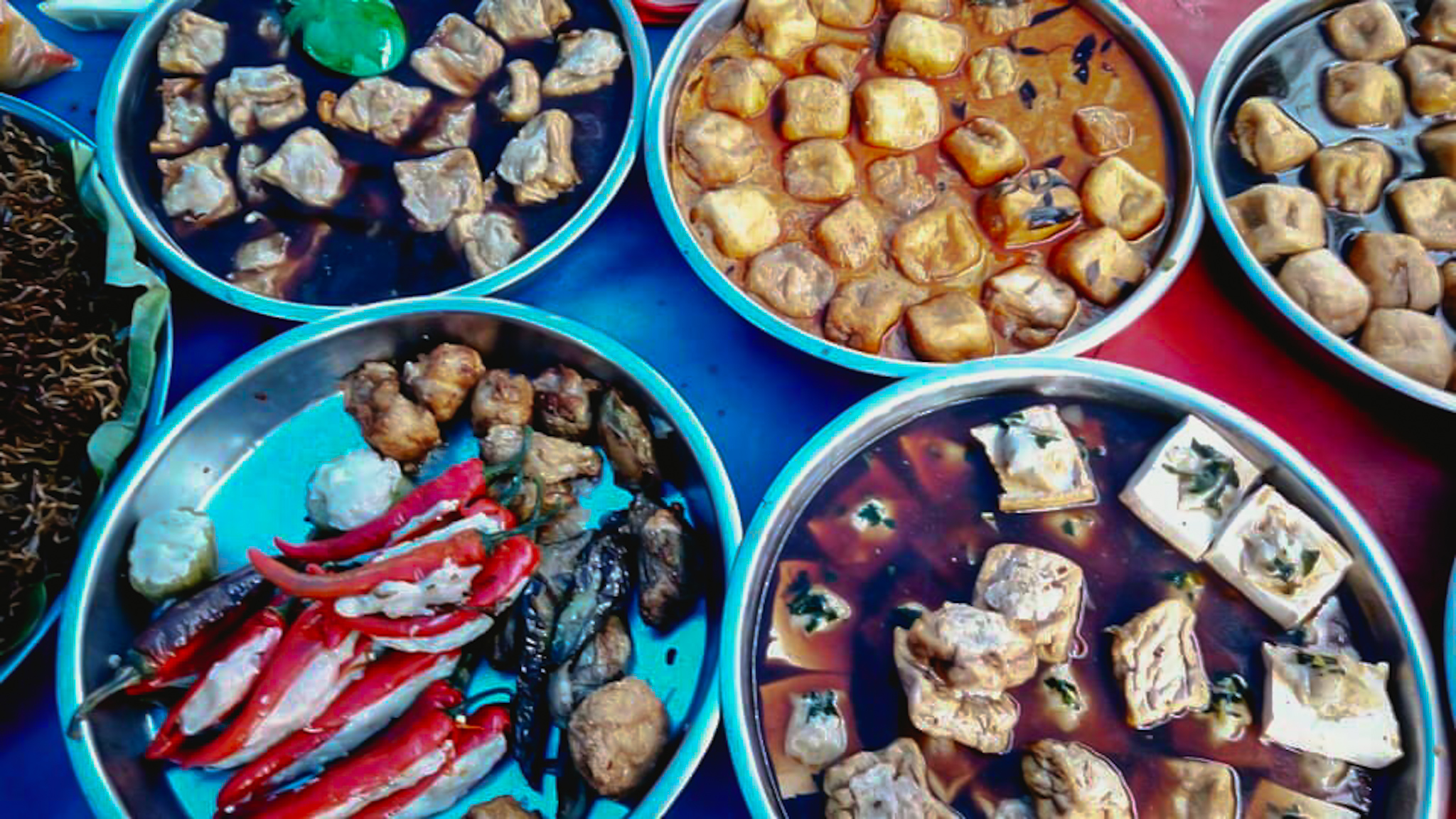
An assortment of side dishes for mee tauhu, featuring taucu gravy, curried tofu, fried tofu and fish paste stuffed vegetables

Mee tauhu features a variety of popular adaptations that cater to diverse tastes and preferences. The dish traditionally consists of yellow noodles and tofu served with a rich taucu gravy; however, many establishments offer unique variations that introduce different textures and flavours. For instance, lighter alternatives such as rice vermicelli or kuey teow, can be substituted for the yellow noodles. This change provides a different mouthfeel and subtly alters the dish's overall flavour profile.

Another notable variation is mee tauhu ikan, which incorporates seafood into the dish. In this version, sliced fish is placed atop the noodles, complementing the taucu gravy with an oceanic flavour. This adaptation is particularly popular in Kunak, Sabah, where local tastes favour seafood-infused meals.

Additionally, some variations of mee tauhu incorporate a curry-based gravy or a clear broth soup instead of the traditional taucu sauce. This modification results in a diverse range of flavour profiles, offering both stronger and milder tastes depending on the specific ingredients and preparation methods employed. The use of a curry-based gravy introduces a rich, spicy element that appeals to those who prefer more robust flavours, while a clear broth soup can provide a lighter and more delicate option.

Variations in tofu types also significantly impact the dish's overall enjoyment. Some recipes include grilled or deep-fried tofu, which adds a crunch and a smoky flavour. This textural contrast enhances the dish's appeal, offering a more varied dining experience.

== See also ==
- List of noodle dishes
- Sang nyuk mee, another noodle dish from Tawau; consisting of yellow egg noodles or rice vermicelli with pork
- Yum-yum, a dinner dish from Tawau; consisting of fried yong tau foo with sambal and fried mee hoon
