= Sinalau =

Smoked meat of the indigenous people in Sabah, Malaysia

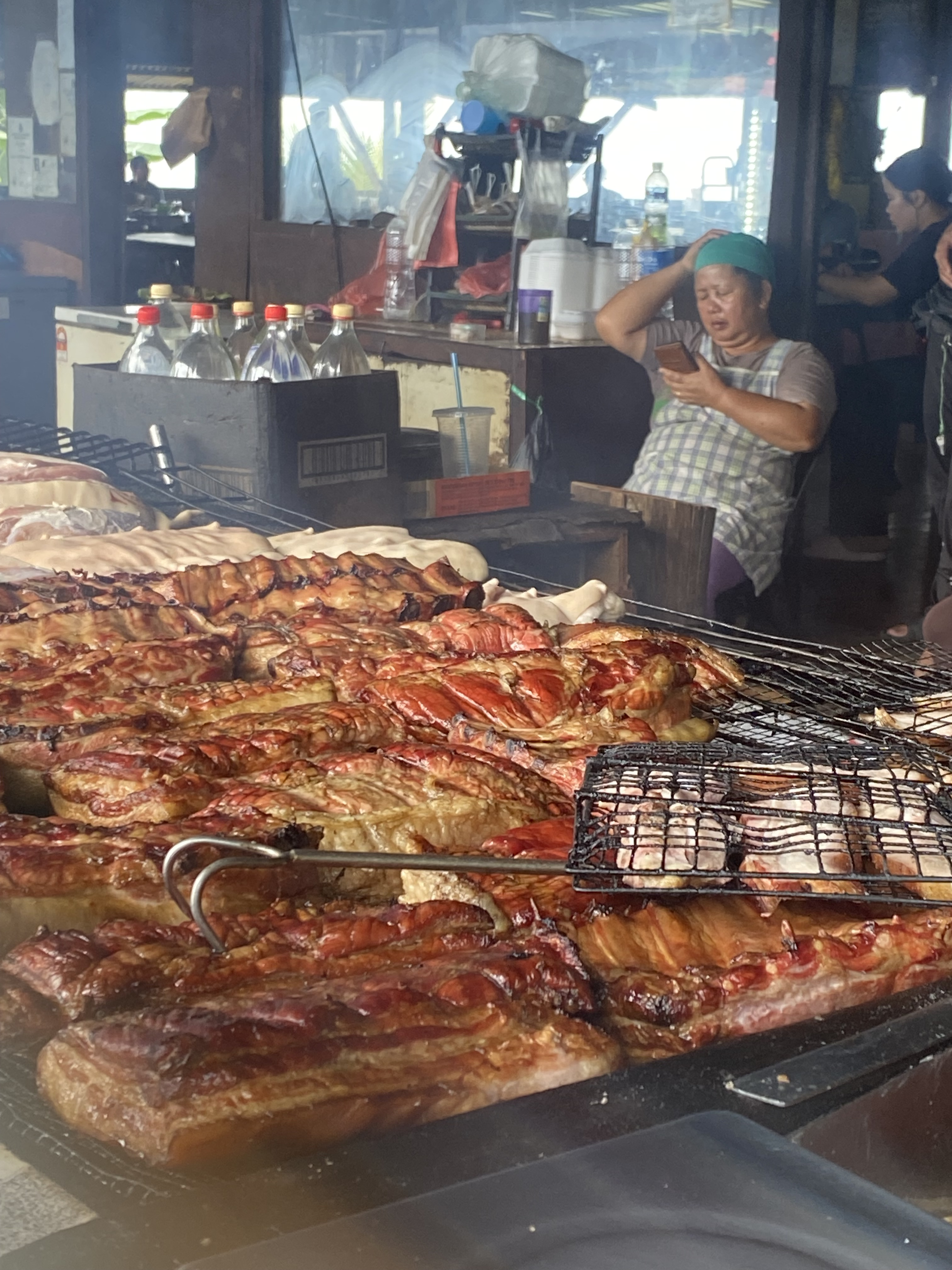
- Sinalau at the Himbaan Bongol food stall beside the Ranau–Tamparuli Road
- Alternative names: salau, sinalai
- Type: Smoked meat
- Course: Main course
- Place of origin: Malaysia
- Region or state: Sabah
- Associated cuisine: Sabahan cuisine
- Created by: Indigenous Kadazan, Dusun, Murut, and Rungus
- Main ingredients: Either wild boar, pig, chicken, beef, duck, venison or fish, indigenous spices with salt
- Ingredients generally used: Condiment: bird's eye chilli served with fresh kasturi (calamansi) lime and soy sauce, fermented shrimp paste (sambal belacan), and garlic, as well as vinegar
- Variations: Sinalau bakas (wild boar), sinalau wogok/vogok (domesticated pig), sinalau manuk (chicken), sinalau sapi (beef), sinalau payau (deer), sinalau putik (duck), and sinalau/sinalai sada (fish)

Sinalau, salau or sinalai refers to the types of traditional smoked meat common among the indigenous Kadazan, Dusun, Murut, and Rungus of Sabah in Malaysia. It can also be referred to as the traditional method employed by the indigenous ethnics of smoking meat over indirect firewood and charcoal heat, which is also considered as a symbol of Sabah's cultural richness and culinary tradition.

== Etymology ==
In the Dusunic languages, the word sinalau carries the meaning of "smoked", referring to meat that was dried with fire. The word was further compiled by British Consul in Brunei Spenser St. John in his list of "Vocabularies on the Dayak languages of Borneo" regarding the indigenous people he met throughout his life and service on the island, which was later published in "The Natives of Sarawak and British North Borneo" by English-born anthropologist and museum curator Henry Ling Roth in 1896.

== Sinalau by types ==
Sinalau can be divided into several further variations depending on the meat that is being used. The most common types of sinalau, including:

=== Sinalau bakas ===
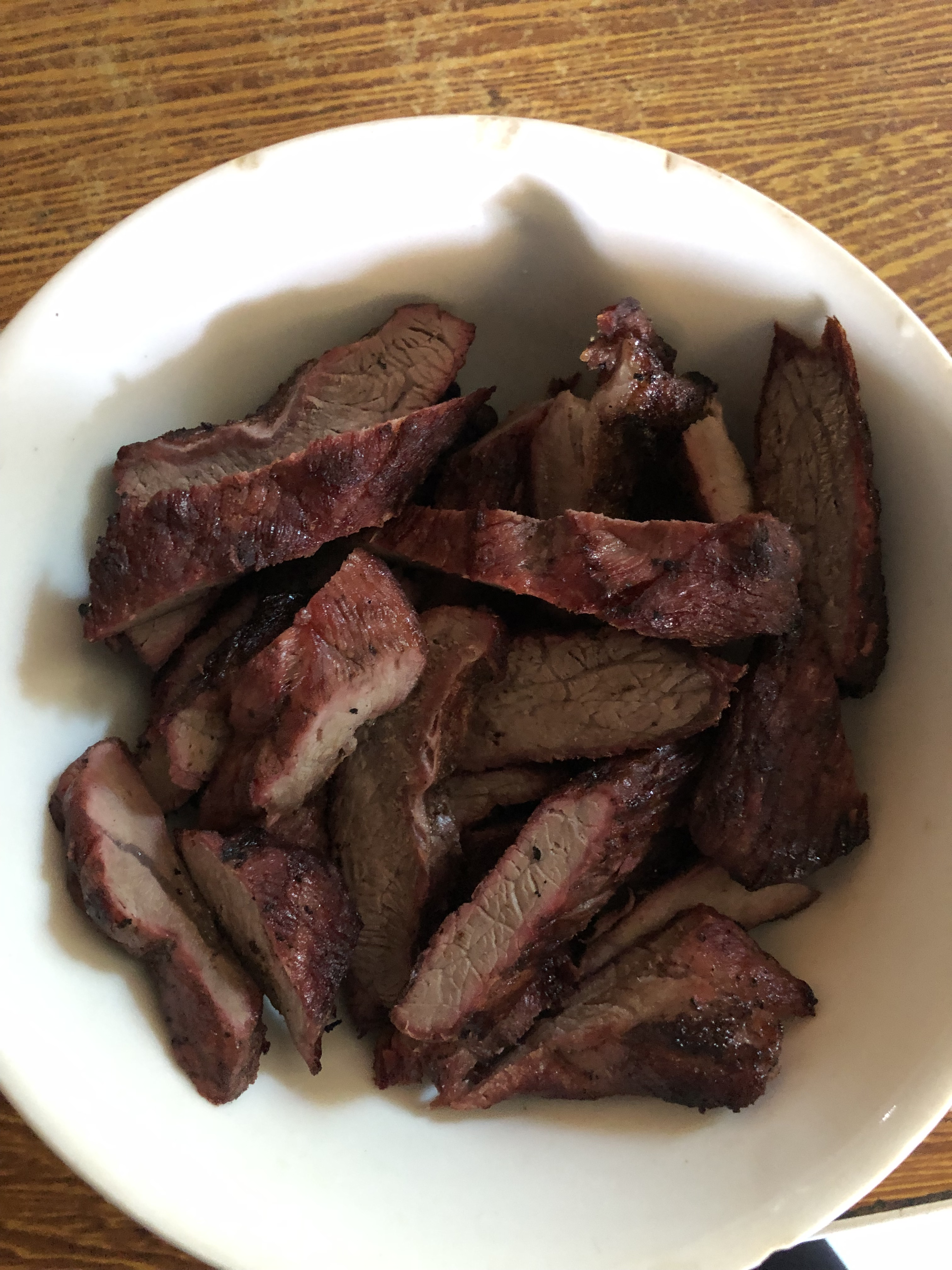
Sinalau bakas (smoked wild boar) in a bowl

This type of sinalau preparation involves the selection of fresh wild boar meat (called bakas) obtained through hunting activities in the surrounding interior forests of Borneo. Once retrieved, the fresh meat is cut into large pieces and marinated with a mixture of salt and local herbs such as garlic, ginger, lemongrass, and turmeric. After the marinating process, the meat is then grilled over slow firewood, with the process taking several hours, during which the meat is hung over the fire and the smoke from the wood gives a unique aroma and flavour.

It is common being served with main commercial alcoholic drinks such as Carlsberg, Guinness, Heineken, and Tiger Beer. Along the route from Tamparuli to Kundasang Valley, especially around Kelawat Village, various roadside stalls selling fresh sinalau bakas are available, although these stalls usually operate irregularly, depending on their fresh catch. Other inner Sabah districts such as Keningau, Kota Belud, Ranau, Tambunan, and Telupid are also famous for selling the delicacy, especially at the local tourist markets.

=== Sinalau wogok/vogok ===
The sinalau wogok is another version of indigenous smoked meat which uses the domesticated pig meat, typically served with linugu/linopot (steamed glutinous rice wrapped in leaves) and shrimp paste condiments. Wogok/vogok carries the meaning of "pig" in local Tambunan Dusun and Coastal Kadazan language. This type of sinalau is available throughout the roadside stalls within the Penampang–Papar–Kimanis road, in the Pan Borneo Highway, which is the traditional home of the local Kadazan people.

=== Sinalau manuk, sapi, payau and sada ===
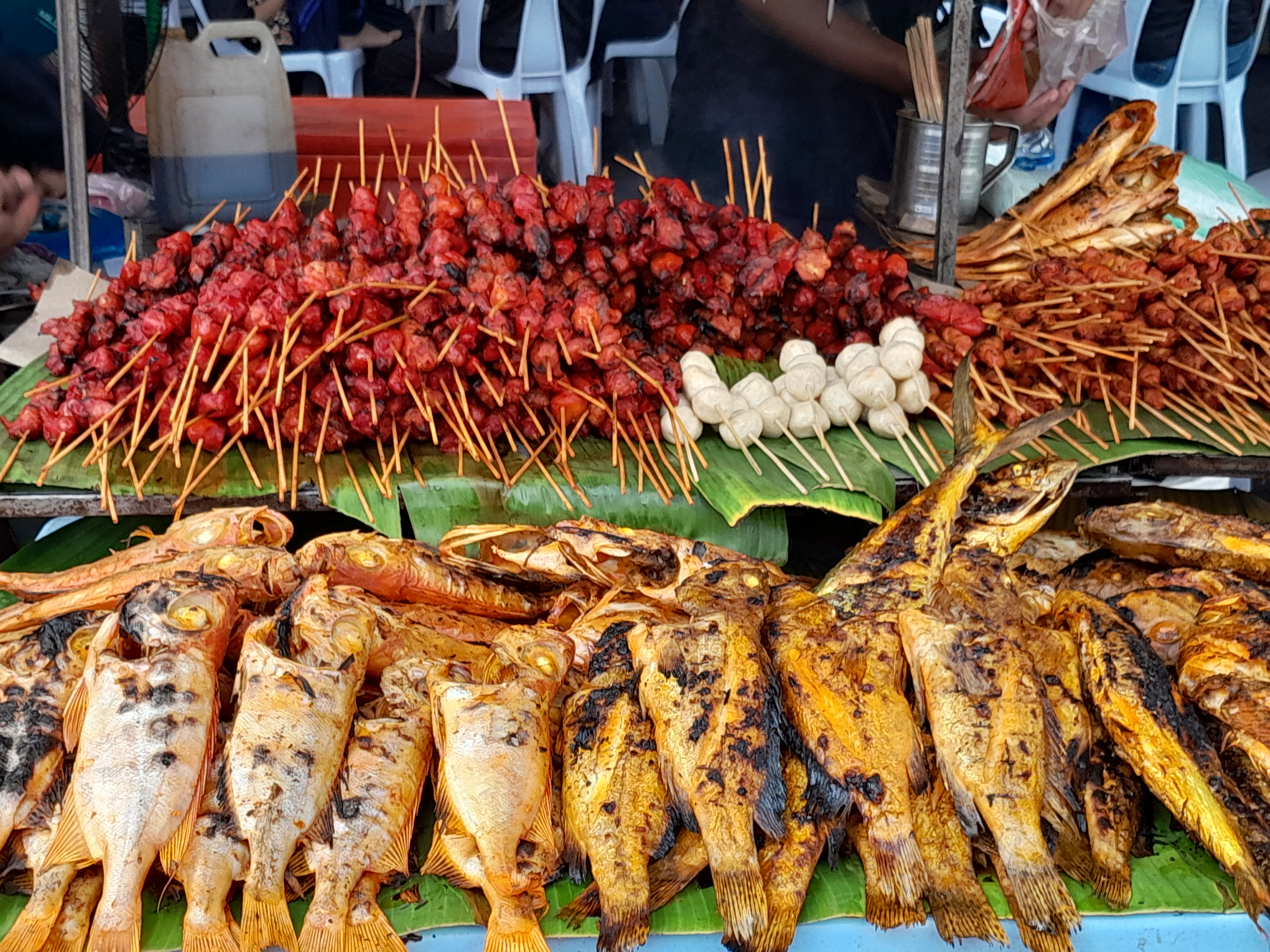
Sinalau manuk om sada (chicken and fish) version of smoked meat

The sinalau manuk is another variation often served as a popular roadside delicacy, featuring chicken meat marinated in local Kadazan-Dusun indigenous herbs and smoked slowly over firewood, where it is also popular as a halal alternative among Muslim consumers to traditional Sabahan smoked meat aside from the sinalau sapi (the beef variant), sinalau payau (the deer variant) and sinalau sada (the fish variant). The sinalau sapi is available either using commercial beef or village-raised livestock. The payau is another rarest variant, since it is available based on seasons, with the meat marinated and smoked traditionally, sometimes using mangrove wood for additional aroma. The sada, another variant of sinalau, is usually from river fish such as tinfoil barb (lampan/lampam) or tilapia that will be cleaned, marinated in salt, and slowly smoked over wood embers until it is dry, smoky, and crispy on the outside.

== See also ==
- List of cooking techniques
- List of smoked foods
- Pig roast
- Street food
