= Linopot =

Traditional dish of Sabah, Malaysia

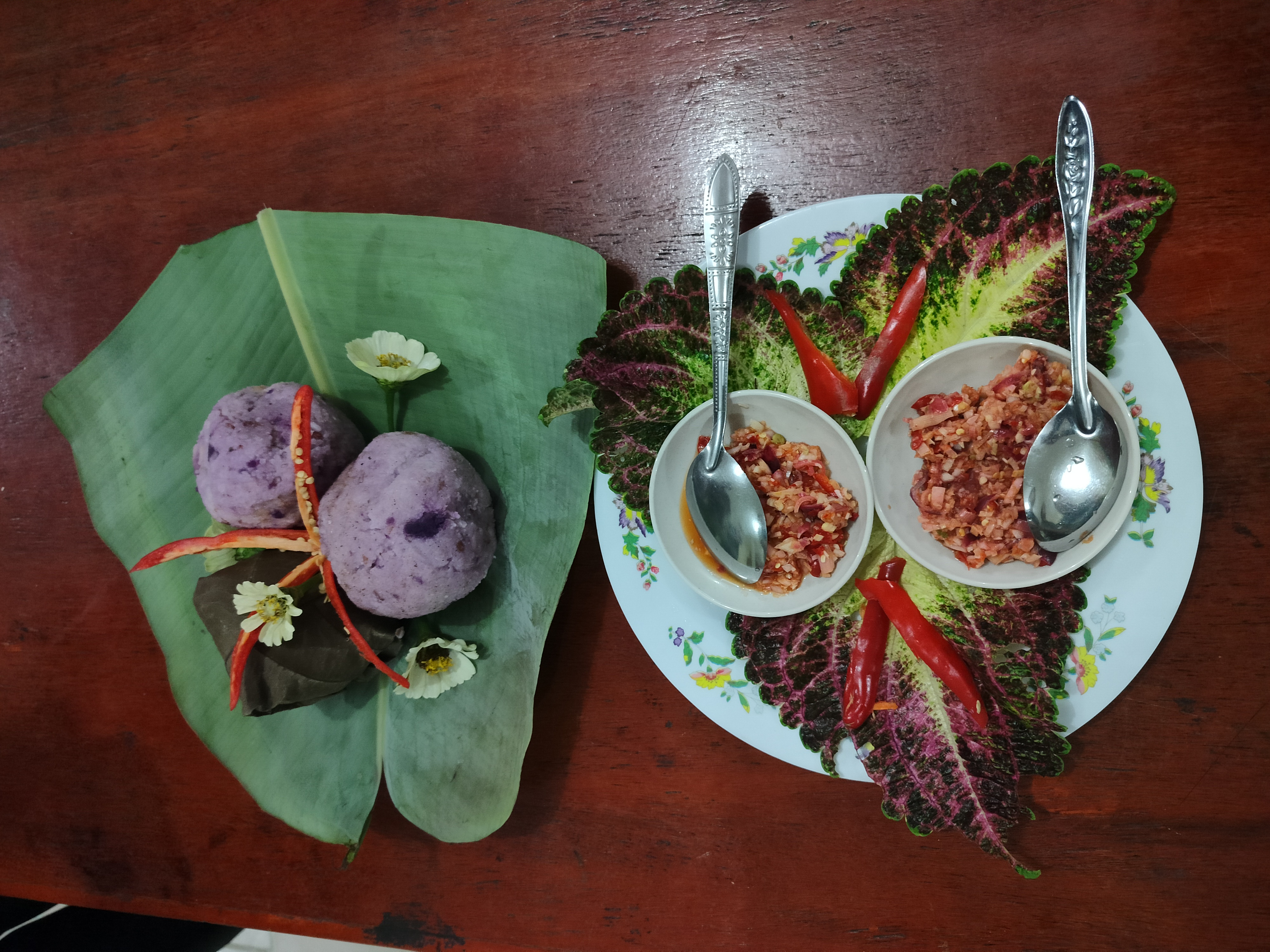
- Linopot (left) served with tuhau sambal (right) in Sabah, Malaysia
- Alternative names: hinopot, kazot, linongot, and sinamazan
- Type: Dish
- Place of origin: Malaysia
- Region or state: East Malaysia (Sabah)
- Associated cuisine: Sabahan cuisine
- Created by: Kadazan-Dusun; Murut; Rungus
- Main ingredients: Hill rice (Sabah heirloom rice) or sticky rice, yam, cassava, or sweet potato
- Food energy (per serving): 150 kcal (630 kJ)

Linopot (also known as linongot in various Dusunic dialects) is a traditional native rice dish among the indigenous Kadazan-Dusun, Murut and Rungus of Sabah, Malaysia, commonly prepared using hill rice or sticky rice wrapped in either doringin (terminalia catappa), tarap (artocarpus odoratissimus) or banana leaves. Popular through the celebration of Kaamatan, the dish is also available through most of Sabah's coffeehouses and restaurants serving traditional foods.

== Origin and background ==
The dish is considered a special traditional food among Sabah's Dusunic and Murutic indigenous peoples. A different versions of linopot exist within the two tribes. In the Kadazan-Dusun language, linopot means "tightly wrapped", referring to rice that is neatly wrapped. In the past, the dish was commonly made into practical and easy-to-carry food supplies when indigenous farmers worked in the fields, hunted, or travelled deep into the forest. In traditional preparation, hill paddy is the mostly used for the making, where it can be mixed with other starchy crops such as yam, to create different types of rice. Some of the examples are:

- Gu'ol rice (rice mixed with yam)
- Kasou rice (rice mixed with sweet potato)
- Mundok rice (rice mixed with cassava)
- Tadong rice (Black hill paddy rice)
- Takano (rice in Dusun language)
- Tawadak rice (rice mixed with pumpkin)

== Preparation ==
Rice (usually from upland rice) or sticky rice is mixed or pounded with ingredients such as cassava, yam, purple sweet potato, or sweet pumpkin while still hot, then wrapped neatly using natural leaves such as tarap leaves, banana leaves, or doringin leaves. Other leaves that can be used as wrapper including the kobu/nyirik (phacelophrynium maximum), tintap (dillenia suffruticosa), longkobung (macaranga tanarius), and toropoi, each of which has its own aroma. The rice are further served usually with any fish, meat, chicken, salted eggs or other traditional dishes such as tuhau sambal, hinava, bambangan (mangifera pajang), and sinalau meats.

== Gallery ==
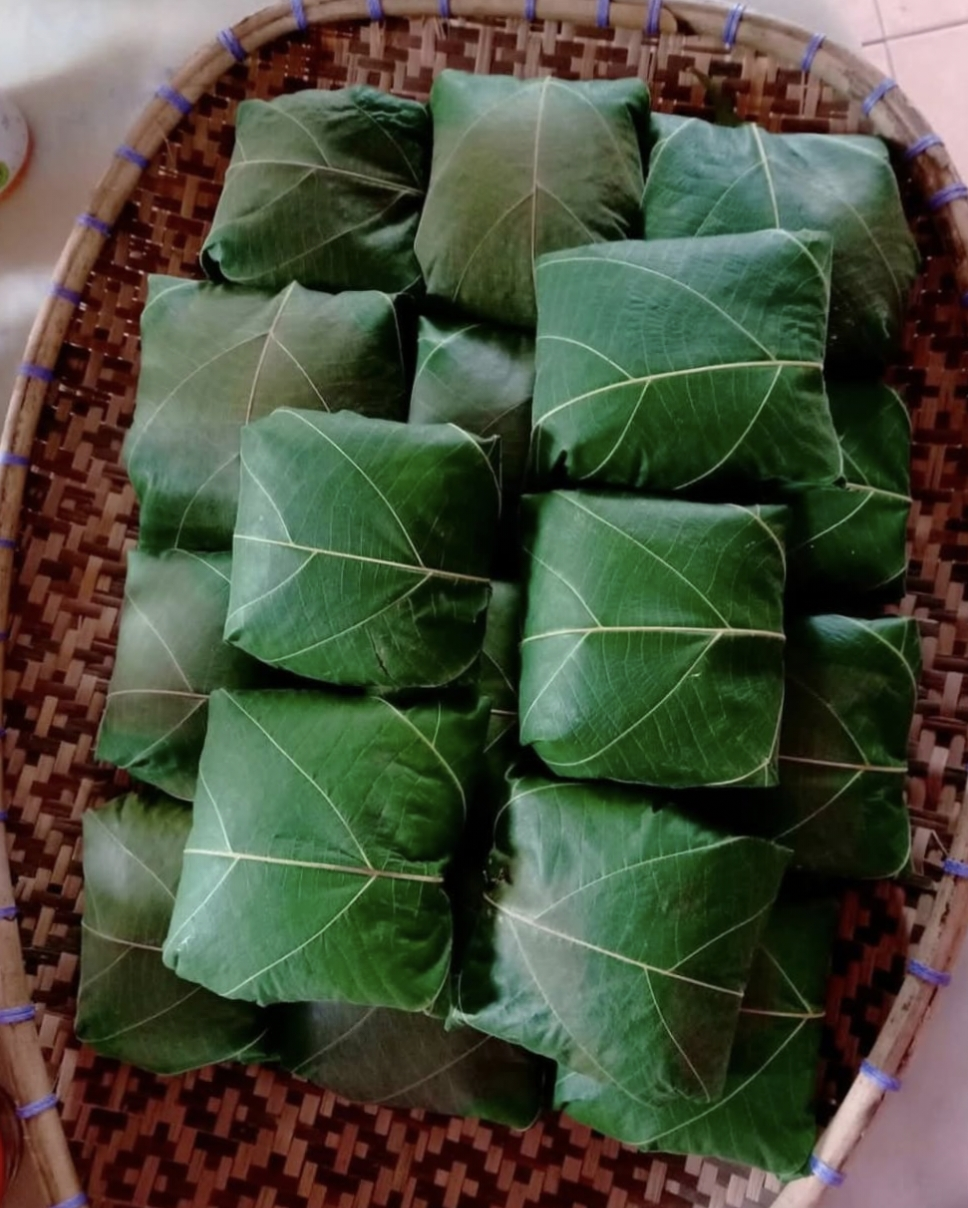
Linopot wrapped in leaves

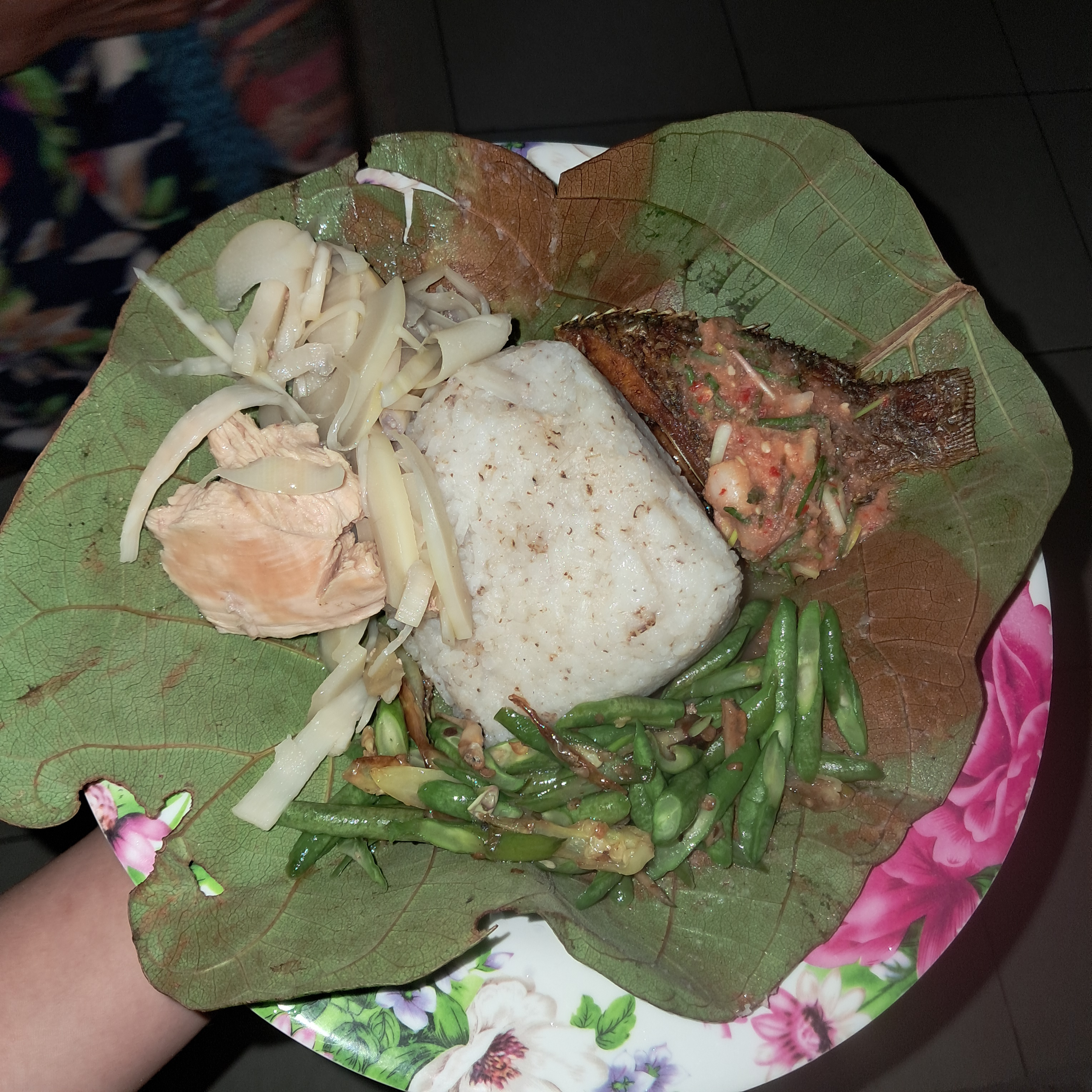
The dish served with white sticky rice

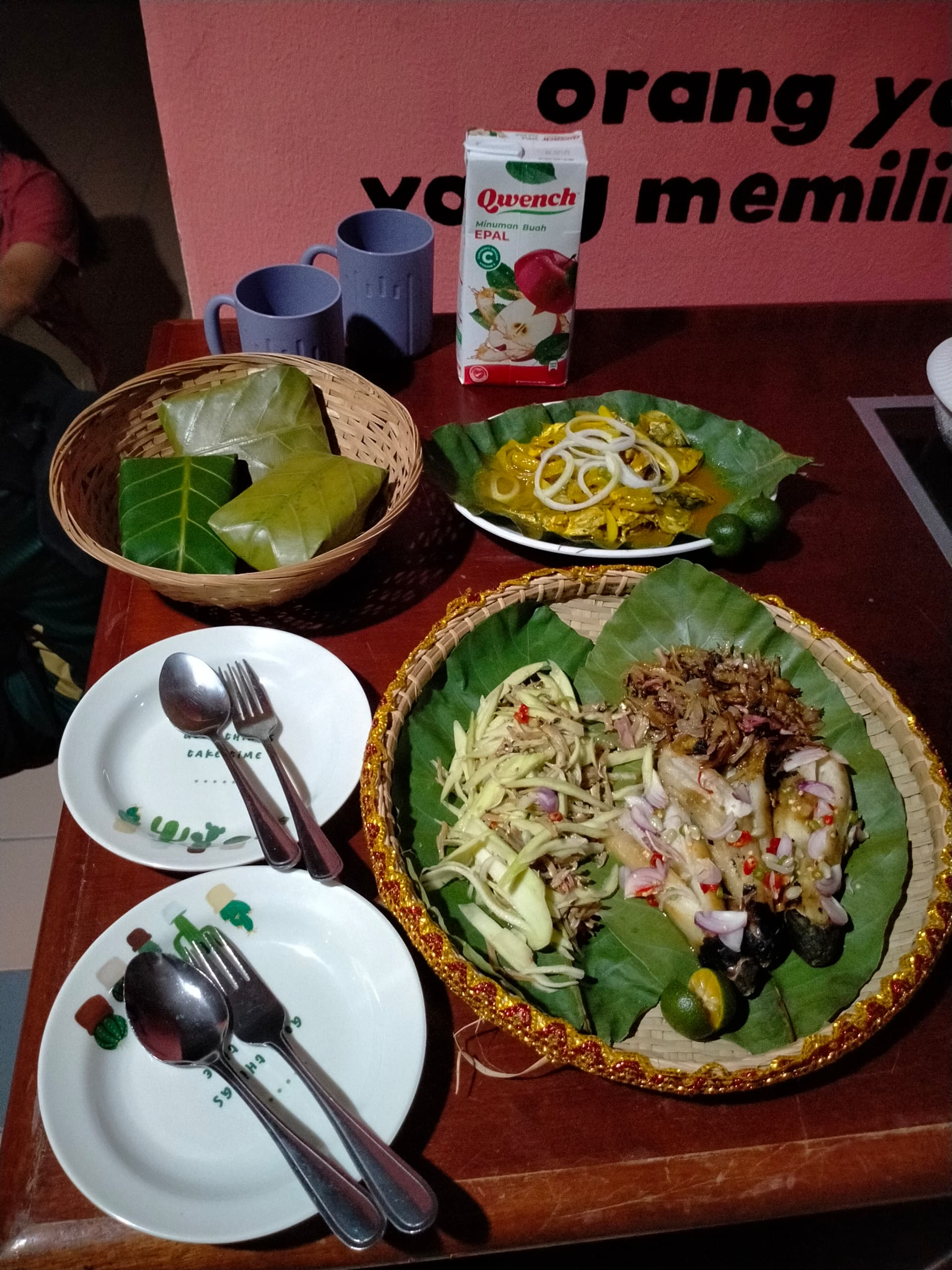
The dish served with other traditional Kadazan-Dusun foods

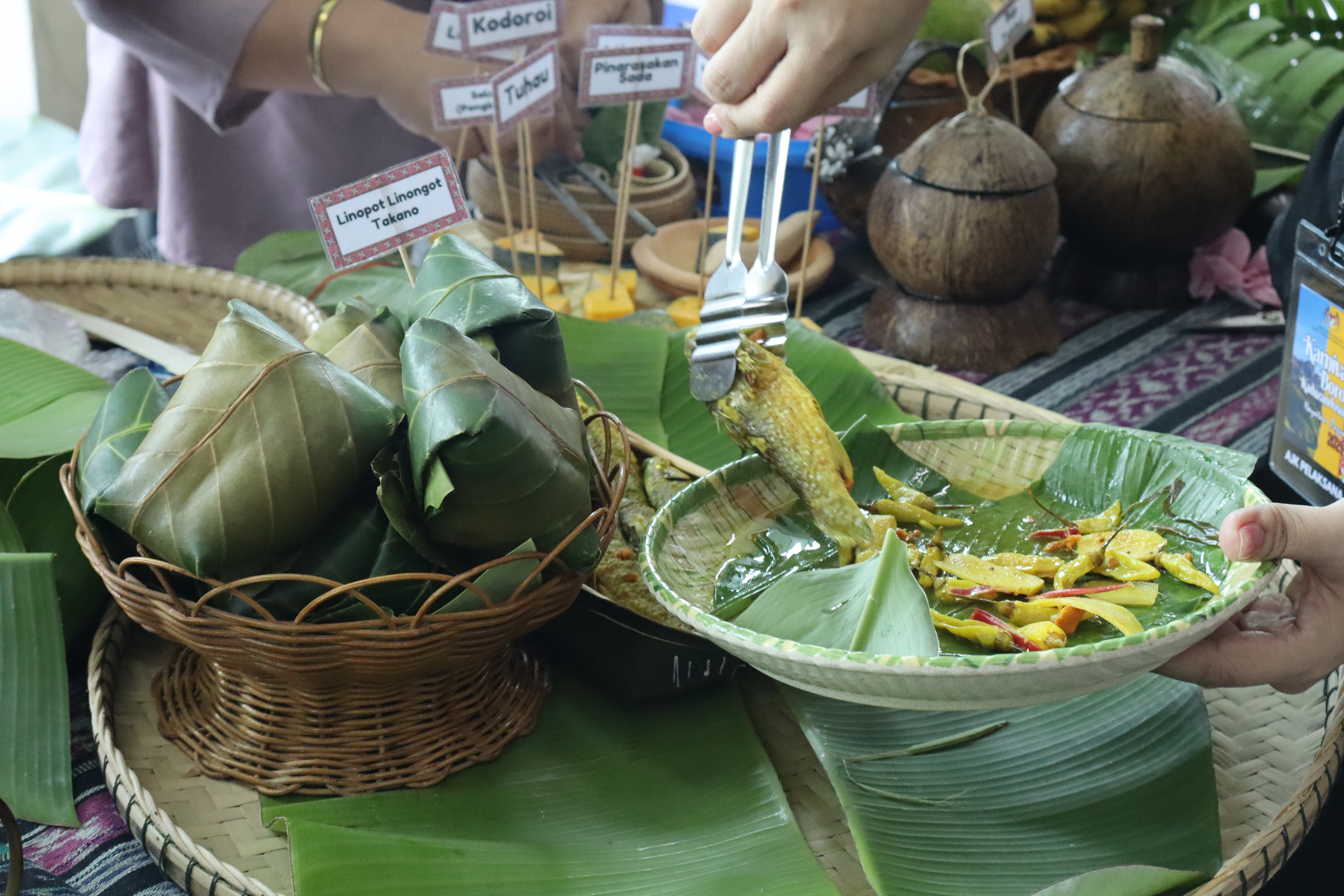
Linopot served during a cultural food festive

== See also ==
- List of rice dishes
