= Beaufort mee =

Egg noodle dish with chicken from Sabah, Malaysia

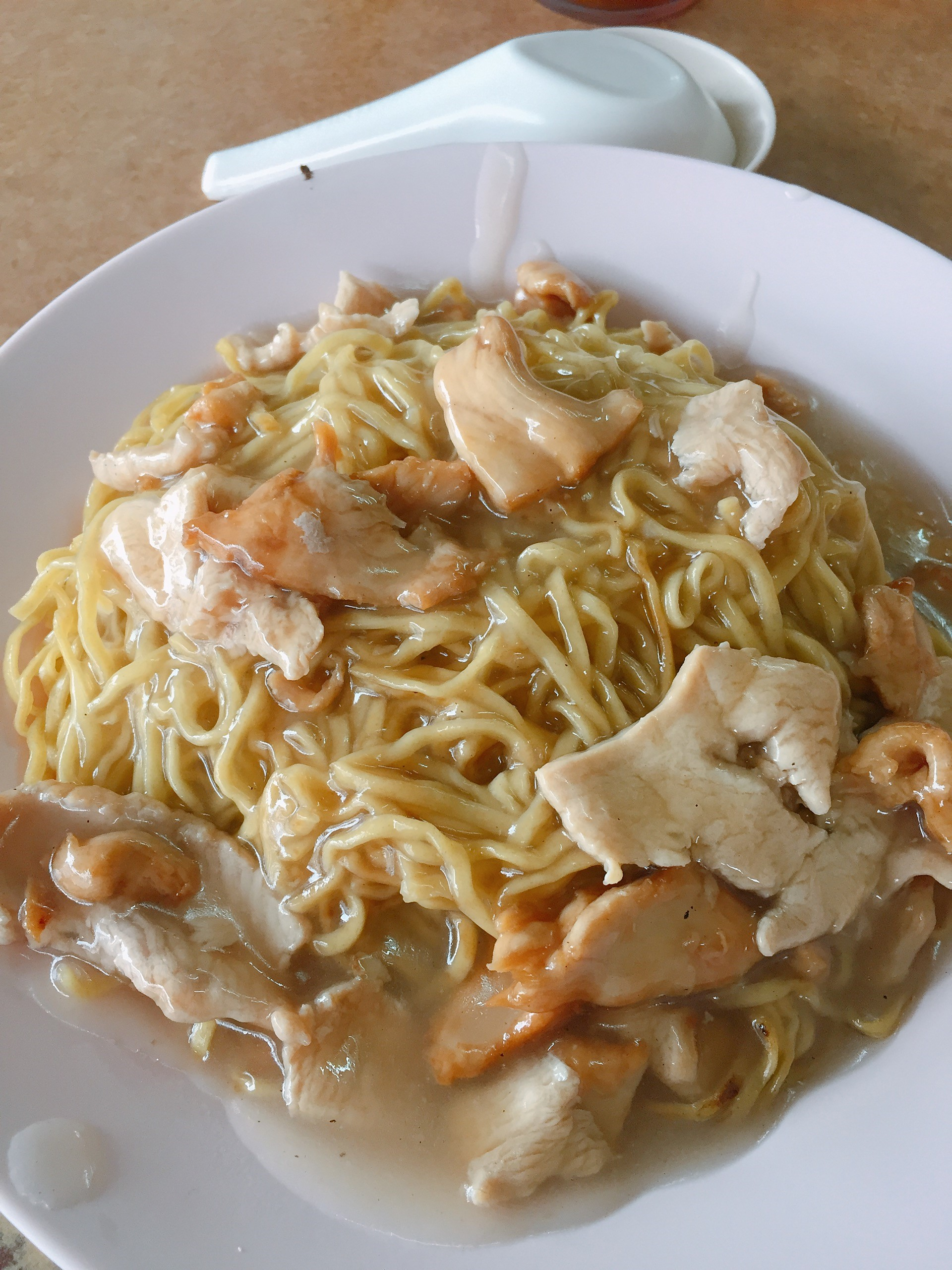
- Sabah Beaufort mee with slices of chicken
- Alternative names: mi beaufort; beaufort noodle
- Type: Noodle dish
- Course: Main course
- Place of origin: Beaufort, Malaysia
- Region or state: Sabah
- Associated cuisine: Sabahan cuisine
- Main ingredients: Soft springy egg noodles with either sliced chicken, barbecued pork (char siu), or seafood, and crunchy leafy greens
- Ingredients generally used: Chicken or pork bone broth, chopped garlic, light soy sauce, oyster sauce, salt, white pepper, sesame oil, and cooking oil

Beaufort mee, or mee Beaufort (Malay: Mi Beaufort; Chinese: 保佛面; pinyin: Bǎo fó miàn), is a Sabahan dish consisting of springy egg noodles, sliced chicken and barbecued pork (char siu), as well as crunchy leafy greens originating from the southwestern part of Beaufort town in Sabah, Malaysia. The noodle is served wet fried with either meats doused in chicken and garlic gravy.

== Origin and background ==
The noodle traces its origin among the local Chinese in the town of Beaufort in Sabah, usually served in most of the town kopitiams and restaurants. With the increasing popularity throughout Malaysia, other Beaufort mee restaurant branch also has a presence in West Malaysia.

== Preparation ==
The noodle, together with Tenom noodles, is served gravy, where it is prepared by frying the egg noodles until charred. It is often paired with meats such as chicken and sliced pork, either char siew (barbecued pork) or sau nyuk (roasted pork belly), together with choy sum in gravy, and a variation of seafood is also available with slices of shrimp, prawn or fish.

== See also ==
- List of noodle dishes
