= Choy sum =

Leafy vegetable

Choy sum (Cantonese) Cai xin (Mandarin)
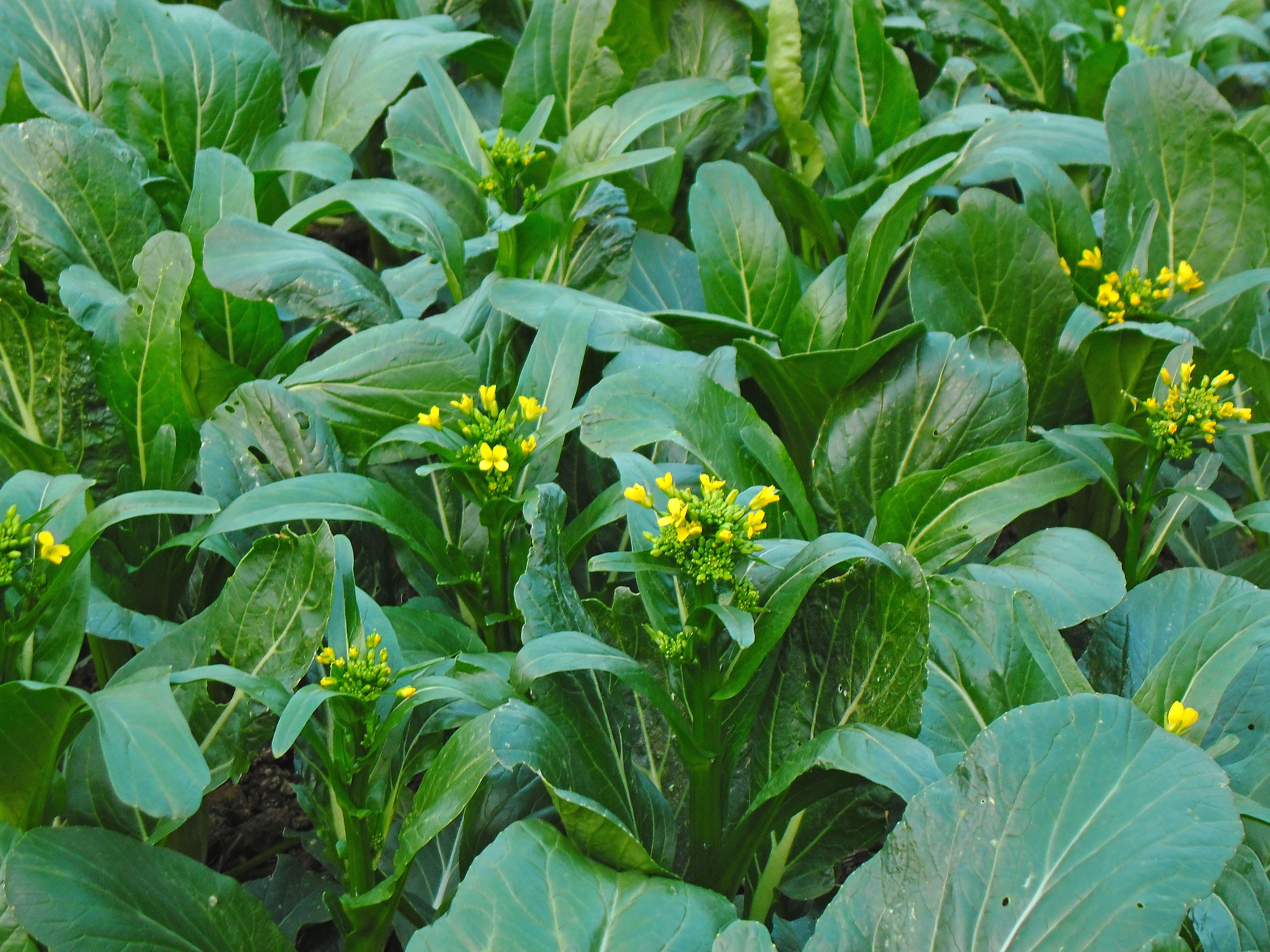
- Choy sum plants, growing on a farm
- Species: Brassica rapa var. parachinensis
- Cultivar group: Chinensis, Pekinensis groups
- Origin: China, before the 15th century
- Cultivar group members: Many; see text.

Choy sum (cai xin)
- Chinese: 菜心
- Hanyu Pinyin: càixīn
- Jyutping: coi^{3}sam^{1}
Transcriptions
Standard Mandarin
- Hanyu Pinyin: càixīn
- IPA: [tsʰâɪ.ɕín]
Yue: Cantonese
- Jyutping: coi^{3}sam^{1}
- IPA: [tsʰɔ̄ːy sɐ́m]
Southern Min
- Hokkien POJ: chhài-sim or tshài-sim

Choy sum (also spelled choi sum or choi sam in Cantonese; caixin (Chinese: 菜心; pinyin: càixīn) in Standard Mandarin) is a leafy vegetable commonly used in Chinese cuisine. It is a member of the genus Brassica of the mustard family, Brassicaceae (Brassica rapa var. parachinensis or Brassica chinensis var. parachinensis). Choy sum is a transliteration of the Cantonese name (Chinese: 菜心), which can be literally translated as "heart of the vegetable". Choy sum is also called yu choy (you cai in Standard Mandarin; Chinese: 油菜). It is also known as Chinese flowering cabbage.

== Description ==
Choy sum is a green leafy vegetable similar to gai lan, and can be characterized by the distinct yellow flowers which it bears. Each flower has four yellow, oval to round petals with six stamens on fleshy, erect stems which are 0.5 to 1 centimetre (1/4 to 1/2 inch) in diameter and 15 to 20 cm (6 to 8 in) tall with light to dark green, and are oval (becomes acuminate shaped, or basal-shaped near the flowering stage) with slightly serrated margins leaves, which never forms compact heads like the cabbage. Fruits can develop out of cross-pollination or self-pollination, and are silique structured, that open at maturity through dehiscence or drying to bare open to brown or black seeds that are small and round in shape. A single pod can bear 4 to 46 seeds.

The height of the plant varies greatly, ranging from 10 to 40 cm (4 to 16 in) depending on the growing conditions and the variety. Flowering usually appears when there are about 7 to 8 leaves on the plant or about 20 cm (8 in) tall. The bulk of the root system is found within a depth of 12 cm (4 1/2 in) and is confined to a radius of 12 cm (4 1/2 in).

The whole plant is overall an annual, herbaceous plant, rarely perennial, rarely growing into subshrubs. The whole plant consists of a simple or branched (when it is near the flowering stage), leafy structure. It grows best in soil with a minimum pH level of 5.6, maximum pH level of 7.5.

== Use ==
Choy sum is highly valued as a vegetable in China and Japan. It is commonly consumed in soup, blanched, or stir-fried.

== Gallery ==
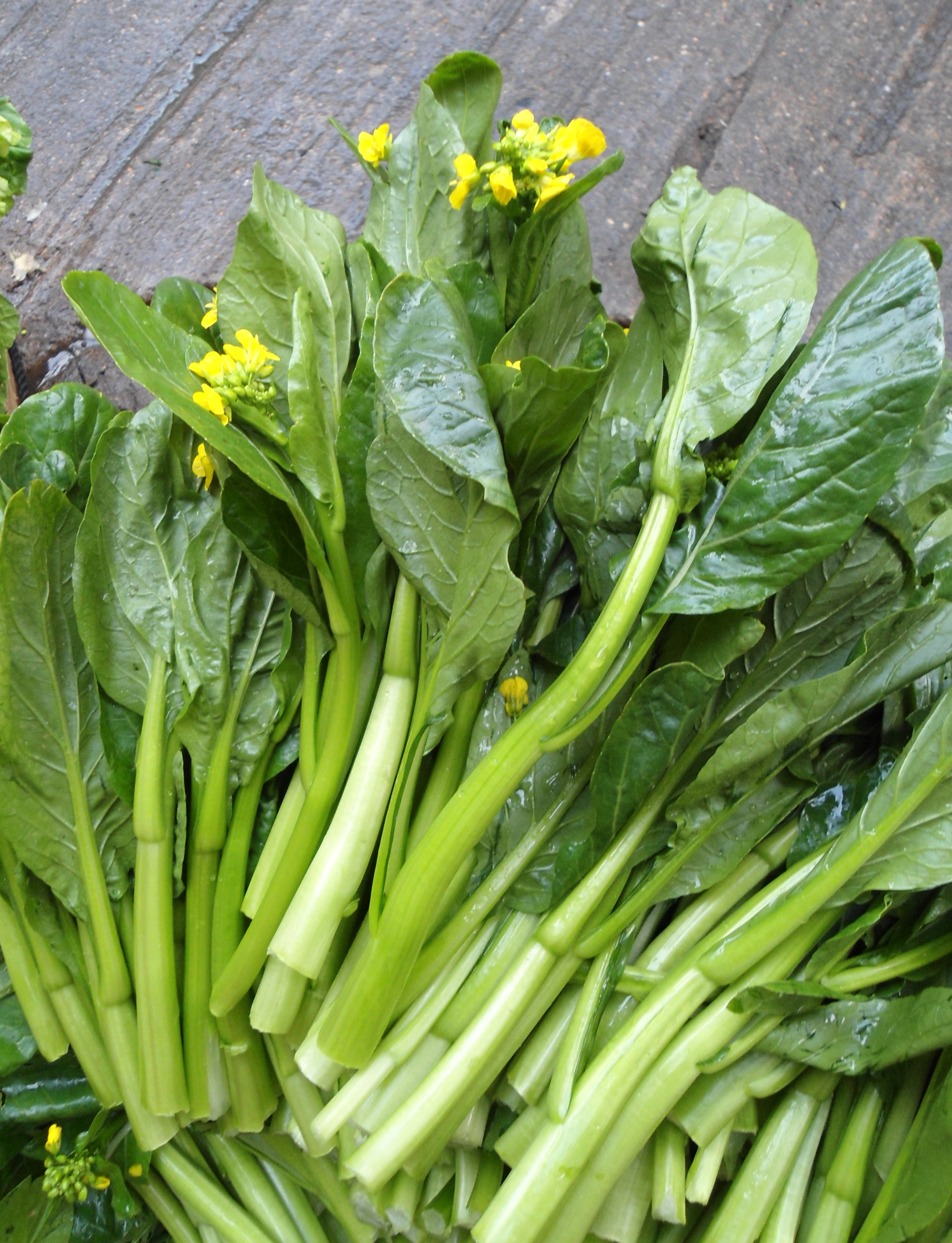
Typical choy sum fresh from field in Hainan

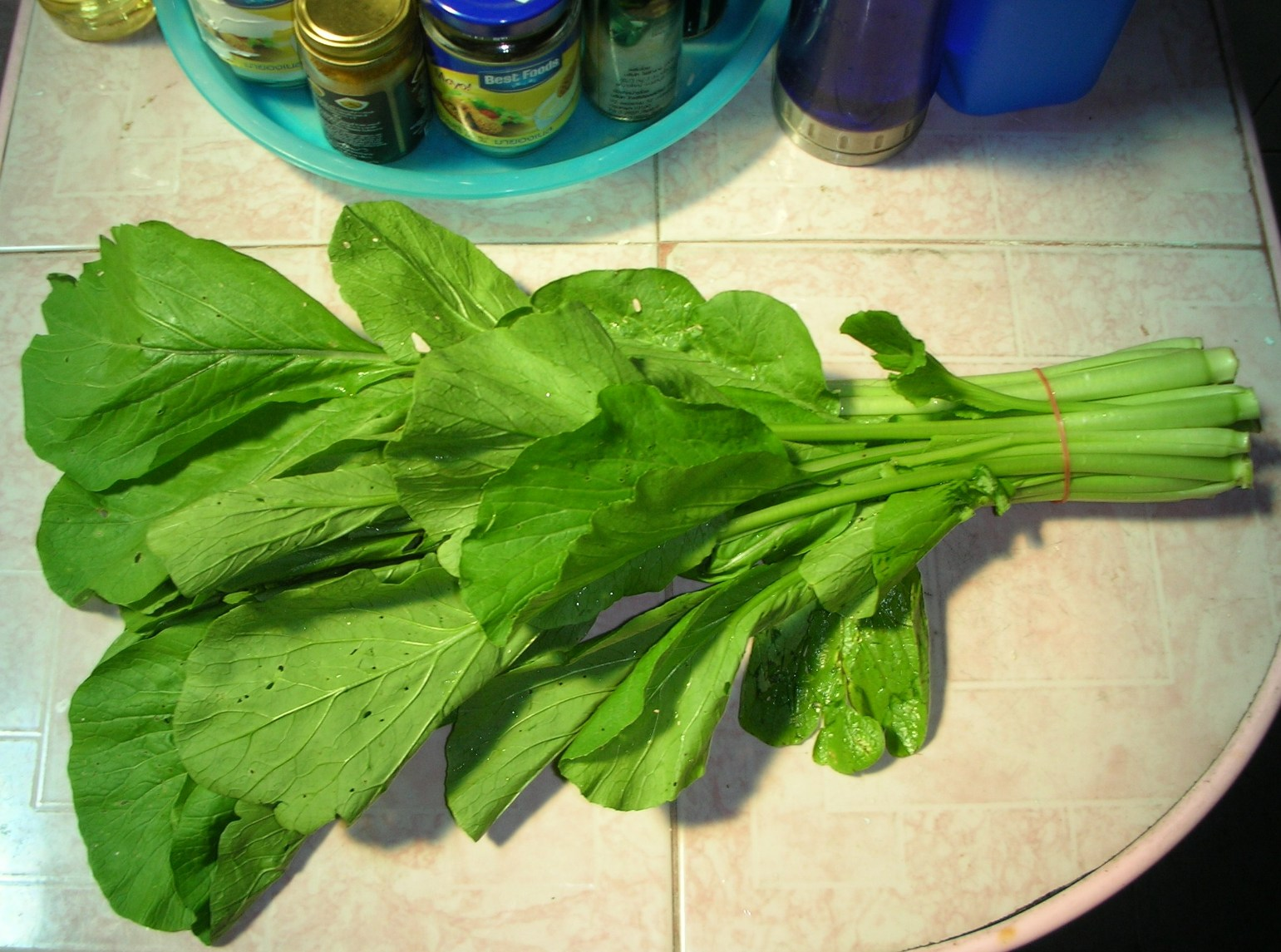
Choy sum variety in Thailand, called phàk Kwangtûng (lit: Cantonese cabbage; cabbage of Guangdong)

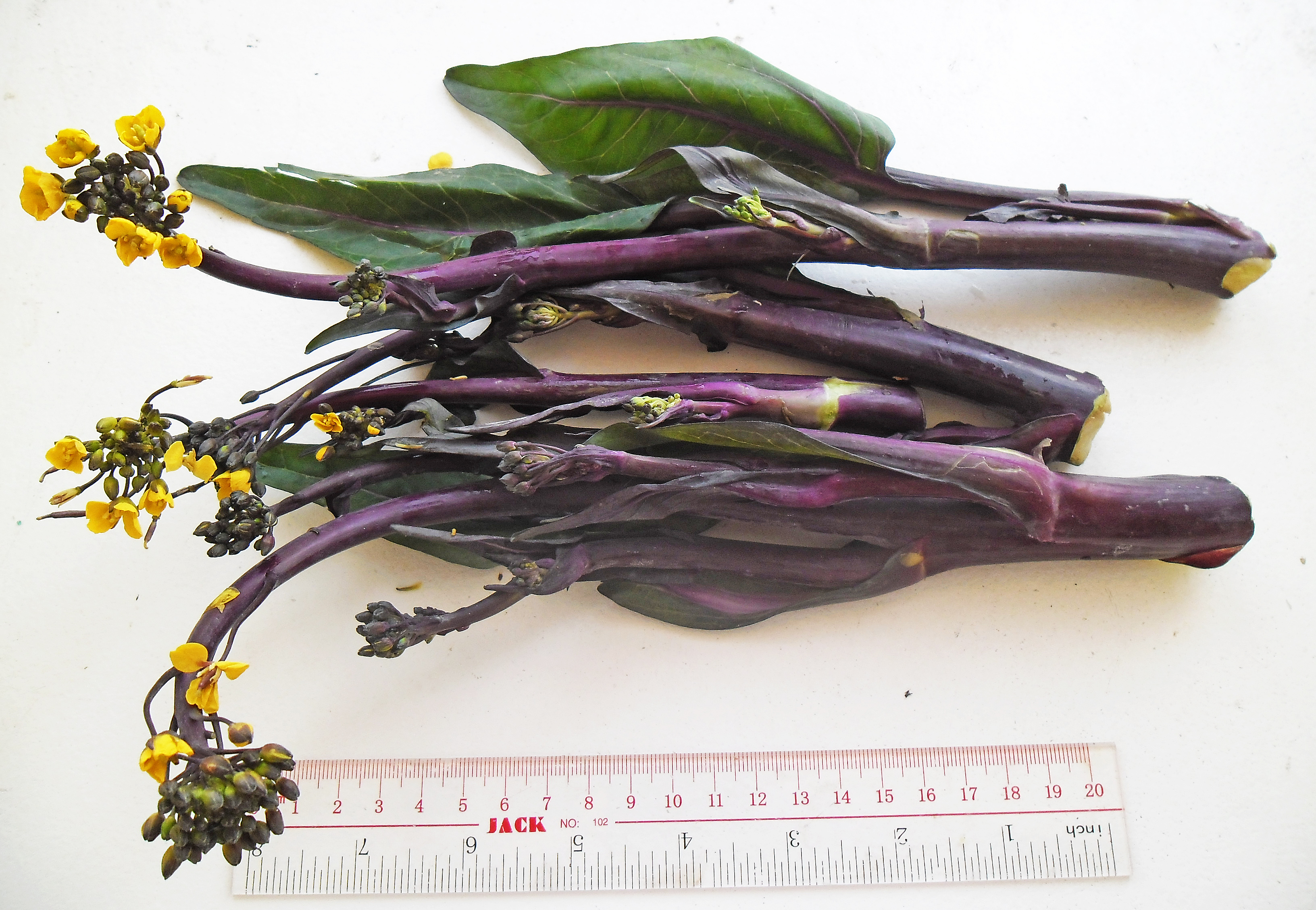
Purple choi sum, a choy sum variety in Hong Kong

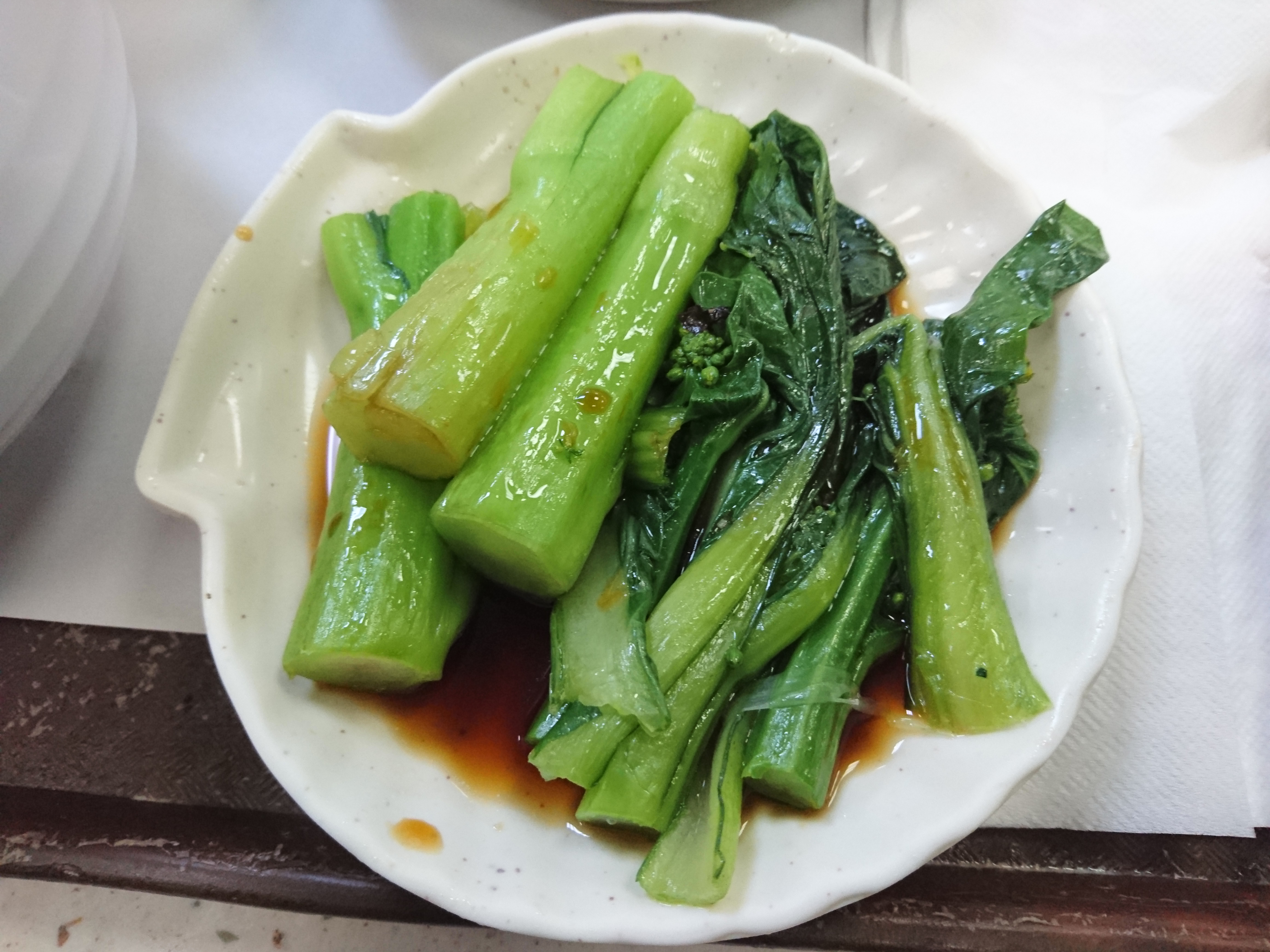
Cooked choy sum in soy sauce in Hong Kong

== See also ==
- List of leaf vegetables
- Bok choy
