= Pinaasakan sada =

Traditional simmered fish of Sabah, Malaysia

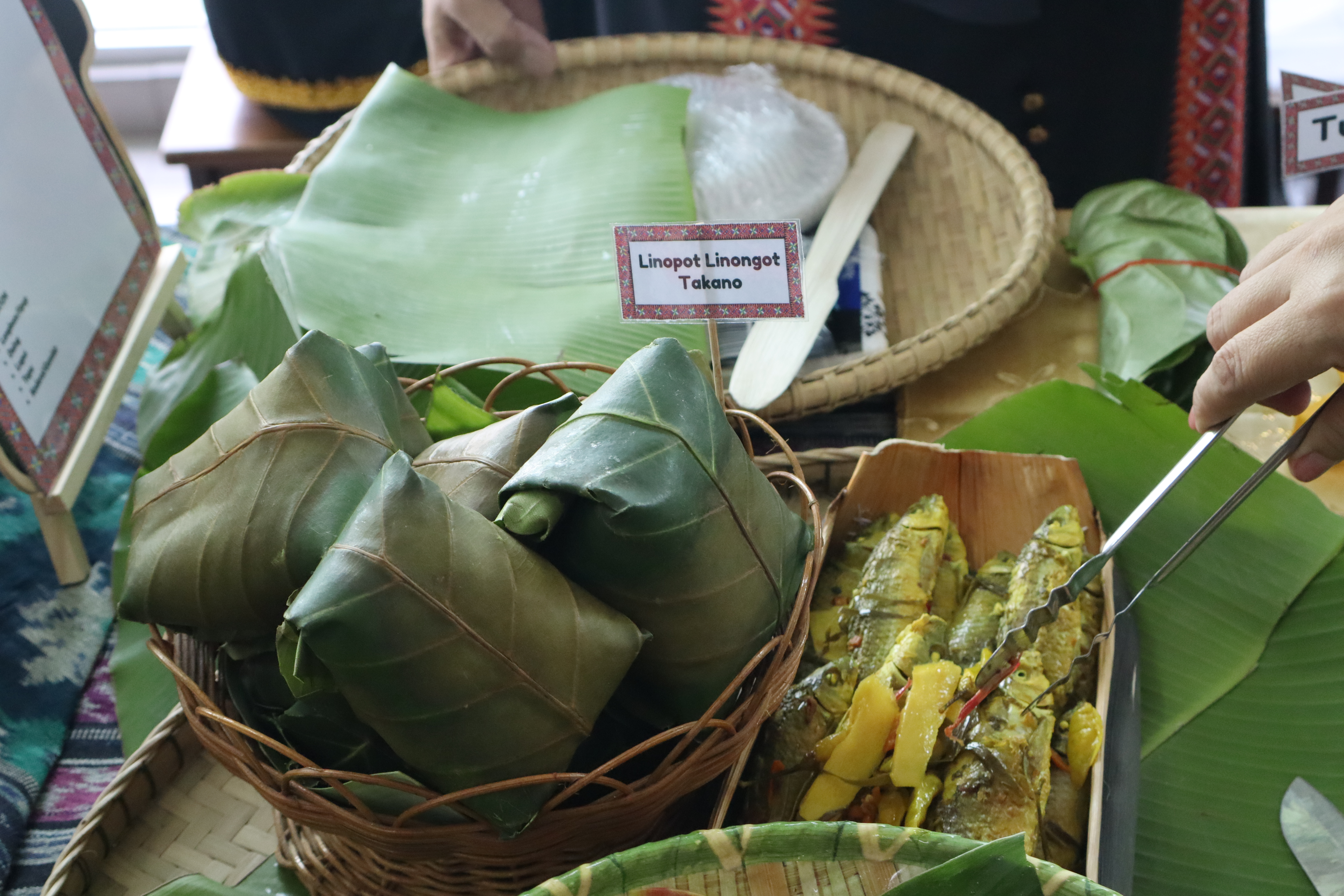
- Traditional foods exhibition in Sabah, Malaysia with linopot (left) and pinaasakan sada (right)
- Alternative names: ikan ampap, parasakan, pinarasak, pinasakan or pinarasakan
- Type: Simmered fish
- Course: Appetiser or side dish
- Place of origin: Malaysia
- Region or state: Sabah
- Associated cuisine: Sabahan cuisine
- Created by: Kadazan-Dusun
- Main ingredients: Basung fish (Mackerel scad) (common), tilapia, or puffer fish (rare), takob akob (Garcinia parvifolia), salt, and turmeric
- Ingredients generally used: Bambangan (Mangifera pajang wild mango), bilimbi (Averrhoa bilimbi), garlic, unripe mango, tamarind, ginger, lemongrass, and bird's eye chillies

Pinaasakan sada (or simply called pinasakan) is a type of traditional native preserved simmered fish dish of the indigenous Kadazan-Dusun people in the state of Sabah within East Malaysia. It is commonly made of mackerel scad fish marinated with takob akob fruit (Garcinia parvifolia), turmeric and with added salt, although puffer fish may also sometimes be used. Its soup is used to be paired with nantung (ambuyat), a starchy bland substance made of sago or with white fragrant rice as well as the linopot. This dish is a culinary heritage of Sabah's primary Dusunic indigenous community and is considered healthy due to the absence of oil in its preparation.

== Origin and background ==
The dish originated from the traditional methods employed by the indigenous Dusun people in the interior to prolong its shelf life by cooking fish with an ample quantity of salt and sour fruit as well to enhance its flavour so it can be stored throughout their daytime work in their gardens. This type of dish is easily found among the Dusuns in Ranau, Kota Marudu and Kota Belud districts. Some Dusun sub-ethnic groups from Ranau, especially in Kundasang and Bundu Tuhan, as well as those in the districts of Beluran and Sandakan, specifically call the dish "sada pinarasakan", with sada carrying the meaning of fish in Dusunic languages while pinasakan is a "soupy dish that is cooked until dry".

== Preparation ==
Basung (mackerel scad) is the most common fish prepared for the dish, boiled with takob akob (garcinia parvifolia) or bambangan (mangifera pajang). Other freshwater or sea fish can also be used as alternatives. The dish is cooked under low heat until most of its liquid reduces to a concentrated gravy. The tamarind, garlic, bilimbi (averrhoa bilimbi), unripe mango, ginger, lemongrass, and bird's eye chilies will all be mixed throughout the cooking process.

== See also ==
- List of fish dishes
- Hinava
- Pinais - similar cooking process in the Philippines
