= Tamu (marketplace) =

Traditional indigenous marketplace of northern Borneo

The Gaya Street Sunday Market in Kota Kinabalu District, one of the tamu in Sabah

Tamu or native markets is the traditional open-air marketplace held weekly in Sabah, Labuan and northern Sarawak of Malaysia and neighbouring Brunei that sells agricultural products and local produce by the indigenous natives. It is also known as a "farmers' market" or a "weekly market", which usually opens for one or two days depending on the respective districts. There are more than 50 tamu markets in 21 districts across the five divisions of Sabah with different operating days.

== Etymology ==
The word "tamu" (ms) (from təmu) carries the meaning of "to meet, receive or greet a guest" in the Proto-Malayo-Polynesian languages, which is a meeting place for villagers in the surrounding villages to sell village produce, meet friends and exchange stories (socialise). In the past, traders in tamu across North Borneo also practised the concept of an exchange in a barter system, although in the modern days the activities have been less frequent.

== Background and history ==
From left to right: Tamus of Tuaran in 1956 and Kota Belud in 1961, British North Borneo

The first tamu was started in Kiasai Village of Kota Belud District by the British North Borneo political agent and later Resident William Pretyman on 13 December 1878 through the joint communal activities (gotong royong) among the Dusun, Bajau and Iranun indigenous locals. Through the market, Dusun farmers will usually barter their rice to Bajau and Iranun fishermen, who would exchange it with their fish catch with merchants from both Brunei and China, also sourcing North Borneo's local products from the tamu. On 31 December 1884, Stair Elphinstone Dalrymple, the Assistant Resident of Keppel Province, noted that prior to the governance of the North Borneo Chartered Company (NBCC), the Putatan sub-district lacked a tamu, and by the end of the subsequent year, a tamu commenced at the Dusun village of Pagansakan every ten days, situated a few kilometres upstream from the Putatan River. Since then, the culture is further popularised in the 1900s throughout the region, especially when the NBCC wanted to gather the natives from various remote locations in the inner farlands to contribute to economic activities.

== Features ==
The tamu is considered Sabah's speciality since it is not only a weekly market but also an occasion where people socialise, trading both food and drinks and goods as well as sharing the latest news. From the indigenous perspective, the tamus also had important social and ritual functions. Within the traditional native market, various Sabah's signature products, such as bambangan, bosou, langkum, lihing, montoku, pinakol, sigup kirai, sinalau, siung, sompoton, tapai, and tuhau, among others, can be found. Under the Local Government Ordinance 1961, the sales and operating licence of tamus vendors is also being regulated by the local government of Sabah.

== Gallery ==
Kota Belud District

Sikuati, Kudat District

Sapulut, Nabawan District

Papar District

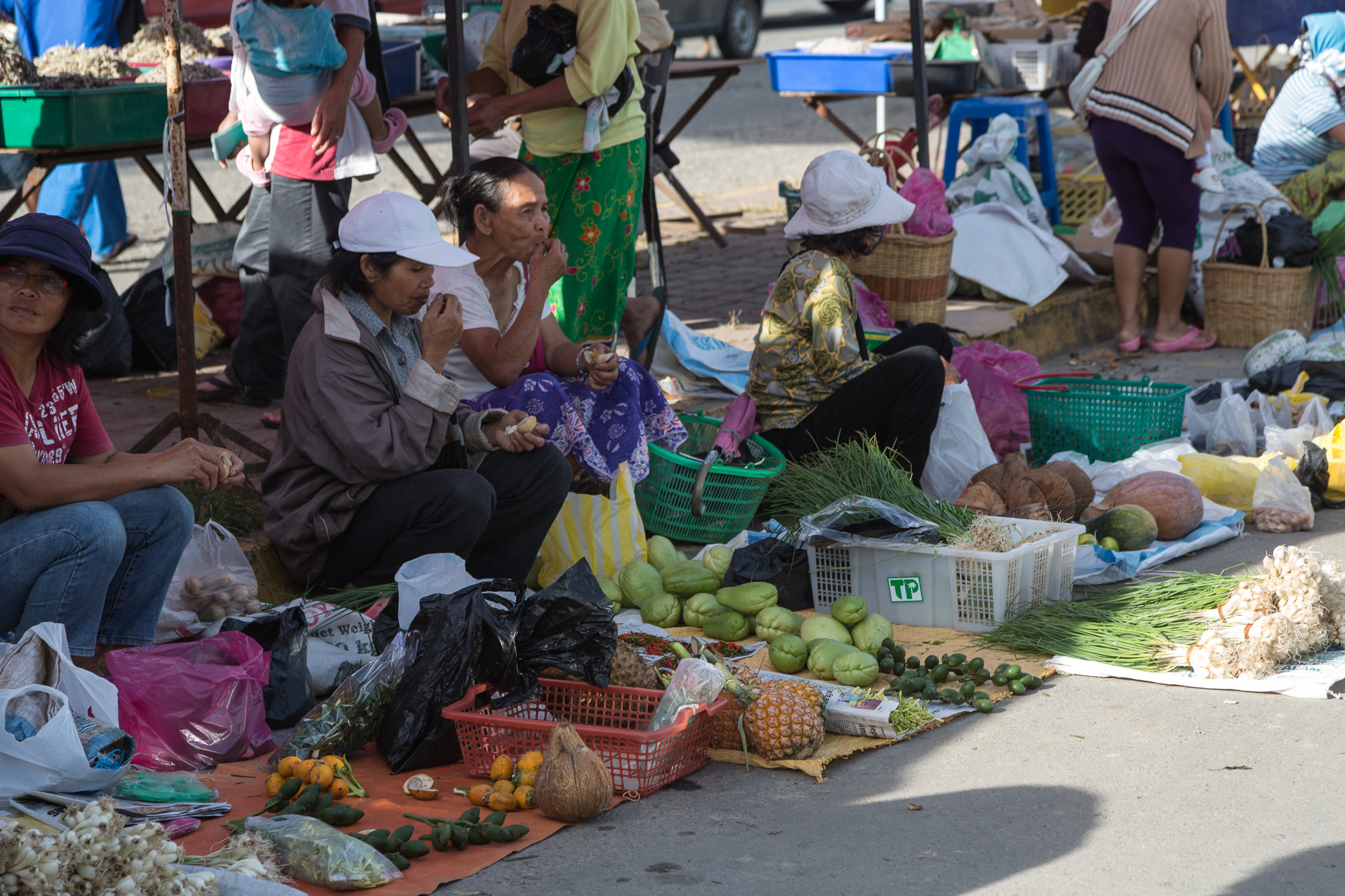
Nabalu, Ranau District

Telupid District

== See also ==
- Farmers' market – Market featuring foods sold directly by farmers to consumers
- Pasar malam – Night market found in Brunei, Indonesia, Malaysia and Singapore
- Pasar pagi – Traditional morning wet market in Malaysia and Indonesia
- Street food – Ready-to-eat food or drink on a street
- Street market – Market in a public outdoor place
