= Jeanne Calment =

Oldest verified person in history (1875–1997)

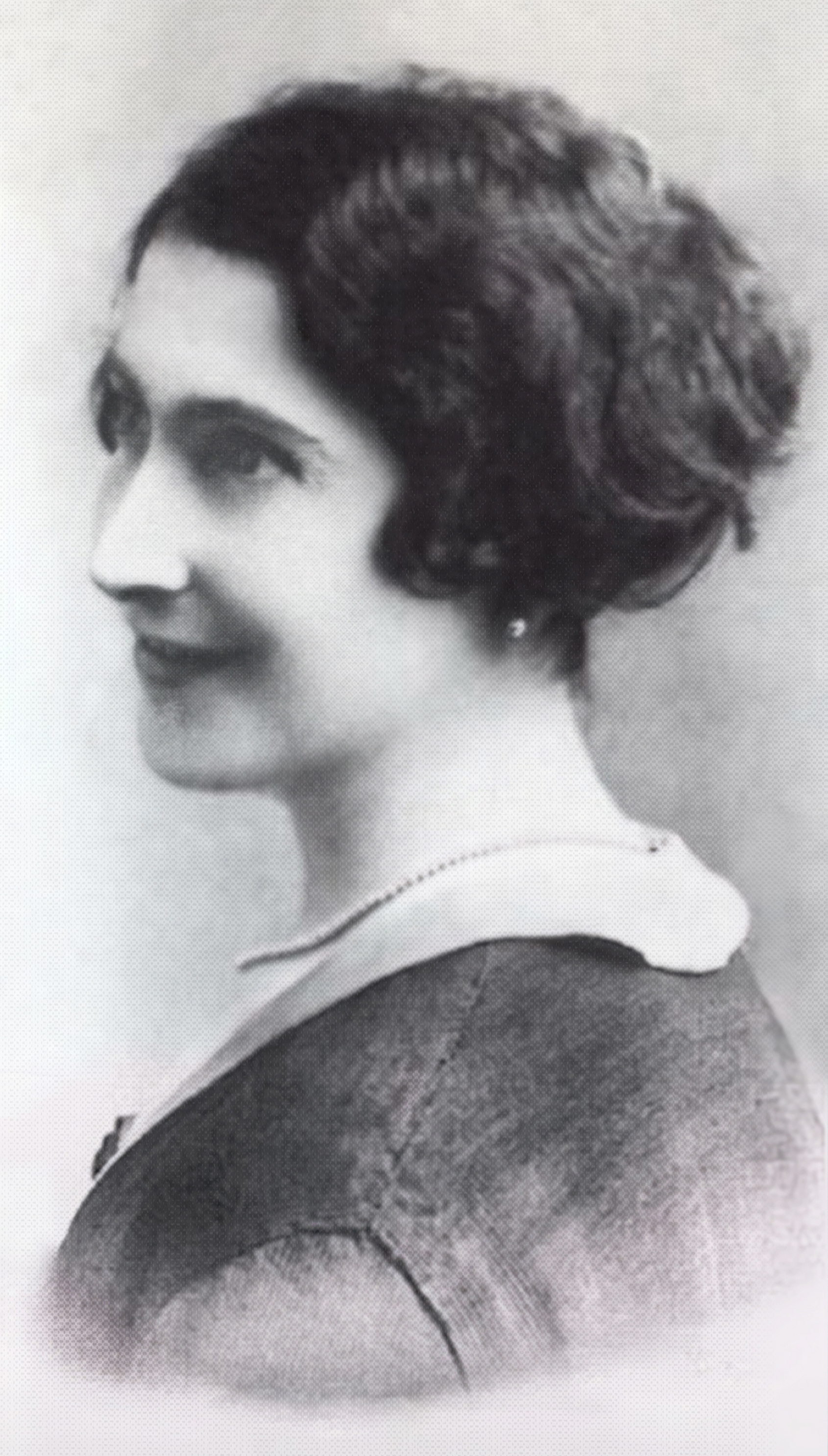
- Calment between 1900 and 1910
- Born: Jeanne Louise Calment; 21 February 1875; Arles, France
- Died: 4 August 1997 (aged 122 years, 164 days); Arles, France
- Burial place: Trinquetaille Cemetery, Arles, France
- Known for: Longest documented human lifespan – since 30 March 1991; Oldest verified living person (7 July 1990 – 4 August 1997)
- Spouse: Fernand Calment (m. 1896; died 1942)
- Children: 1

Jeanne Louise Calment (French: [ʒan lwiz kalmɑ̃]; 21 February 1875 – 4 August 1997) was a French supercentenarian who is the oldest person in recorded history whose age has been verified, with a documented lifespan of 122 years and 164 days. Her longevity attracted media attention and medical studies of her health and lifestyle. Calment is the only person in history who has been verified to have reached the age of 120 years.

According to census records, Calment outlived both her daughter and her grandson. In January 1988, she was widely reported to be the oldest living person in the world. In 1995, at age 120, she was declared to be the oldest person in history with a verified date of birth.

== Early life ==
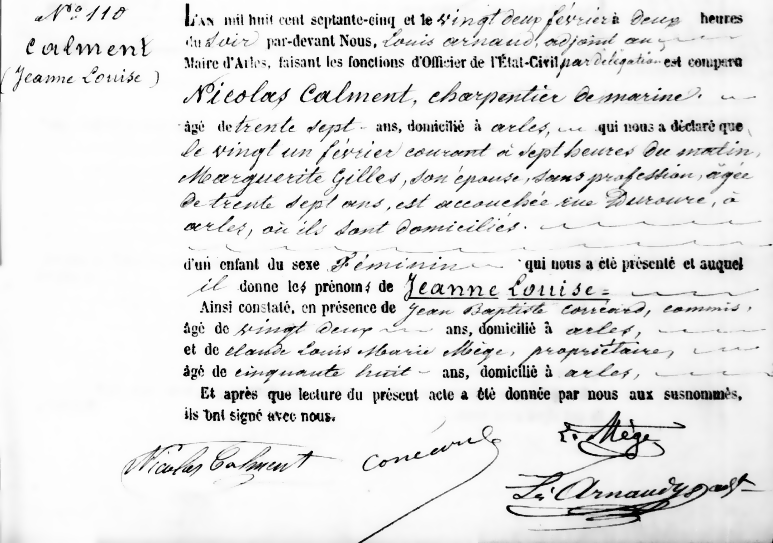
Birth certificate of Calment

Jeanne Louise Calment was born on 21 February 1875 in Arles, Bouches-du-Rhône, Provence. Some of her close family members also had above-average lifespans. Her older brother, François (1865–1962), lived to the age of 97; her father, Nicolas (1837–1931), who was a shipbuilder, lived to be 93 years of age; and her mother, Marguerite Gilles (1838–1924), who was from a family of millers, lived to be 86 years of age.

From age seven until her First Communion, Calment attended Mrs Benet's church primary school in Arles, and then the local collège (secondary school), finishing at 16 with the brevet classique diploma. Asked about her daily routine while at primary school, she replied that "when you are young, you get up at eight o'clock". In lieu of a solid breakfast, she would have either coffee with milk, or hot chocolate, and at noon her father would pick her up from school to have lunch at home before she returned to school for the afternoon. In the following years, she continued to live with her parents, awaiting marriage, painting, and improving her piano skills.

== Adult life ==
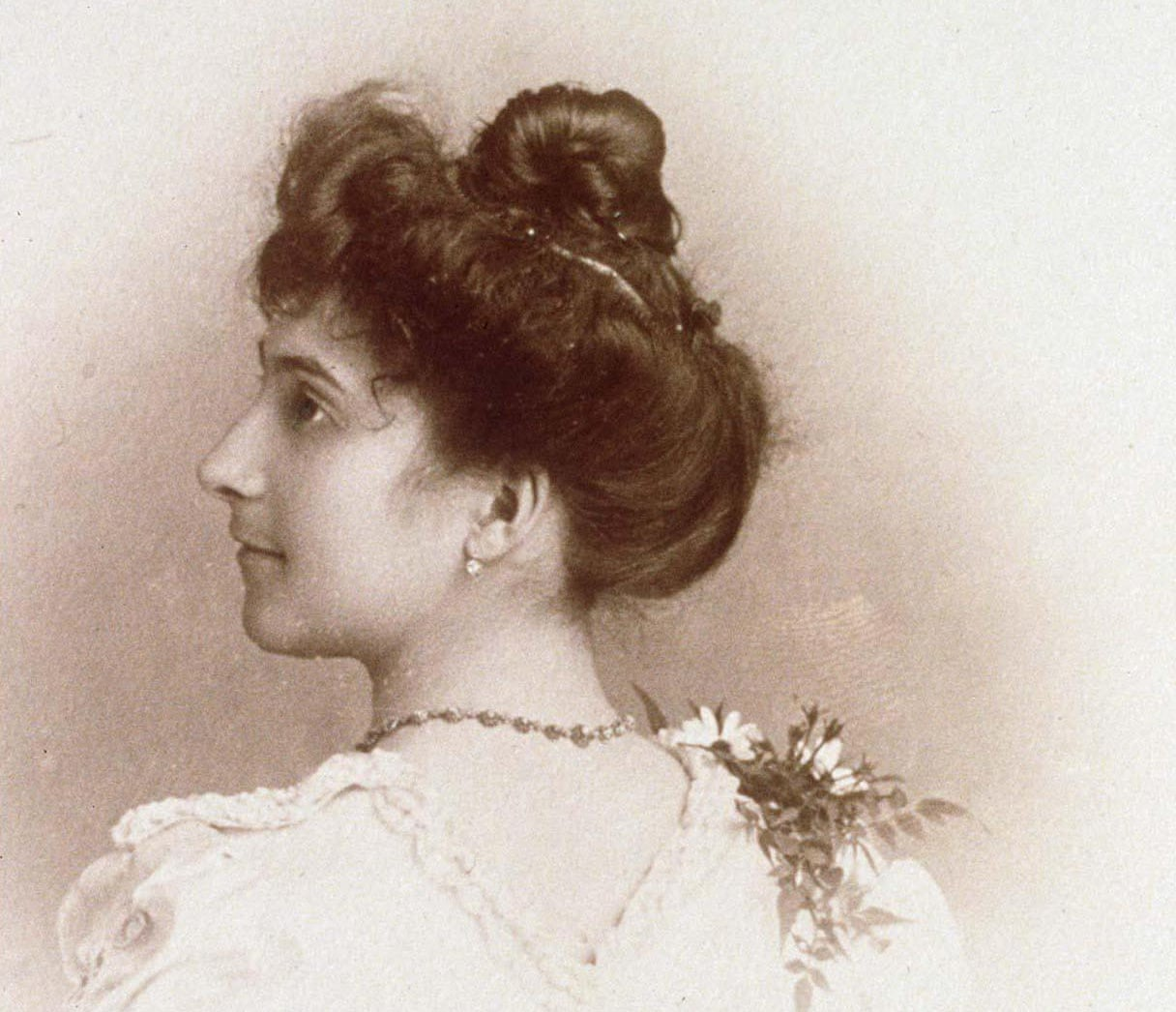
Calment at age 20 in 1895

On 8 April 1896, at the age of 21, Jeanne married her double second cousin, Fernand Nicolas Calment (1868–1942). Their paternal grandfathers were brothers, and their paternal grandmothers were sisters. He had reportedly started courting her when she was 15, but Jeanne was "too young to be interested in boys". Fernand was heir to a drapery business located in a classic Provençal-style building in the centre of Arles, and the couple moved into a spacious apartment above the family store. Jeanne employed servants and never had to work; she led a leisurely lifestyle within the upper society of Arles, pursuing hobbies such as fencing, cycling, tennis, swimming, rollerskating, playing the piano, and making music with friends. In the summer, the couple would stay at Uriage for mountaineering on the glacier. They also went hunting for rabbits and wild boars in the hills of Provence, using an "18mm rifle". Calment said she disliked shooting birds. She gave birth to her only child, a daughter named Yvonne Marie Nicolle Calment, on 19 January 1898. Yvonne married army officer Joseph Billot on 3 February 1926, and their only son, Frédéric, was born on 23 December of the same year. At the outbreak of World War I, Jeanne's husband Fernand, who was 46, was deemed too old to serve in the military.

Yvonne died of pleurisy on 19 January 1934, her 36th birthday, after which Calment raised Frédéric, although he lived with his father in the neighbouring apartment. World War II had little effect on Jeanne's life. She said that German soldiers slept in her rooms but "did not take anything away", so she bore no grudge against them. In 1942, her husband Fernand died, aged 73, reportedly of cherry poisoning. By the 1954 census, she was still registered in the same apartment, together with her son-in-law, retired Colonel Billot, Yvonne's widower; the census documents list Jeanne as "mother" in 1954 and "widow" in 1962. Her grandson Frédéric Billot lived next door with his wife Renée. Her brother François died in 1962, aged 97. Her son-in-law Joseph died in January 1963, and her grandson Frédéric died in an automobile accident in August of the same year.

In 1965, aged 90 and with no heirs left, Calment signed a life estate contract on her apartment with civil law notary André-François Raffray, selling the property in exchange for a right of occupancy and a monthly revenue of 2,500 francs (€380) until her death. Raffray died on 25 December 1995, by which time Calment had received more than double the apartment's value from him, and his family had to continue making payments. She commented on the situation by saying, "in life, one sometimes makes bad deals". In 1985, she moved into a nursing home, having lived on her own until the age of 110. A documentary film about her life, entitled Beyond 120 Years with Jeanne Calment, was released in 1995. In 1996, Time's Mistress, a four-track CD of Jeanne speaking over musical backing tracks in various styles, including rap, was released.

== Oldest documented human ==
=== Longevity records ===
In 1986, Calment became the oldest living person in France at the age of 111. Her profile increased during the centennial of Vincent van Gogh's move to Arles, which occurred from February 1888 to April 1889 when she was 13 and 14 years old. Calment claimed to reporters that she had met van Gogh at that time, introduced to him by her future husband in her uncle's fabric shop. She remembered that van Gogh gave her a condescending look, as if unimpressed by her. She described his personality as ugly, ungracious, and "very disagreeable", adding that he "reeked of alcohol". Calment said that she forgave van Gogh for his bad manners.

She was recognised by The Guinness Book of Records as the world's oldest living person in 1988, when she was 112. However, the Gerontology Research Group later validated the age of Easter Wiggins (1 June 1874 – 7 July 1990), meaning that in reality Calment became the world's oldest living person in 1990. At the age of 114, she briefly appeared in the 1990 fantasy film Vincent and Me, walking outside and answering questions.

Calment's status further increased when Guinness named her the oldest person ever on 17 October 1995. This was based on her surpassing the now-debunked age claim of Japanese man Shigechiyo Izumi. As a result of Izumi's validation being withdrawn, Calment had already been the oldest person ever since surpassing the age of Easter Wiggins on 30 March 1991. Far exceeding any other verified human lifespan, Calment is widely regarded as the best-documented supercentenarian recorded. For example, she was listed in fourteen census records, beginning in 1876 as a one-year-old infant. After Calment's death, at 122 years and 164 days, then almost 117-year-old Canadian woman Marie-Louise Meilleur became the oldest validated living person. Several claims to have surpassed Calment's age were made, but none have been verified. For about three decades, Calment has held the status of the oldest human being whose age has been validated by modern standards.

=== Age verification ===
In 1994, the city of Arles inquired about Calment's personal documents, in order to contribute to the city archives. However, reportedly on Calment's instructions, her documents and family photographs were selectively burned by a distant family member, Josette Bigonnet, a cousin of her grandson. The verification of her age began in 1995 when she turned 120, and was conducted over a full year. She was asked questions about documented details concerning relatives, and about people and places from her early life, for instance teachers or maids. A great deal of emphasis was put on a series of documents from population censuses, in which Calment was named from 1876 to 1975. The family's membership in the local Catholic bourgeoisie helped researchers find corroborating chains of documentary evidence. Calment's father had been a member of the city council, and her husband owned a large drapery and clothing business. The family lived in two apartments located in the same building as the store, one for Calment, her husband and his mother, one for their daughter Yvonne, her husband and their child. Several house servants were registered in the premises as well.

=== Popular media reports ===
Apocryphal media articles reported varying details, some of them unlikely. One report claimed that Calment recalled selling coloured pencils to Vincent van Gogh, reportedly remembering him later as "dirty, badly dressed and disagreeable", and seeing the Eiffel Tower being built. Another wrote that she started fencing in 1960, aged 85. Calment reportedly ascribed her longevity and relatively youthful appearance for her age to a diet rich in olive oil.

=== Controversy regarding age ===
Demographers have highlighted that Calment's age is an outlier, her lifespan being more than three years longer than the next oldest people ever documented, where the differences are usually by months or weeks. There have been various speculations about the authenticity of her age. In 2018, Russian gerontologist Valery Novoselov and mathematician Nikolay Zak revived the hypothesis that Jeanne died in 1934 and her daughter Yvonne, born in 1898, assumed her mother's official identity and was therefore 99 years old when she died in 1997. Around the same time, a series of related posts by gerontology blogger Yuri Deigin, titled "J'Accuse!", had gone viral on Medium. This hypothesis is considered weak by mainstream longevity experts, such as French gerontologist Jean-Marie Robine, who pointed out that during his research, Calment had correctly answered questions about things that her daughter could not have known first-hand. Robine also dismissed the idea that the residents of Arles could have been duped by the switch. Another doctor who had helped verify Calment's records said that the team had considered the identity-switch hypothesis while Calment was still alive because she looked younger than her daughter in photographs, but similar discrepancies in the rates of aging are commonly found in families with centenarian members.

After consulting several experts, The Washington Post wrote that "statistically improbable is not the same thing as statistically impossible", that Novoselov and Zak's claims have been dismissed by the overwhelming majority of experts, and that those claims are "lacking, if not outright deficient". In September 2019, several French scientists released a paper in The Journals of Gerontology pointing out inaccuracies in the Zak et al. paper.

The team presented evidence to support Calment's age – including multiple official documents, census data, and photographic evidence – and also argued that it was indeed statistically possible to reach Calment's age. The authors criticised the advocates of the identity switch hypothesis, and called for a retraction of Zak's article. In February 2020, Zak and Philip Gibbs published an assessment applying Bayes' theorem to the question of her authenticity, noting that, while being subjective, it gave "a 99.99% chance of an identity switch in the case of Mme Calment". François Robin-Champigneul and Robert Young commented on Zak's and Gibbs' findings, with Robin-Champigneul saying that it "appears to be in fact a subjective and nonrigorous analysis", and Young saying that "[i]gnoring the actual facts of the case and stringing together opinions in a 'Bayesian' analysis are to merely misuse a mathematical tool". Young is said to have found that "a very solid case that Jeanne was 122 years has already been made" but that biosampling was still needed to test "for biomarkers of extraordinary longevity". Robin-Champigneul stated that "the hypothesis of an identity swap with her daughter appears not even realistic given the context and the facts, and not supported by evidence".

Since Jeanne Calment had 16 distinct great-great-grandparents while her daughter Yvonne had only 12, geneticists have noted that the question of identity could easily be settled by a test for autozygous DNA if a blood or tissue sample were to be made available.

== Health and lifestyle ==
Calment's health presaged her later record. On television she stated "J'ai jamais été malade, jamais, jamais" (transl. I have never been ill, never, never). At age 20, incipient cataracts were discovered when she suffered a major episode of conjunctivitis. She married at 21, and her husband's wealth allowed her to live without working. All her life she took care of her skin with olive oil and a puff of powder. At an unspecified time in her youth, she had suffered from migraines. Her husband introduced her to smoking, offering cigarettes after meals, but she did not smoke outside these post-meal occasions. Calment continued smoking in her elderly years until she was 117. At "retirement age", she broke her ankle, but before that had never suffered any major injuries. She continued cycling until her hundredth birthday. Around age 100, she fractured her leg, but she recovered quickly and was able to walk again.

After her brother, her son-in-law, and her grandson died in 1962–63, Calment had no remaining family members. (Note: Her closest living relative was Gilberte Mery, the granddaughter of Calment's first cousin, which made the two women first cousins twice removed.) She lived on her own from age 88 until shortly before her 110th birthday, when she decided to move to a nursing home. Her move was precipitated by the winter of 1985 which froze the water pipes in her house (she never used heating in the winter) and caused frostbite to her hands.

=== Daily routine ===
After her admission to the Maison du Lac nursing home in January 1985, aged almost 110, Calment initially followed a highly ritualised daily routine. She requested to be awoken at 6:45 a.m., and started the day with a long prayer at her window, thanking God for being alive and for the beautiful day which was starting. She sometimes loudly asked the reason for her longevity and why she was the only one to be still alive in her family. Seated on her armchair, she did gymnastics wearing her stereo headset. Her exercises included flexing and stretching the hands, then the legs. Nurses noted that she moved faster than other residents who were 30 years younger. Her breakfast consisted of coffee with milk and rusks.

She washed herself unassisted with a flannel cloth rather than taking a shower, applying first soap, then olive oil and powder to her face. She washed her own glass and cutlery before proceeding to lunch. She enjoyed daube (braised beef), but was not keen on boiled fish. She had dessert with every meal, and said that given a choice, she would eat fried and spicy foods instead of the bland foods on the menu. She made herself daily fruit salads with bananas and oranges. She enjoyed chocolate, sometimes indulging in a kilogram (2.2 lb) per week. After the meal, she smoked a cigarette and drank a small amount of port wine. In the afternoon, she would take a nap for two hours in her armchair, and then visit her neighbours in the care home, telling them about the latest news she had heard on the radio. At nightfall, she would dine quickly, return to her room, listen to music (her poor eyesight preventing her from enjoying her crosswords pastime), smoke a last cigarette and go to bed at 10:00 p.m. On Sundays, she went to Mass, and on Fridays she went to Vespers. She regularly prayed to and sought help from God and wondered about the afterlife.

=== Medical follow-up ===
Medical student Georges Garoyan published a thesis on Calment when she was 114 years old in January 1990. The first part records her daily routine (as presented above), and the second presents her medical history. She stated that she had been vaccinated as a child but could not remember which vaccine(s). Apart from aspirin against migraines, she had never taken any medicine, not even herbal teas. She did not contract chickenpox, rubella, or urinary infections, and was not prone to hypertension or diabetes. In April 1986, aged 111, she was sent to a hospital for heart failure and treated with digoxin. Later, she suffered from arthropathy in the ankles, elbows, and wrists, which was successfully treated with anti-inflammatory medication. Her arterial blood pressure was 140mm/70mm, her pulse 84/min. Her height was 150 cm (4 ft 11 in), and her weight 45 kg (99 lb), showing little variation from previous years. She scored well on mental tests, except on numeric tasks and recall of recent events. Analyses of her blood samples were in normal ranges between ages 111–114, with no signs of dehydration, anemia, chronic infection or kidney failure. Genetic analysis of the human leukocyte antigen system revealed the presence of the DR1 allele, common among centenarians. A cardiological assessment revealed a moderate left ventricular hypertrophy with a mild left atrial dilatation and premature heart beat. Radiology revealed diffuse osteoporosis, as well as incipient osteoarthritis in the right hip. An ultrasound exam showed no anomalies of internal organs. At this stage, Calment was still in good health, and continued to walk without a cane. She fell in January 1990 (aged almost 115) and fractured her femur, which required surgery. Subsequently, Calment used a wheelchair, and she abandoned her daily routine.

At the age of 115, Calment attracted the attention of researchers Jean-Marie Robine and Michel Allard, who collaborated with her attending doctor, Victor Lèbre, to interview her, verify her age and identify factors promoting her longevity. According to their year-long analysis, Calment's vision was severely impaired by bilateral cataracts, yet she refused to undergo a routine operation to restore her eyesight; she had a moderately weak heart, a chronic cough, and bouts of rheumatism. On the other hand, her digestion was always good, she slept well, and did not have incontinence. During the last years, she was 137 cm (4 ft 6 in) tall, and weighed 40 kg (88 lb); she confirmed that she had always been small, and had lost weight in recent years. Her eyes were light grey, and her white hair had once been chestnut brown.

At the age of 118, she was submitted to repeated neuropsychological tests and a CT scan. The tests showed that her verbal memory and language fluency were comparable to those of persons with the same level of education in their eighties and nineties. Frontal lobe functions were relatively spared from deterioration, and there was no evidence of progressive neurological disorder, depressive symptoms or other functional illness. Her cognitive functioning was observed to improve slightly over the six-month period. Calment reportedly remained "mentally sharp" until the end of her life.

== Death ==
Calment died on 4 August 1997 in a nursing home in Arles, France. She was 122 years and 164 days old. French media reported that she died of natural causes, though some English-language obituaries did not specify a cause of death. The New York Times quoted demographer Jean-Marie Robine as stating that she had been in good health, albeit almost blind and deaf, as little as a month before her death. At the time of her death, she was also the last verified living person born in the 1870s.

== See also ==
- Jiroemon Kimura (1897–2013), the oldest man whose age was verified
- List of French supercentenarians
- Maximum life span
