= Tuhau =

Traditional condiment of Sabah, Malaysia

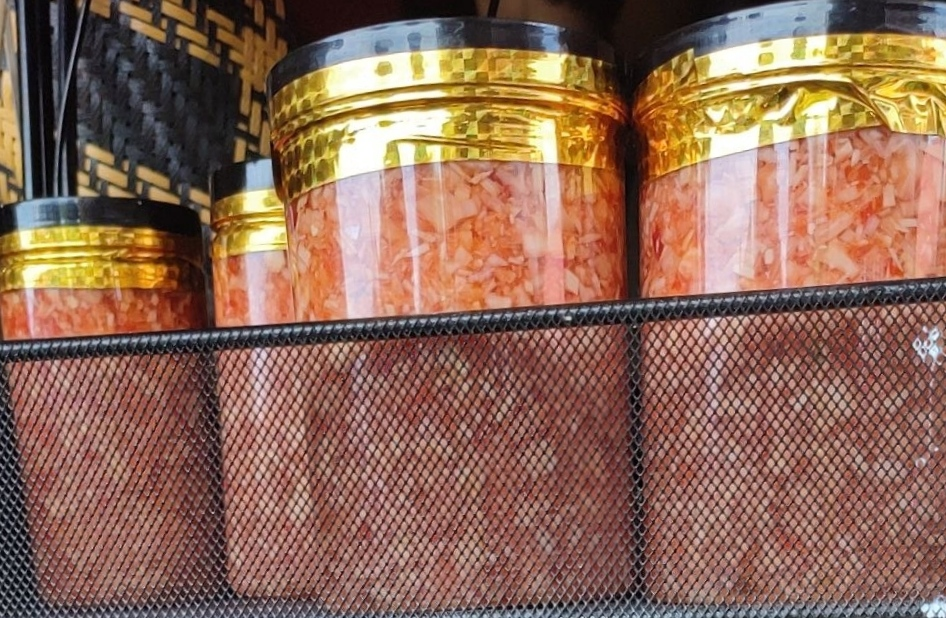
- Tuhau condiment sold in a sealed plastic jar at the Kadazan Dusun Cultural Association (KDCA) market of Penampang District, Sabah, Malaysia
- Type: Condiment and relish
- Course: Appetiser
- Place of origin: Malaysia
- Region or state: Sabah
- Associated cuisine: Sabahan cuisine
- Created by: Kadazan-Dusun and Murut
- Main ingredients: Etlingera coccinea (Bornean wild ginger), chillies, garlic, and salt with lime juice or vinegar
- Variations: tuhau sambal, tuhau serunding
- Food energy (per serving): 4 kcal (17 kJ)

Tuhau is a traditional native condiment/relish of the Kadazan-Dusun and Murut people in the state of Sabah within East Malaysia. It is made of wild ginger from the species of Etlingera coccinea, one of the household heritages among Sabah's main Dusunic indigenous community, with origins from rural Sabah to its current presence in the markets and kitchens across the country of Malaysia.

It is typically consumed as a sambal on its own or with fish, where it is available all year long in local "tamu" markets and can be served in its pickled state, which enhances its tart or savoury flavour, and is typically served with white rice. It is among the food items gazetted in a "Declaration of Heritage Object", gazetted heritage foods of Malaysia in 2024.

== Origin and background ==
It originates from the wild ginger plant species of Etlingera coccinea located within the lush tropical jungles of Borneo, usually grows abundantly in damp and dim areas, it can be seen thriving in sheltered areas, riverbanks and lowlands, which is heavily tied to the Dusun indigenous communities in the interior, especially those in Keningau, Ranau, and Tambunan; the plant is also found abundant within the Murut's region of Nabawan and Tenom.

The tuhau plant was initially used by the interior community as an alternative food source or their side dish during difficult times or when they were away from home hunting and exploring in the jungle. Over time, the inner part of the young tuhau stem began to be processed and its recipes diversified until it became an iconic appetiser dish and was recognised as one of the country's heritage foods. Two other tuhau plant derivative products aside from the main condiment are available, in the form of serunding (tuhau floss) or tuhau-based sauce.

== Preparation ==
The wild ginger shoots are washed, and the tough, woody, and fibrous outer layers need to be discarded and peeled away until the soft, pale, and pinkish-white interior is reached; it is then chopped and mixed with diced garlic, chillies, and salt with lime juice or vinegar as a substitute for acidity, which subsequently gives both a tart and a savoury taste. The mixture will then be tossed well to ensure the salt is dissolved, and the condiment is left to sit for at least 30 minutes to allow the flavours to develop and infuse. It is often paired with another traditional Sabah dish of pinasakan, a fish-based dish.

== Health benefits ==
A study from the University of Malaysia Sabah (UMS) found that the tuhau plant that was used in the making of the condiment has the potential to provide antioxidant benefits to the body. Enriched with potassium and vitamin B1, it has been traditionally used by the indigenous community in treating various diseases such as stomach aches and gastritis, as well as a laxative for constipation and flatulence, including blood detoxification and stabilising blood pressure.

== Gallery ==
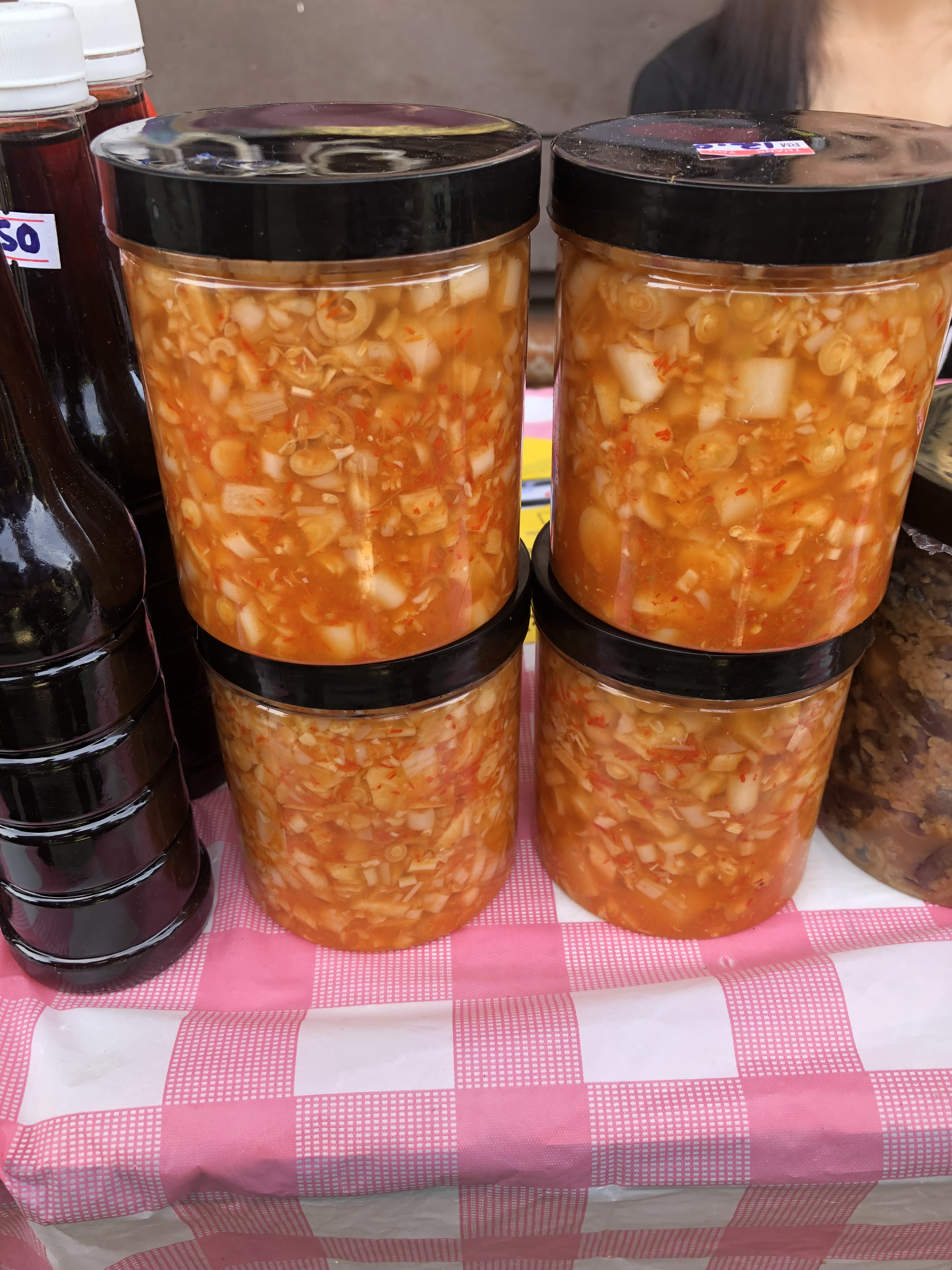
Another tuhau sambal in a sealed jar, commonly found around tamu (weekly market) within Sabah

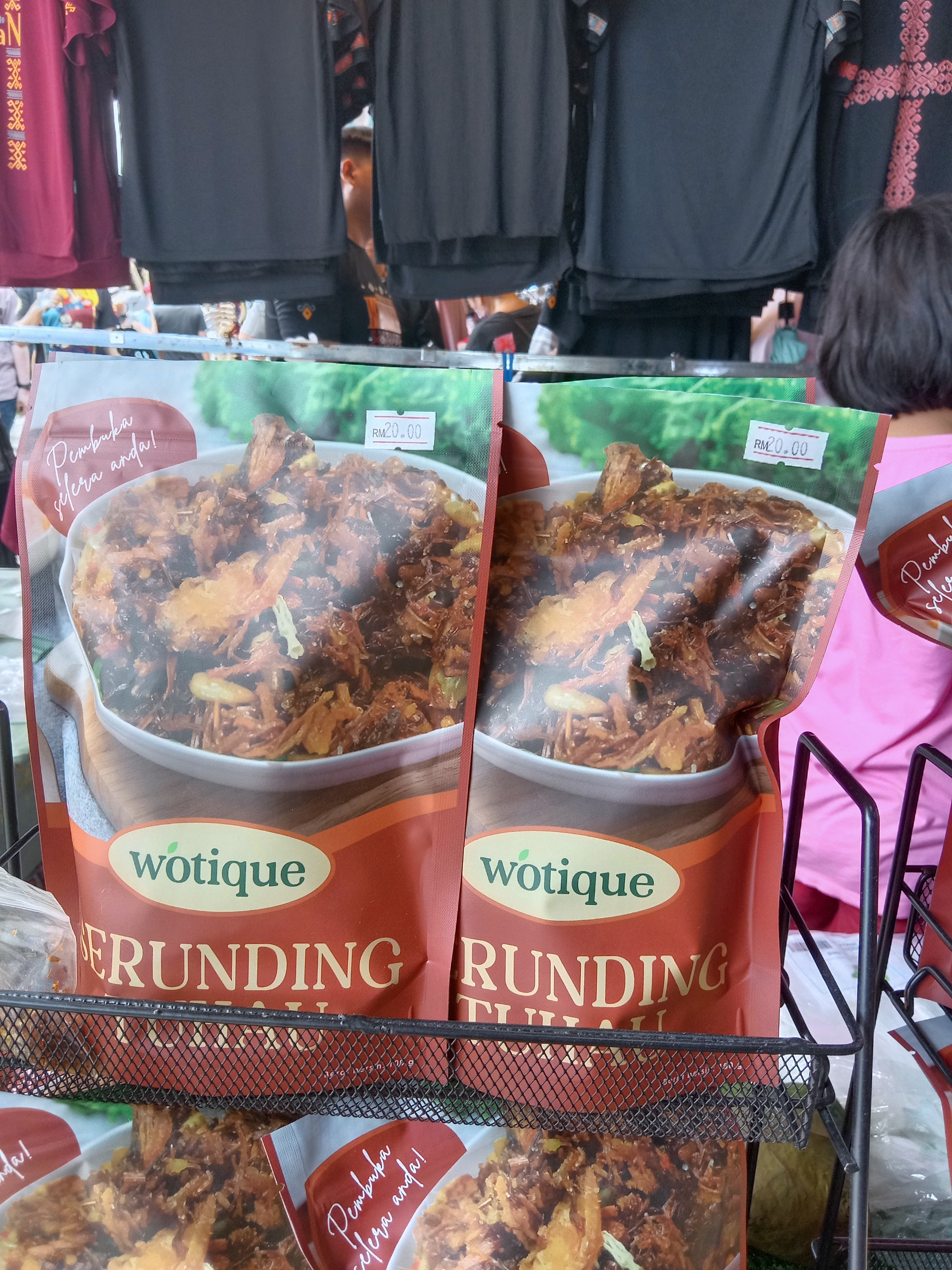
A commercially packed tuhau serunding, a serunding derived from the plant

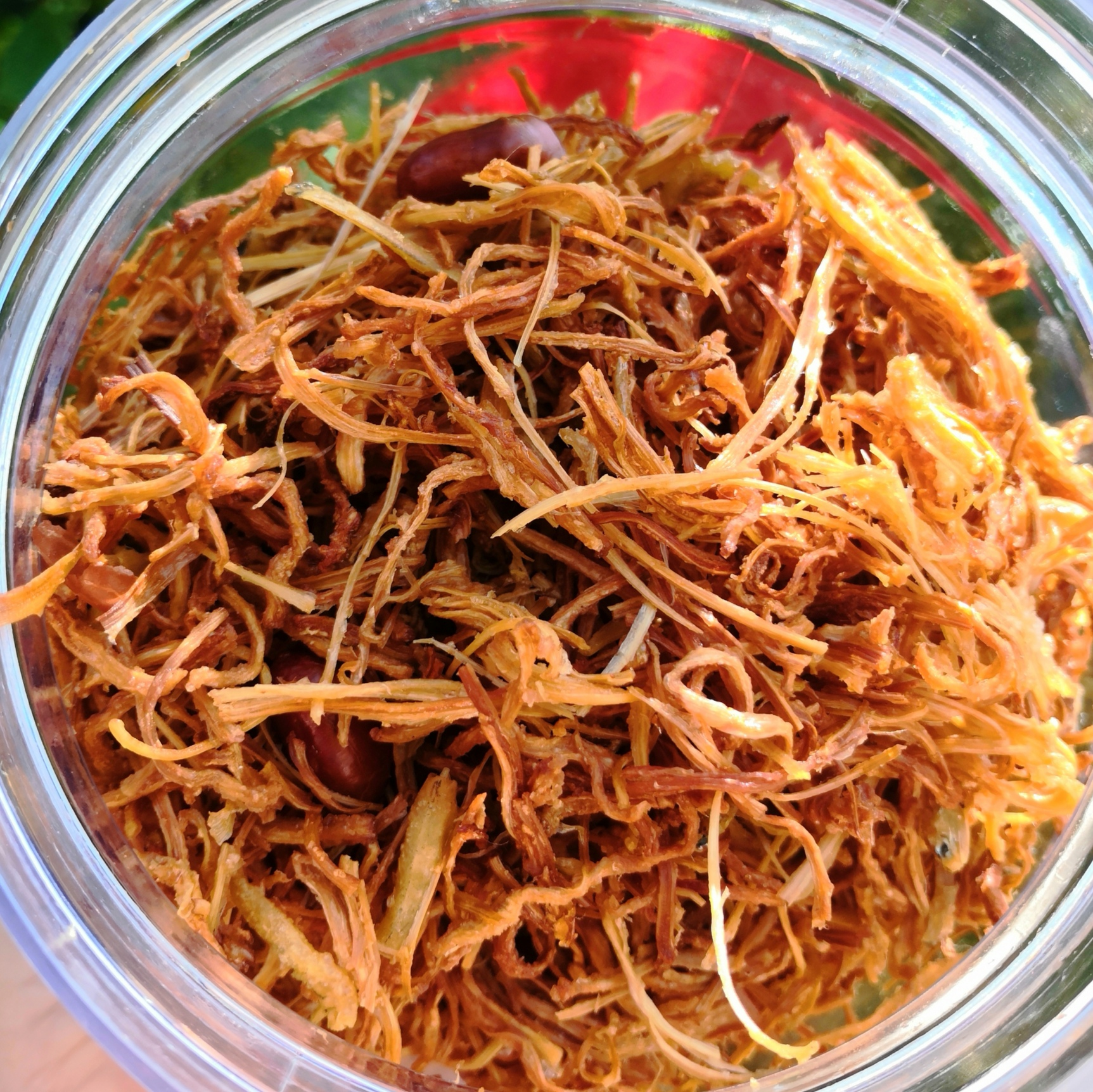
A closeup of tuhau serunding

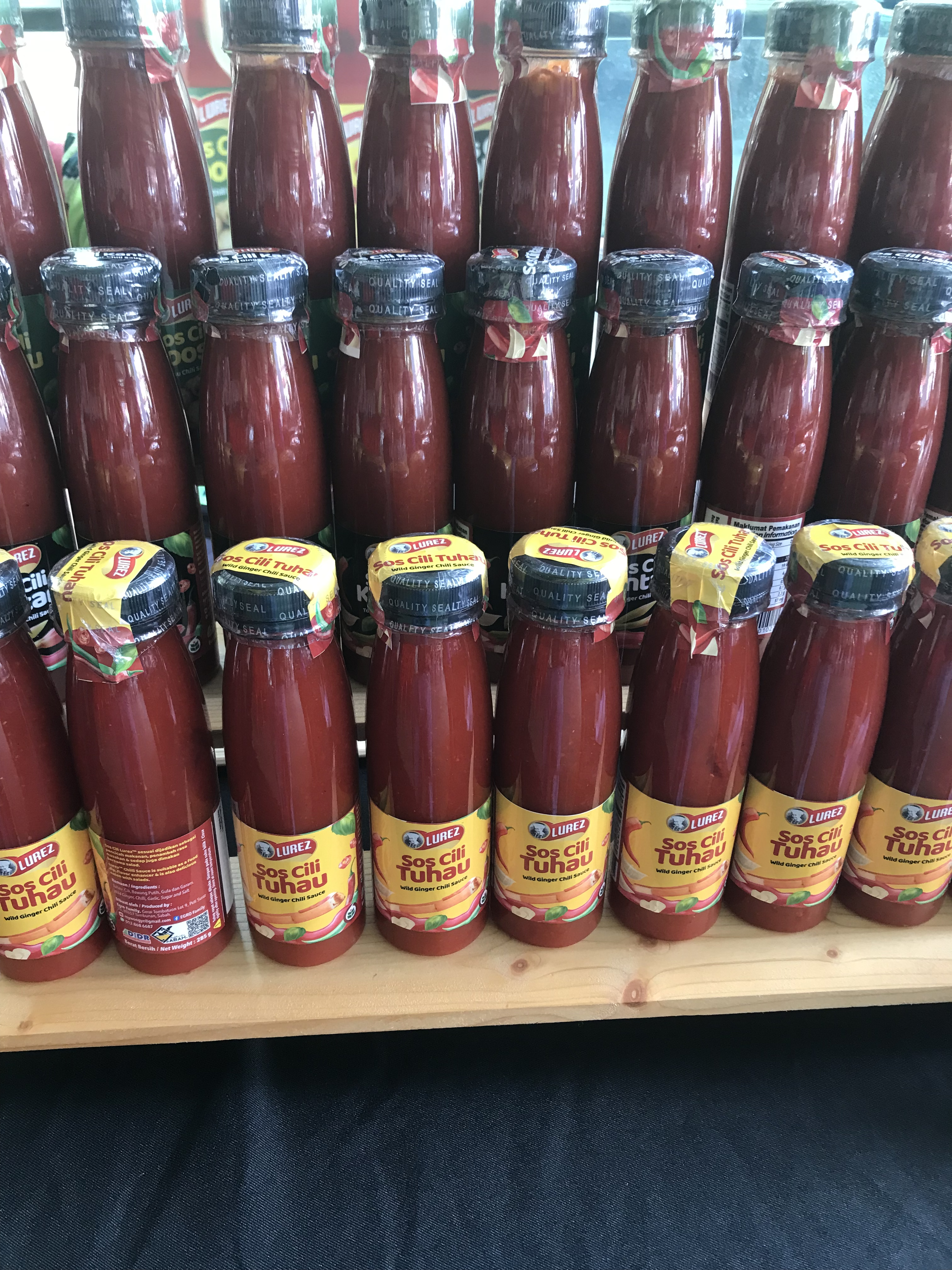
Tuhau chilli sauce, another version derived from the plant

== See also ==
- List of condiments
- Bambangan
- Bosou
