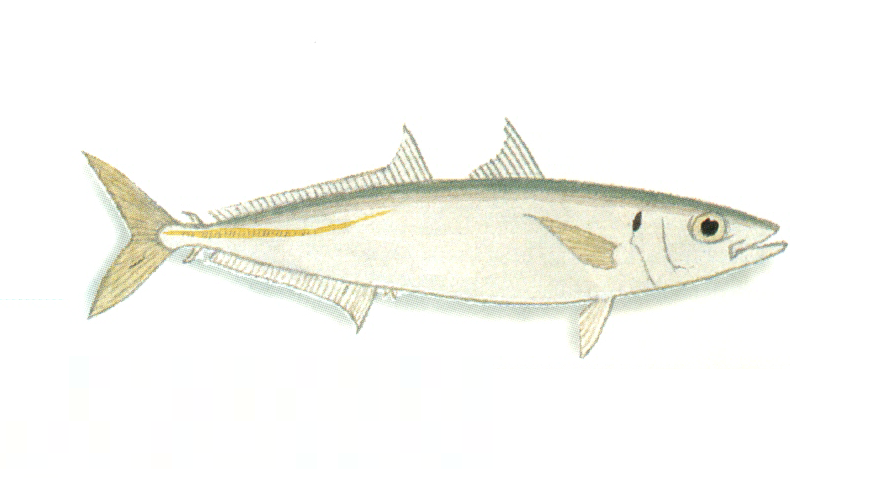
- Illustration
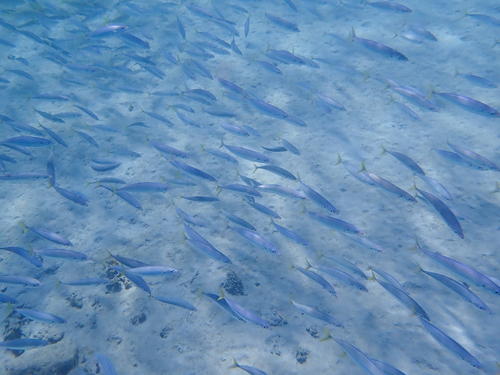
- Live individuals

Conservation status
- Least Concern (IUCN 3.1)

Scientific classification
- Kingdom: Animalia
- Phylum: Chordata
- Class: Actinopterygii
- Division: Teleostei
- Order: Carangiformes
- Suborder: Carangoidei
- Family: Carangidae
- Genus: Decapterus
- Species: D. macarellus

Binomial name
- Decapterus macarellus (G. Cuvier, 1833)

Synonyms
- Caranx macarellus Cuvier, 1833; Caranx jacobaeus Cuvier, 1833; Caranx pinnulatus Eydoux & Souleyet, 1850; Decapterus pinnulatus (Eydoux & Souleyet, 1850); Decapterus canonoides Jenkins, 1903

= Mackerel scad =

Species of fish

The mackerel scad (Decapterus macarellus), or speedo, is a species of fish of the family, Carangidae. While it can be considered gamefish, it is usually used as bait. It is popular for consumption in Hawaiʻi, the Philippines and the U.A.E. In Hawaiʻi, mackerel scad are called ʻopelu. In the Philippines they are called galunggong.

== Description ==
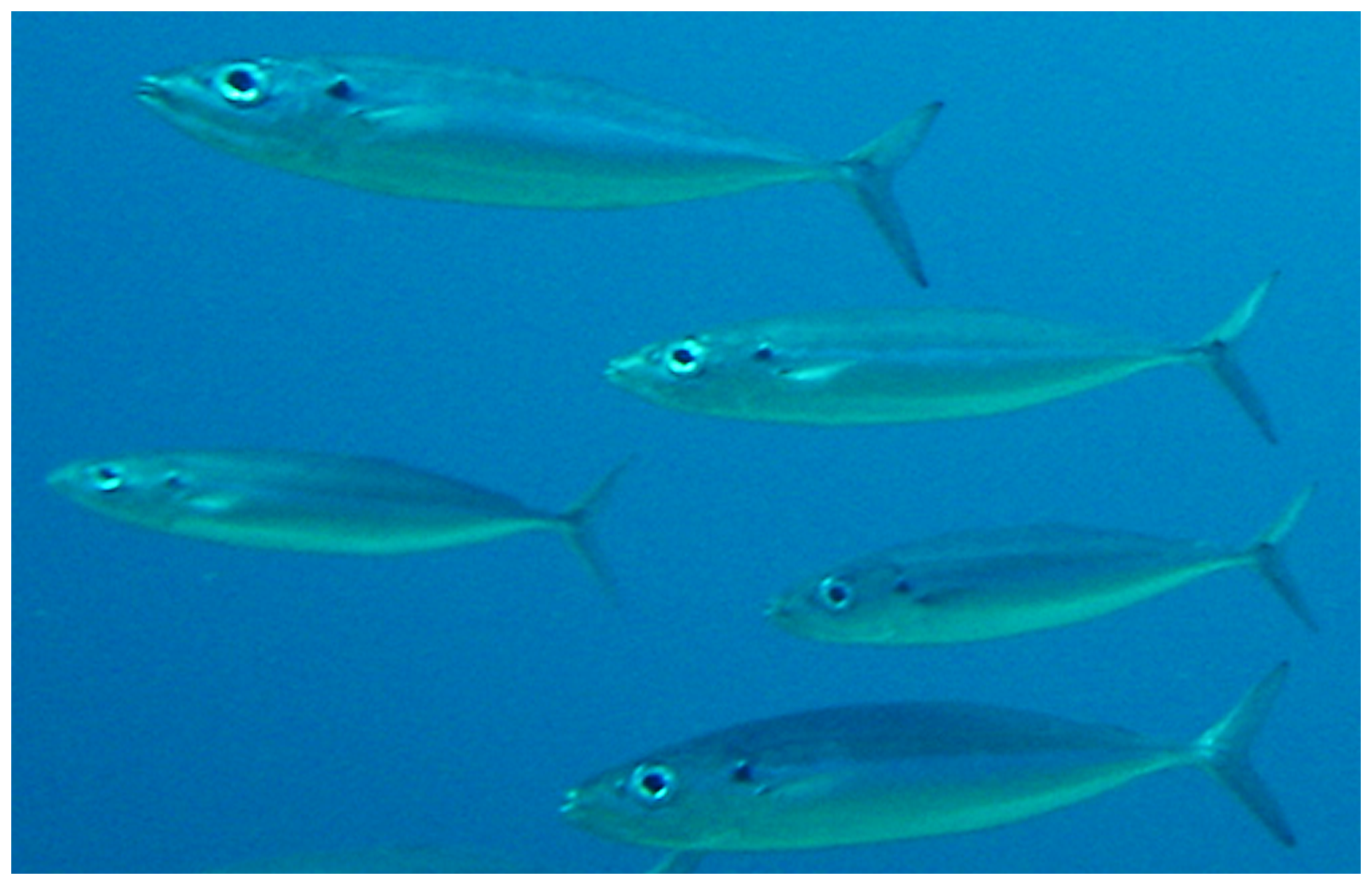
Shoaling mackerel scad near the Saba Bank.

The largest mackerel scad recorded was 46 cm long. Their elongated bodies look somewhat circular when viewed head on. They are distinguishable by a small, detached fin, located between the dorsal and caudal fins. Mackerel scad have 9 spines and 31–36 rays on their dorsal fins, while there are seven spines and 27–30 rays on their anal fins.

The mackerel scad's fins are black metallic to blue-green and its belly is white. The edge of the operculum has a small, black spot, with no spots on the lateral line. Mackerel scad's caudal fins have been described as reddish to yellow-green.

== Distribution and habitat ==
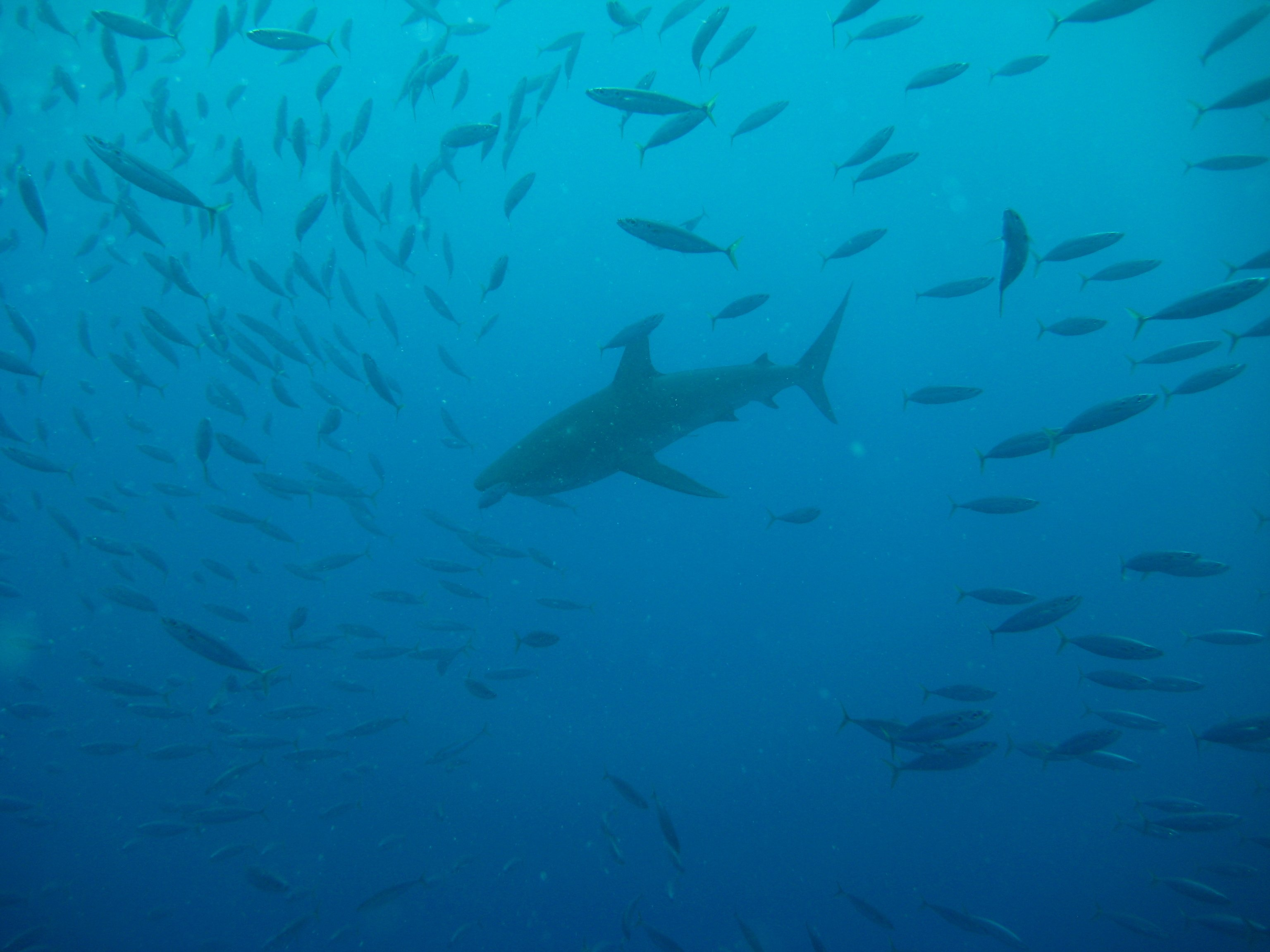
Shoaling mackerel scad avoiding a shark, north of Oahu, Hawaii.

The mackerel scad's range covers most of the world's oceans. In the western Atlantic, they have been found off Nova Scotia and Bermuda, south to Rio de Janeiro, although they do not seem common in the Gulf of Mexico. In the eastern Atlantic, mackerel scad have been found off St. Helena, Ascension Island, and Cape Verde. They have also been recorded in the Gulf of Guinea, The Azores, and Madeira. In the Indian Ocean, mackerel scad have been found in the Red Sea and the Gulf of Aden they are also known from South Africa, the Mascarenes, the Seychelles, and Sri Lanka. In the eastern Pacific, they are known from the Revillagigedo Islands, the Gulf of California, and the coast of Ecuador.

FAO areas where the mackerel scad is native include the north east and northwest Atlantic, the center east and west Atlantic, the Mediterranean and the Black Sea, the South east and west Atlantic, the eastern and western Indian, and the North west, center west, center east and south west Pacific.

Mackerel scad usually live in subtropical seas at depths up to 400 m. They prefer clear water, and are frequently found around islands. Although mackerel scad have been found at the surface, they are usually caught at depths between 40 and 200 meters. They feed mainly on zooplankton.

== Economic significance ==
Mackerel scad are fairly important both to fisheries and to sportfishing. They are a somewhat popular fish for human consumption, normally eaten split and fried, but are more often used as bait, since large gamefish such as the blue-spotted grouper, giant trevally, and the onespot snapper are all known to feed on them.

=== As food ===
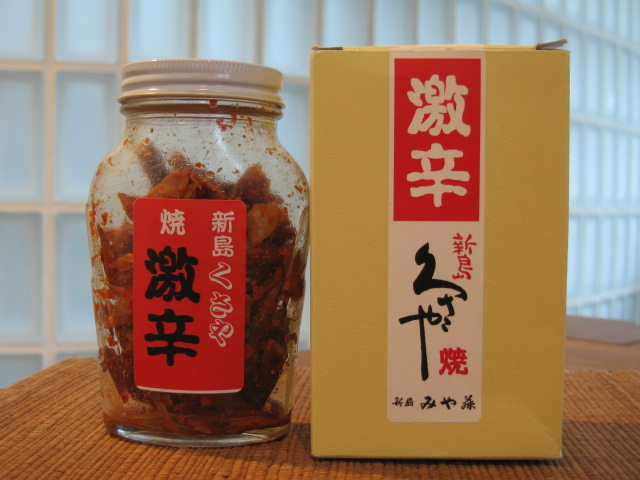
Bottled kusaya from Niijima island

This species is often used as food in many communities on islands nations around the western Pacific. It is significant for its use in preparing the Japanese snack kusaya, a traditional product of the Izu Islands. Filipino students near Calasiao have also created a twist on the lumpiang shanghai dish by mixing shredded mackerel scad and ginisang munggo. The two ingredients are combined with a mixture of minced onions, garlic, julienned carrots and papaya, thereafter placed inside spring roll wrappers and deep fried. Additionally, the Davao City dish paksiw na takway is sometimes made with ground mackerel scad. Pinaasakan sada or sada pinarasakan is a boiled, stir-fry dish of mackerel scad popular among the Dusun people of Sabah, in northern Malaysia.
