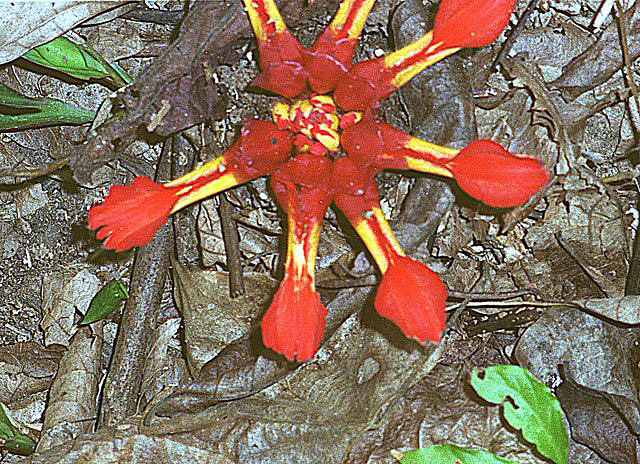

Scientific classification
- Kingdom: Plantae
- Clade: Embryophytes
- Clade: Tracheophytes
- Clade: Spermatophytes
- Clade: Angiosperms
- Clade: Monocots
- Clade: Commelinids
- Order: Zingiberales
- Family: Zingiberaceae
- Genus: Etlingera
- Species: E. coccinea

Binomial name
- Etlingera coccinea (Blume) S.Sakai & Nagam.

= Etlingera coccinea =

Species of flowering plant

Etlingera coccinea is a monocotyledonous species of flowering plant in the Zingiberaceae family, which is the ginger family. This plant is known for its strikingly beautiful and vivid red flowers that was first described by Carl Ludwig von Blume, and given its current name by S. Sakai and Hidetoshi Nagamasu. Etlingera coccinea is part of the genus Etlingera and the family Zingiberaceae. No subspecies are listed in the Catalog of Life.

Etlingera coccinea is native to Southeast Asia, including countries like Malaysia, Indonesia, and Thailand. It typically grows in tropical forests, thriving in humid and warm environments. The plant is the key ingredient in the making of tuhau, a traditional condiment or relish of the Dusuns of Sabah in Malaysia.
