= Bambangan (condiment) =

Traditional fermented condiment of Sabah, Malaysia

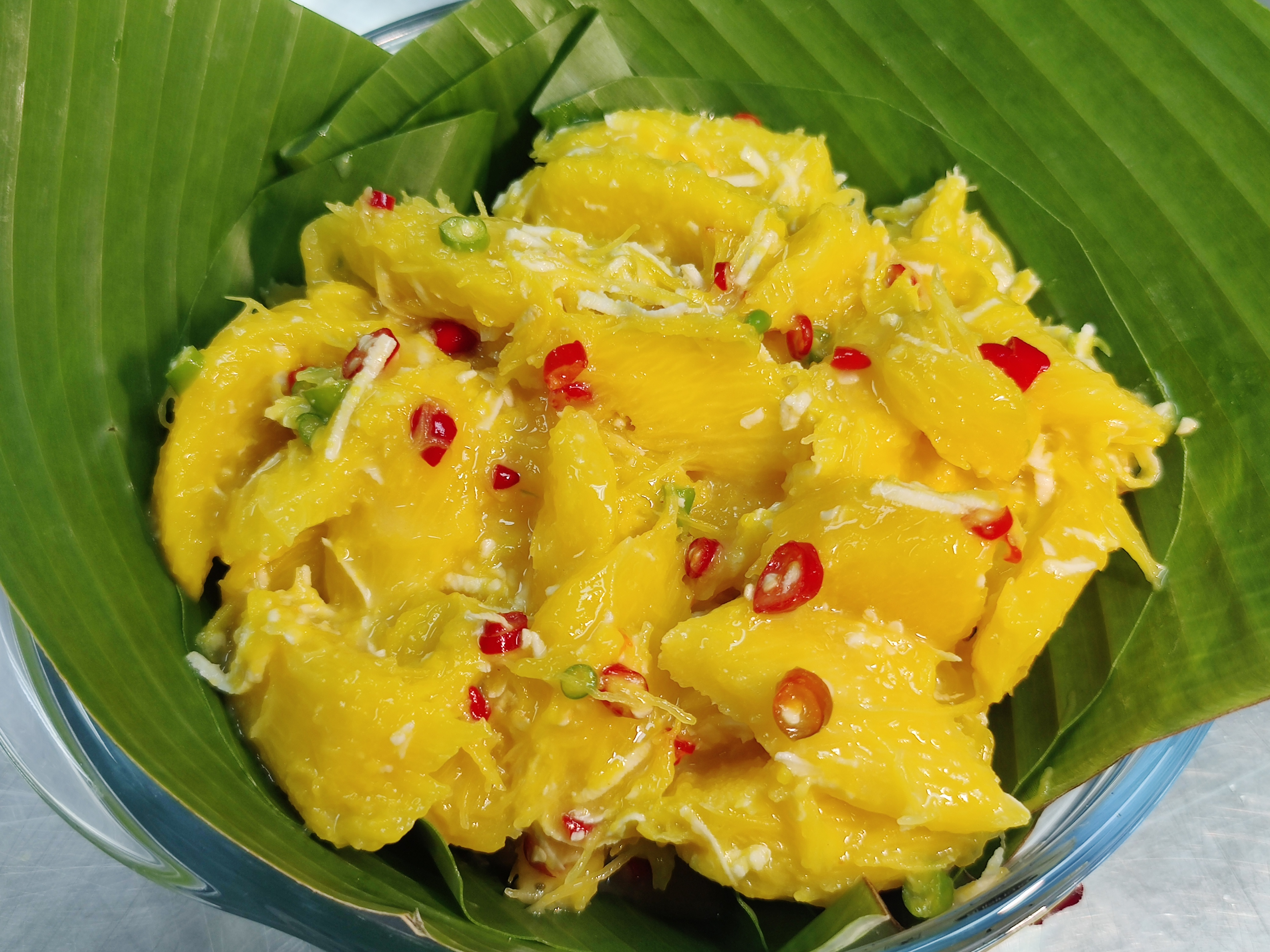
- Close-up of bambangan condiment served with bird's eye chilli in leaves
- Alternative names: Jeruk bambangan, toonsom or noonsom bambangan, and rinaal bambangan
- Type: Condiment and relish
- Course: Appetiser
- Place of origin: Malaysia
- Region or state: Sabah
- Associated cuisine: Sabahan cuisine
- Created by: Kadazan-Dusun
- Main ingredients: Grated bambangan fruit (Mangifera pajang) (Bornean wild mango)
- Ingredients generally used: Bird's eye chilli and salt
- Food energy (per serving): 35 kcal (150 kJ)

Bambangan (also known as toonsom/noonsom bambangan or rinaal bambangan in various Dusunic dialects) is a traditional native condiment/relish of the Kadazan-Dusun people in the state of Sabah within East Malaysia. It is made of Bornean wild mango from the species of Mangifera pajang, one of the household heritages among Sabah's main Dusunic indigenous community, apart from the bosou and tuhau, with origins from rural Sabah to its current presence in the markets and kitchens across the country of Malaysia. It is commonly paired with the raw fish salad dish of hinava, simmered fish of pinaasakan sada or also eaten with white rice, with flavours describes as a mix of tangy, sour, and sweet.

Rich in vitamin C as well as an antioxidant agent with high levels of beta-carotene for the maintenance of eye and skin health, the bambangan condiment can last for a year with proper storage. Its main ingredient, the fruit, is also known for its very strong and pungent smell, similar to durian, especially when it is ripe, although the unpleasant smell will disappear once it is turned into the condiment. In 2012, it was listed as an intangible cultural heritage of Malaysia in the category of National Heritage Food under the Department of National Heritage. In 2025, it was gazetted among the 117 local Malaysian foods of national heritage under the Declaration of Heritage Objects.

== Origin and background ==
The bambangan condiment has been a cultural heritage and inseparable part of the Kadazan-Dusun ethnics, where the Mangifera pajang tree has been growing in the wild of the indigenous homeland and cultivated by them through seed propagation. The plant species from the Anacardiaceae family is widely found in the Borneo islands, especially Sabah where it has been part of the state food heritage. The fruit can be found sold in almost every Sabah's weekly market (tamu) and vegetables market.

== Preparation ==
The condiment is prepared by washing fresh bambangan (Mangifera pajang) fruits, and the surface of the fruit needs to be wiped completely dry to prevent dirt attached to its skin from touching the inside of the fruit. The skin will then peel thinly so as not to let one touch the inside part, with the outer layers being used in condiment making. It was then wiped until clean and cut into small cubes, with the inner seed part of the fruit also being taken, washed, and cut into small pieces or blended. The inner seed part will then be mixed with the inside of the bambangan fruit with the addition of salt, with the ratio of salt to bambangan seeds being 2:1. All ingredients, including bird's eye chilli, will be mixed and stirred until smooth before being transferred into a jar or plastic container and filled until it becomes solid form, and the air or wind needs to exit when it is placed inside the container. The condiment mixture is left to ferment for around 7–10 days under room temperature in a tightly closed container.

== Gallery ==
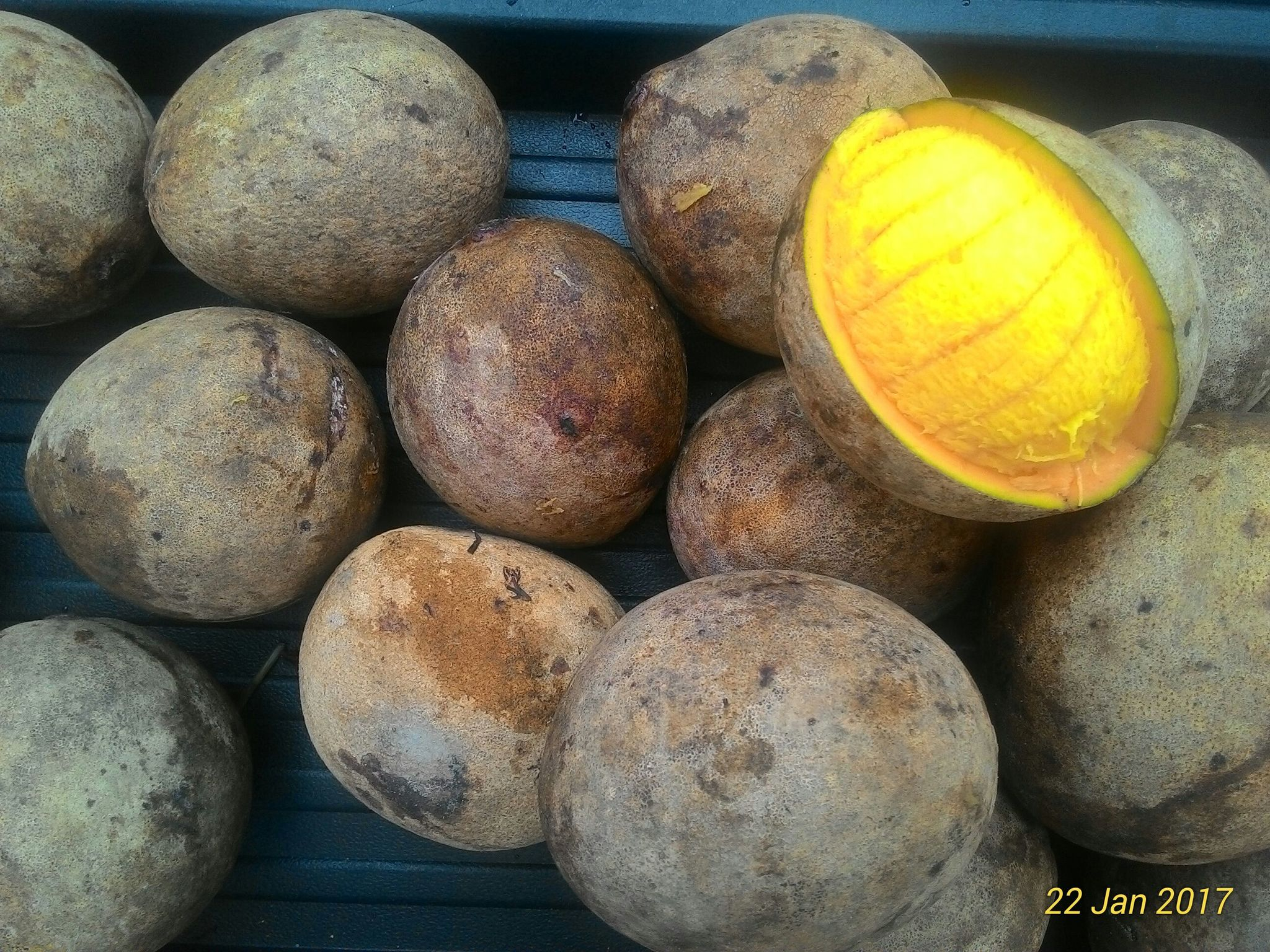
Freshly collected bambangan (Mangifera pajang) fruit which is ready to be made as a condiment

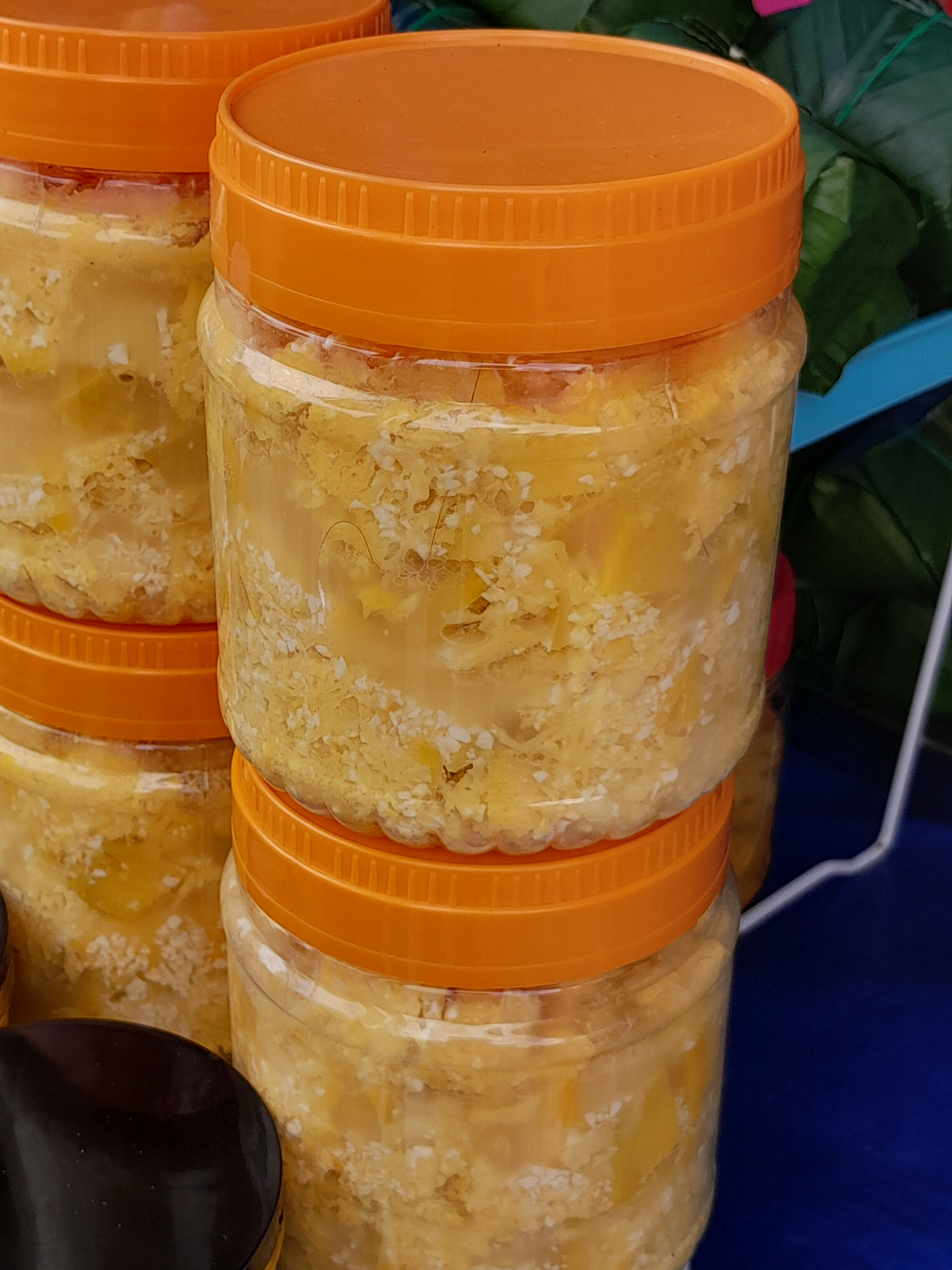
Bambangan condiment is sold in a plastic jar at the tamu (weekend market) of Sabah, Malaysia

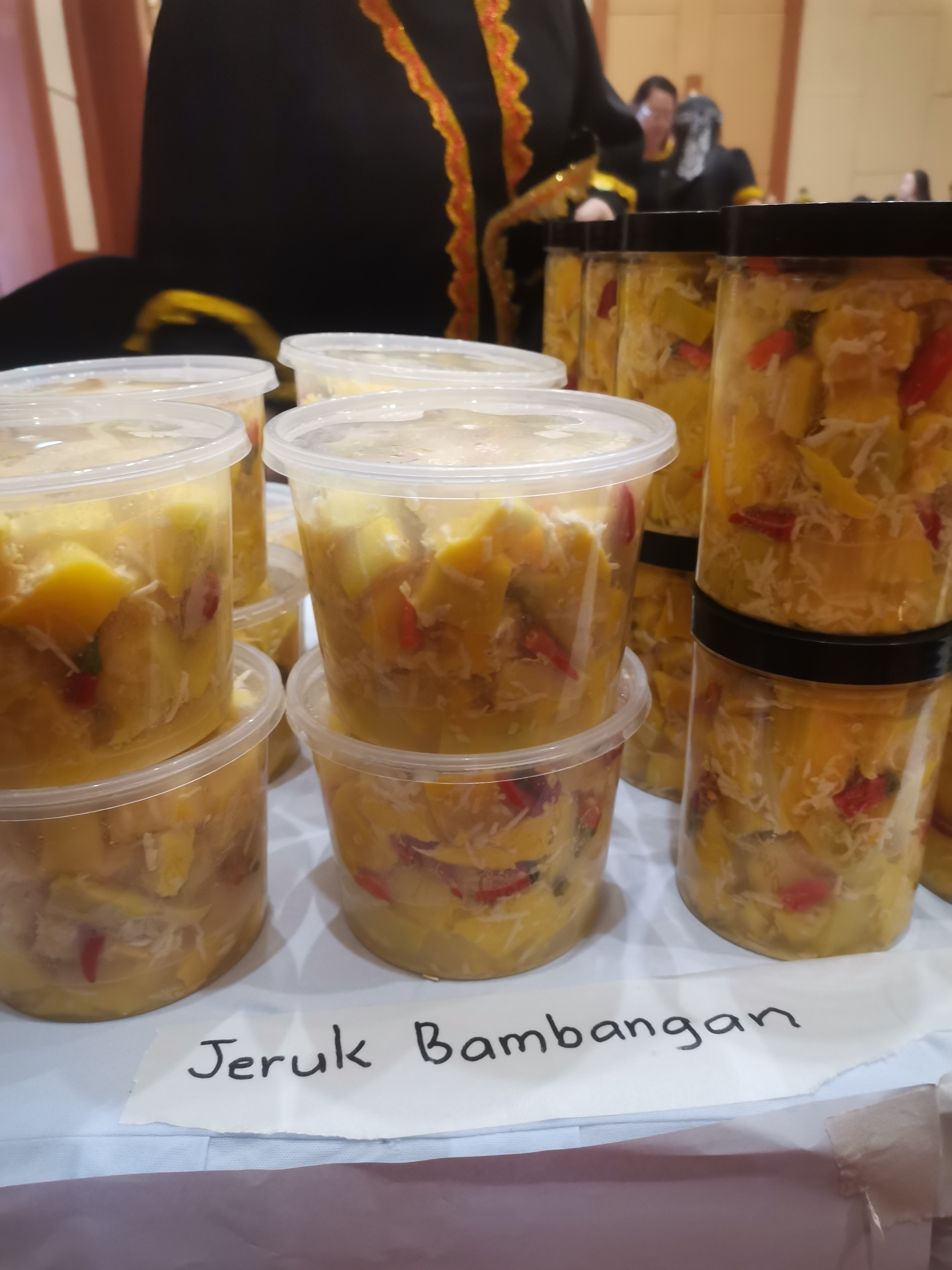
Bambangan condiment in a plastic container and jar during a cultural event

== See also ==
- List of condiments
- List of fermented foods
- Bosou
- Tuhau
