= Sigup kirai =

Northern Bornean traditional cigarette

The sigup kirai sold in Sabah's tamu (weekly market) in Tamparuli, sub-district of Tuaran District

Sigup kirai or simply kirai is a type of Bornean traditional hand-rolled cigarette made from Nypa fruticans leaflet, which is popular among the elderly of the Kadazan-Dusun, Bajau community of Sabah and Malays of Sarawak in East Malaysia, the Bruneian Malays of Brunei, as well as the Palembang people of South Sumatra in Indonesia.

== Etymology ==
The "sigup" (ms) carries the meaning of "cigarette" in both Brunei Malay and Dusun languages, while "kirai" refers to its name, where it is also widely referred to as tobako cina (Chinese cigarette) or sigup daun (leaf cigarette). Among the West Coast Bajau (Bajau Samah) community, the kirai leaves are called bungkosan. In neighbouring Sarawak, the cigarette is known as rokok daun apong among the local Malays. In South Sumatra, Indonesia, it is known as rokok nipah or rokok daun nipah, while in West Malaysia, it is known as the rokok daun. Within the language of Peninsular Malay, kirai carries the meaning of a plant root from the species of Hiptage sericea Hook. fil. (Malpighiaceae). In Thailand, the kirai cigarette is known locally as "จาก" (chaak). (Note: Based on the writings by Prince Damrong Rajanubhab, the French envoy Simon de la Loubère—who visited during the reign of King Narai—noted in his accounts of Siam that both Thai men and women enjoyed smoking a particularly pungent variety of tobacco, with the tobacco leaves used in the kingdom of Ayutthaya being sourced from either Spanish Manila, Qing China, or cultivated locally. Several other sources also stated it was the Portuguese who brought both tobacco leaves and seeds to the old capital (Ayutthaya), as the inhabitants were known to be tobacco users themselves, and it is believed that the plant was introduced to Thailand via Malaya or India.)

== Background and history ==
Based on oral tradition and history from both the Kadazan-Dusun and Bajau communities of North Borneo, the method of hand-rolled leaf cigarettes was introduced or popularised by early Chinese traders and migrants throughout their migration, combined with the huge availability of Nypa fruticans within the coasts and rivers of North Borneo, and has been gathered by the Dusuns for generations. It is deeply embedded in Sabah's local culture among the indigenous peoples, where it is found sold by indigenous elderly women in weekly open-air markets (tamu) throughout Sabah, particularly on the western coast and interior. The use of kirai among the indigenous elderly Dusun women and its sale in the weekly market of tamu has been recorded since the British protectorate period, such as in the "Diaries of George Cathcart Woolley, 1913–1919" and "Among Primitive Peoples in Borneo: A Description of the Lives, Habits & Customs of the Piratical Head-hunters of North Borneo, with an Account of Interesting Objects of Prehistoric Antiquity Discovered in the Island, 1922" by Ivor Hugh Norman Evans. In the early 1880s, the British, through the North Borneo Chartered Company (NBCC), started trial planting of tobacco in the Sandakan area, with the first North Borneo's tobacco leaf sold in Amsterdam, Netherlands, which was considered to be among the finest in the world, where the cultivation later intensified.

== Features ==
The tobacco inside plastic packing which is the main ingredients inside the hand rolled kirai

The cigarette consists of two main items sold separately in local tamu, the dry hand-rolled Nypa fruticans leaflet tied with a rubber band and the tobacco inside plastic packing, where it is placed inside the traditional leaf cigarette.

Through the monumpoli/monumpohi death rites of the Papar Kadazan, the hand-rolled sigup would also be placed if the deceased had a habit of smoking throughout his/her lifetime.

== Bibliography ==
- Royal Asiatic Society of Great Britain and Ireland. Straits Branch (1895). Journal of the Straits Branch of the Royal Asiatic Society. Agents of the Society, American Mission Press.
- Marshall, H. B. (1921). A Vocabulary of Brunei Malay (PDF). Journal of the Straits Branch of the Royal Asiatic Society, Malaysian Branch of the Royal Asiatic Society, Methodist Publishing House.
- Evans, Ivor Hugh Norman (1922). Among Primitive Peoples in Borneo: A Description of the Lives, Habits & Customs of the Piratical Head-hunters of North Borneo, with an Account of Interesting Objects of Prehistoric Antiquity Discovered in the Island. Seeley, Service and Company limited.
- Chin, Lucas; Mashman, Valerie (1991). Sarawak Cultural Legacy: A Living Tradition. Society Atelier Sarawak.
- Chong-Ying, Gan (1995). "SMOKELESS TOBACCO USE AMONG RURAL KADAZAN WOMEN IN SABAH, MALAYSIA" (PDF). The Southeast Asian Journal of Tropical Medicine and Public Health. 26 (2) (Department of Social and Preventive Medicine, Faculty of Medicine, University of Malaya ed.): 291–296. Archived (PDF) from the original on 12 November 2026 – via Mahidol University, Faculty of Tropical Science.
- Puteh (Abang), Yusuf Abang (1998). The Malays of Sarawak: A Socio-political Portrait. Shobra Publications. ISBN 978-983-9127-02-7.
- Daud, Maimunah (1999). Glimpses of Malay Life in Sarawak. Sarawak Malay Cultural Foundation. ISBN 978-983-99472-1-2.
- Chong-Ying, Gan (2000). Tobacco habits among Bajau and Kadazan women in Sabah, Malaysia. Tobacco: The Growing Epidemic. Vol. 21. p. 394. doi:10.1007/978-1-4471-0769-9_97 – via Springer Nature.
- Chong-Ying, Gan (2001). "Gender differences in tobacco habits among rural Kadazans and Bajaus in Sabah. (Research Notes)". Borneo Research Bulletin: 172 – via Gale Academic Onefile.
- Bali, K. (2002). Dari Tendong ke Borneo: memoir karyawan tamu DBP Cawangan Sabah [From Tendong to Borneo: A Memoir by a Visiting Writer at the DBP Sabah Branch] (in Malay). Institute of Language and Literature, Malaysia. ISBN 978-983-62-7189-1.
- Muhammad (Haji.), Nayan (2012). Kraf tangan Brunei: anyaman [Brunei handicrafts: weaving] (in Malay). Institute of Language and Literature of Brunei, Ministry of Culture, Youth and Sports. ISBN 978-99917-0-830-0.
- Haji Mahali, Saidatul Nornis (2012). Bajau pantai barat [West Coast Bajau] (in Malay). Institute of Translation & Malaysian Books. ISBN 978-983-068-856-5.
- Woolley, George Cathcart (2015). The Diaries of George C. Woolley: 1913-1919. Department of Sabah Museum. ISBN 978-983-9638-33-2.
