= Bosou =

Traditional fermented condiment of Sabah, Malaysia

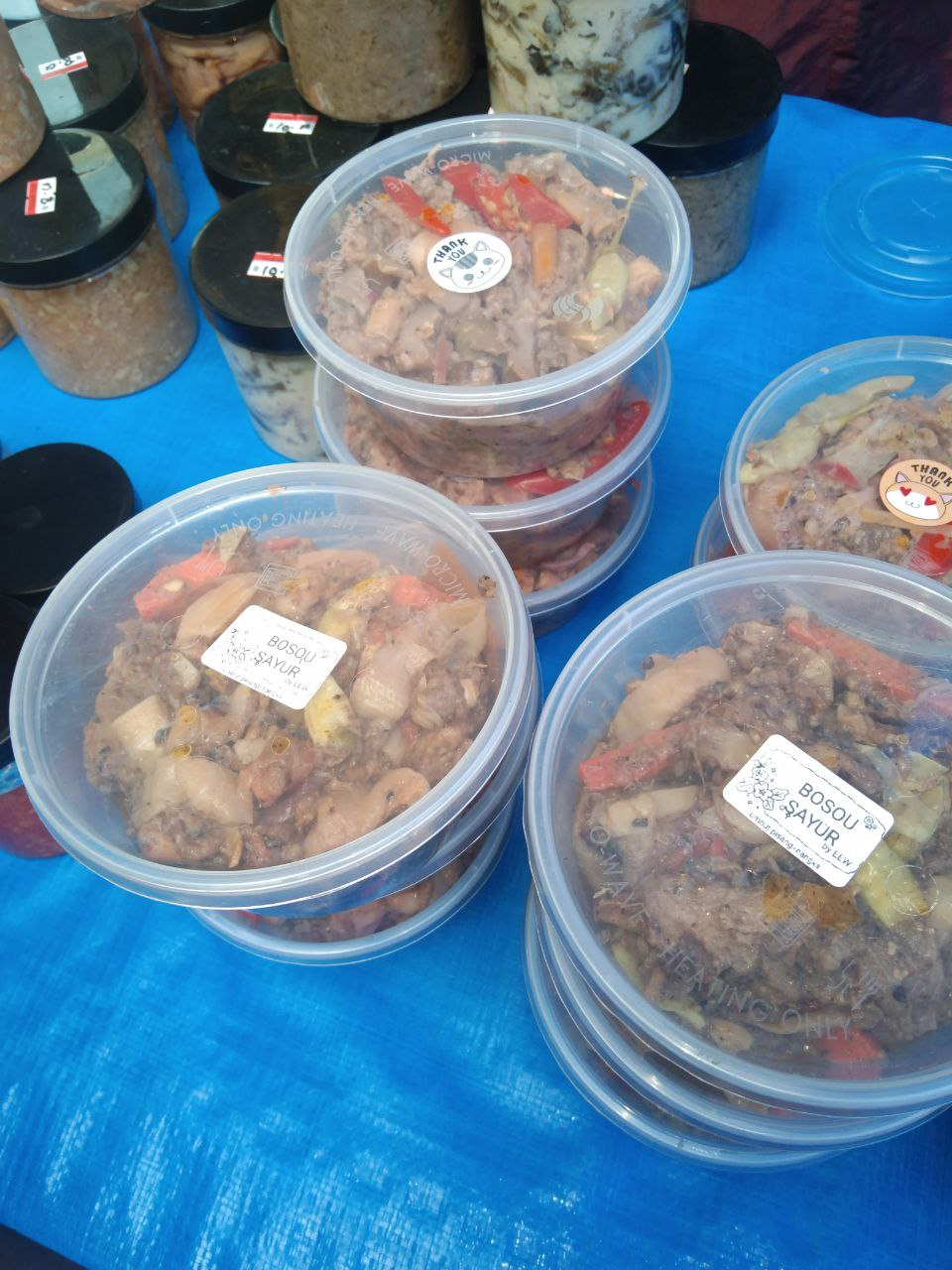
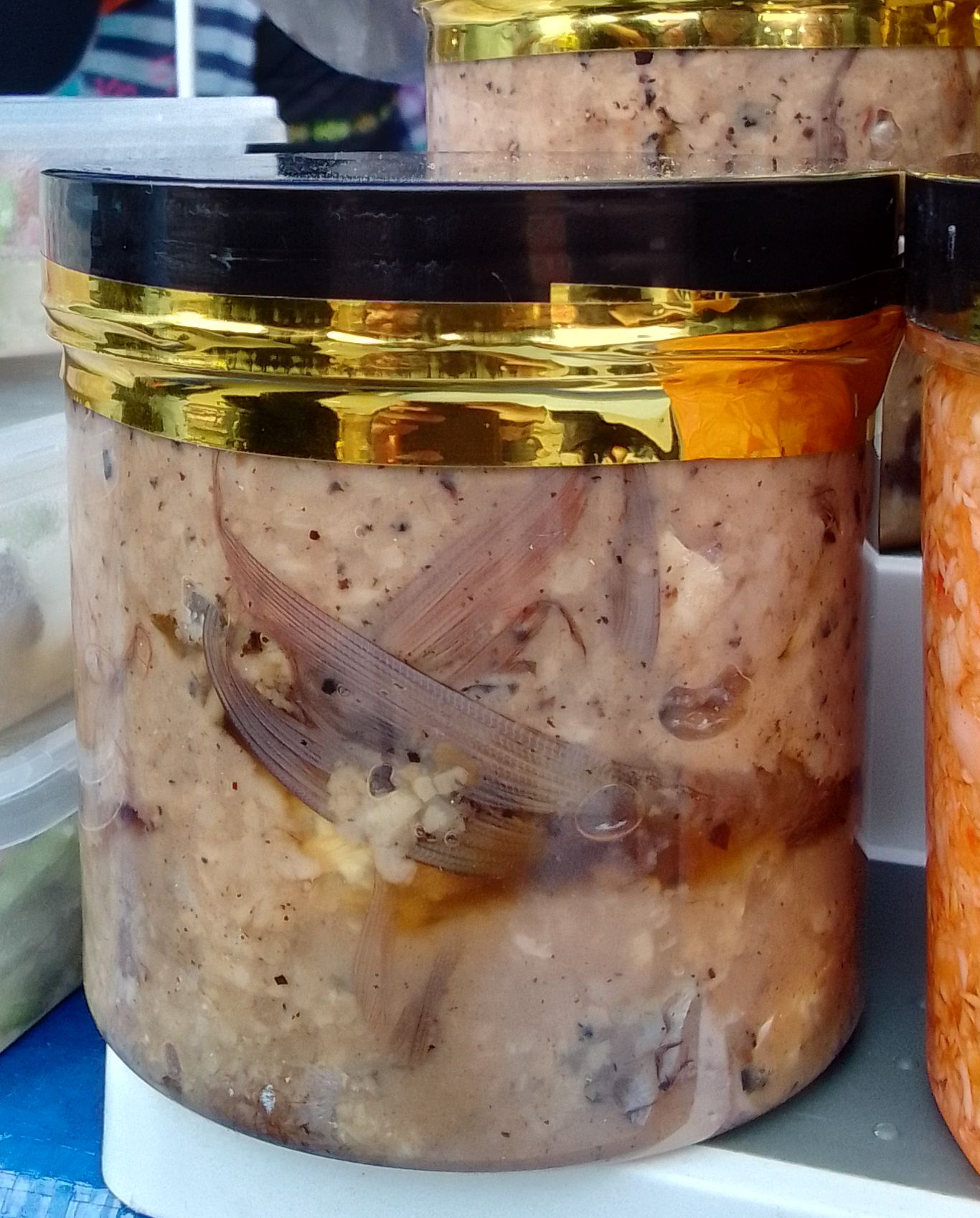
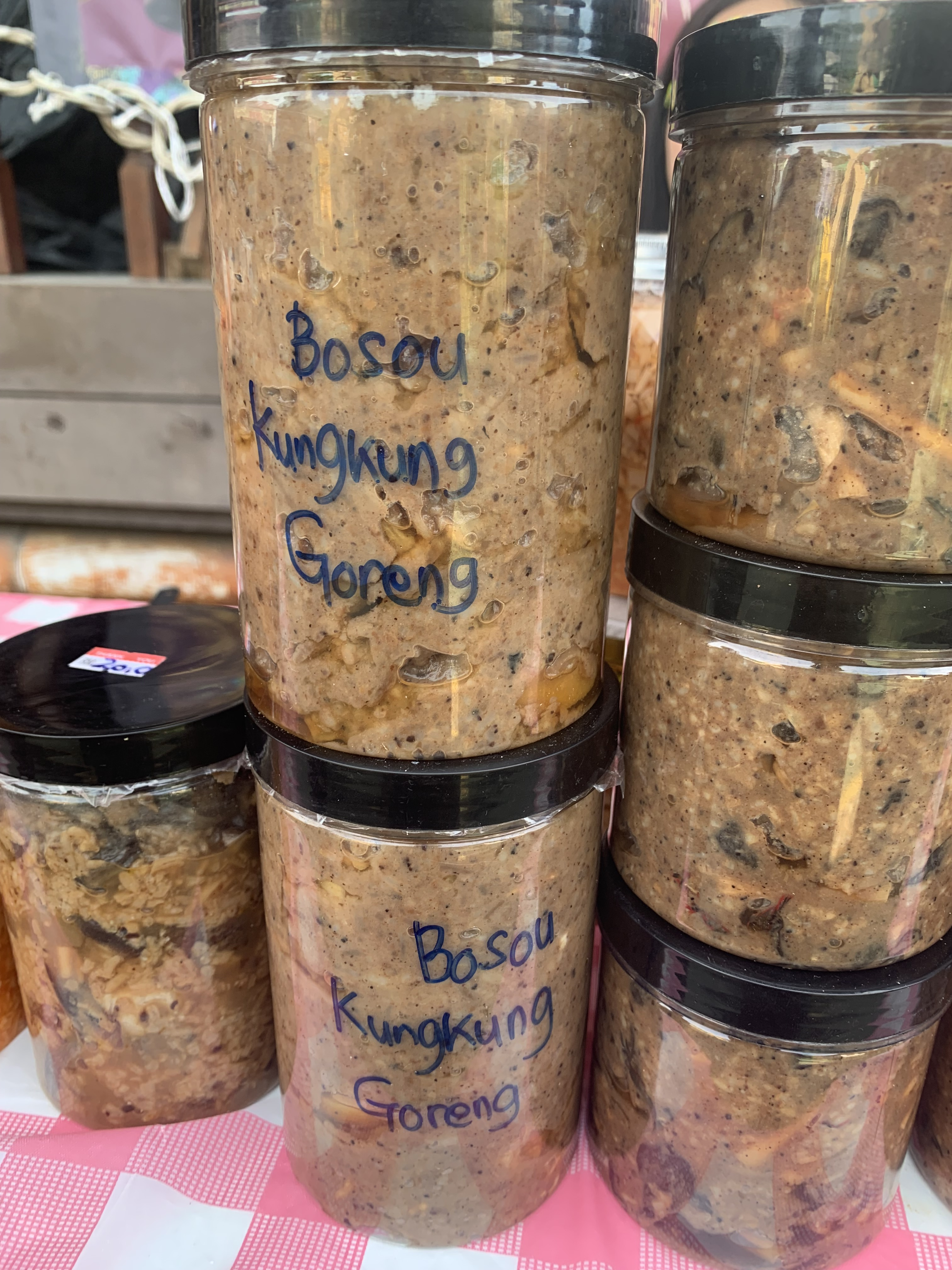
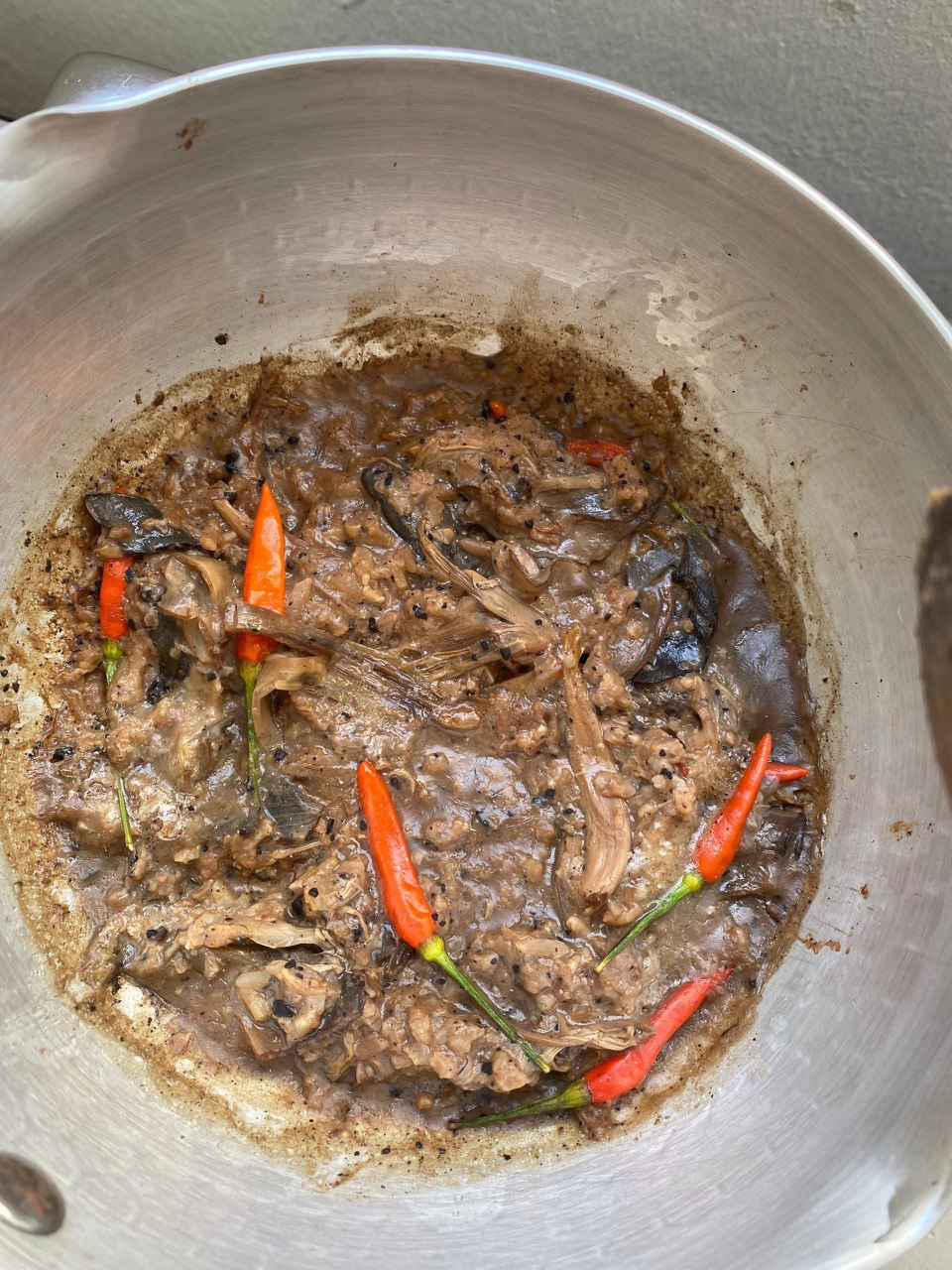
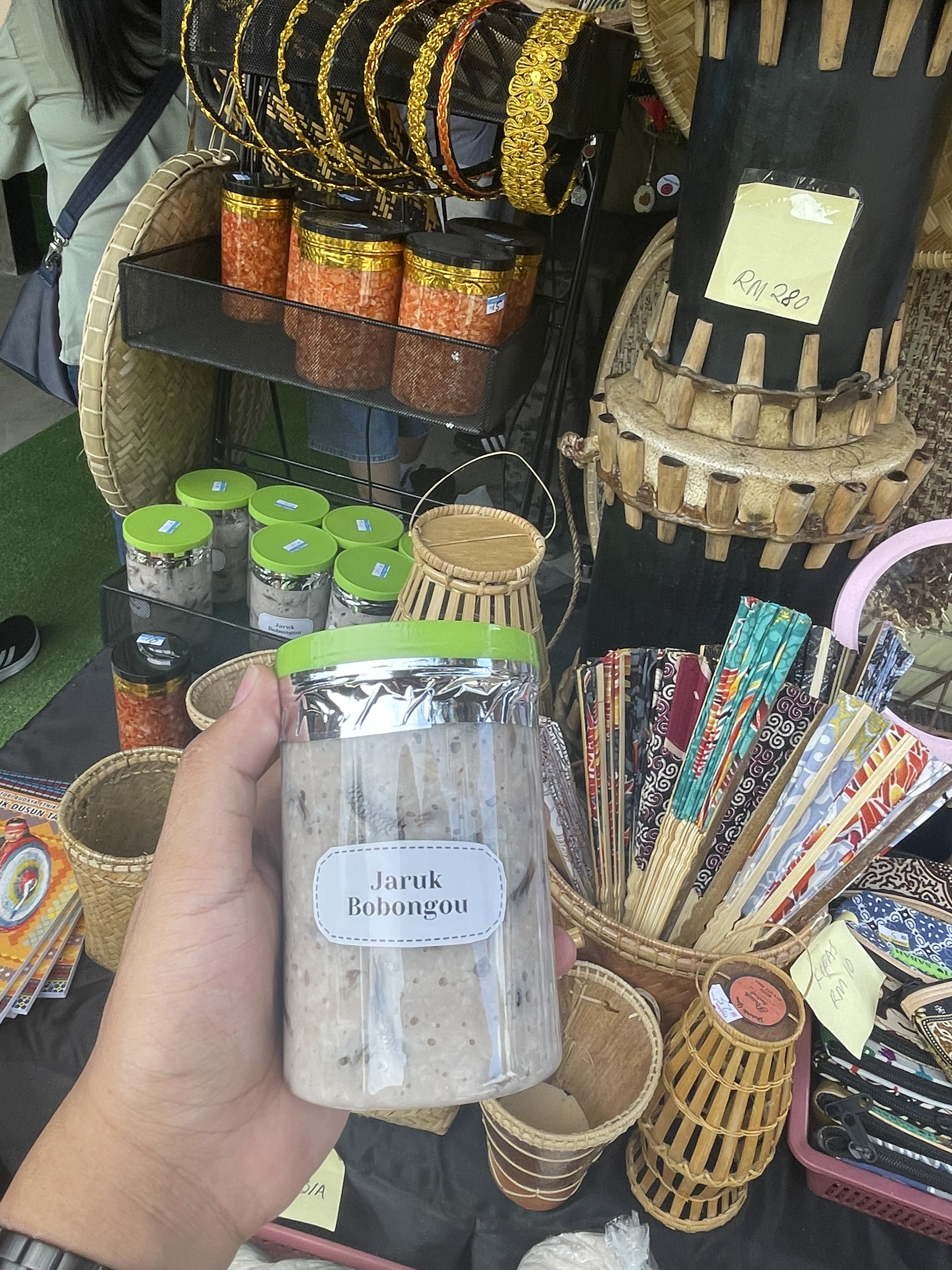
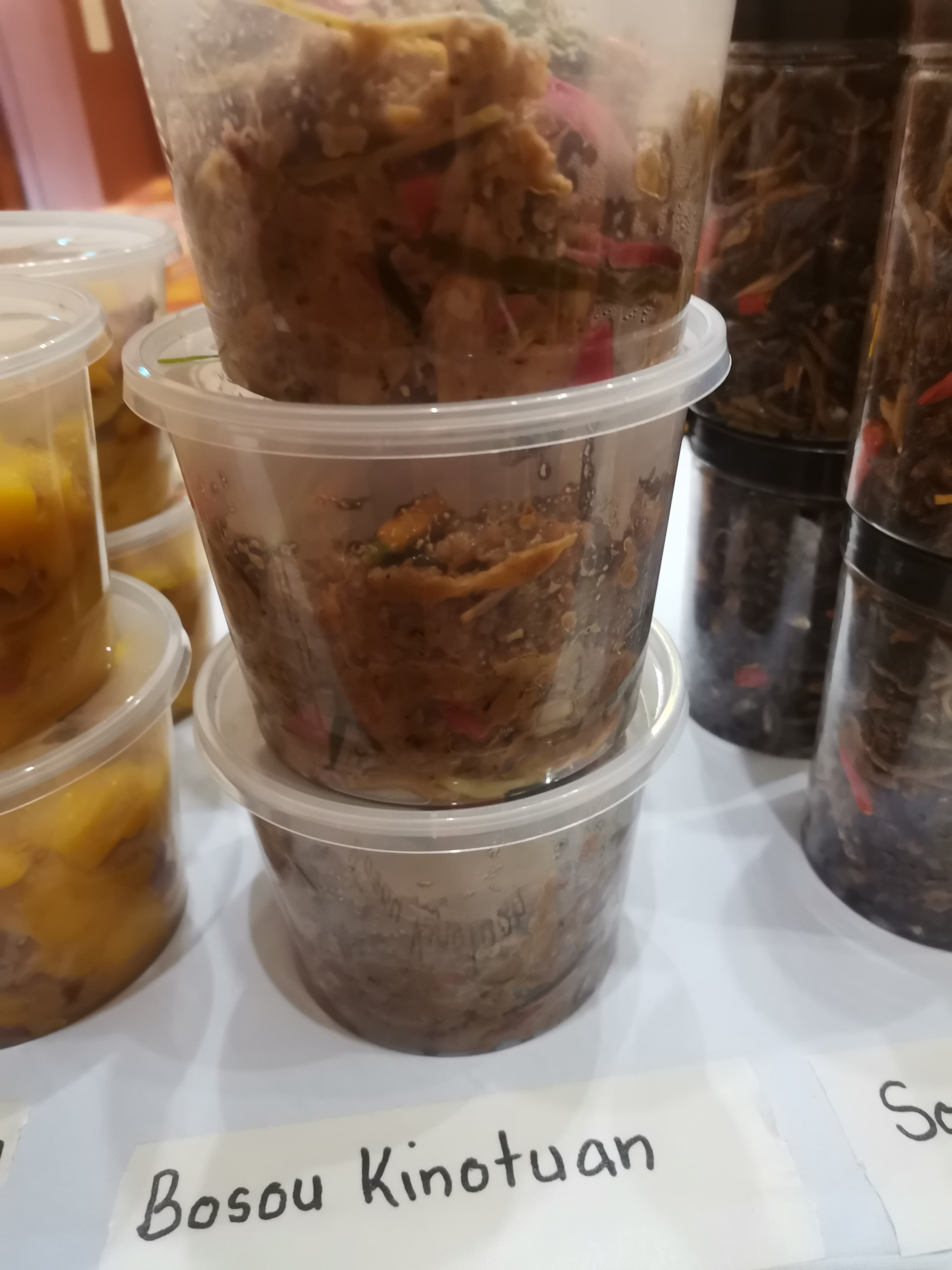
- Different types of bosou in Sabah, Malaysia. From clockwise: sada (fish), todok punti (banana flower), kinotuan (vegetables), bobongou (fermented fish), and kungkung (animal skin) types of bosou
- Alternative names: nonsom, noonsom, tonsom, and tinamba
- Type: Fermented food
- Course: Condiment
- Place of origin: Malaysia
- Region or state: East Malaysia (Sabah)
- Associated cuisine: Sabahan cuisine
- Created by: Kadazan-Dusun
- Main ingredients: Either vegetables, freshwater fish, or meat mixed with salt, white rice, and pangi fruit (Pangium edule)
- Food energy (per serving): 85 kcal (360 kJ)

Bosou (or also known as nonsom, noonsom, tonsom or tinamba in various Dusunic dialects) is a traditional fermented condiment among the indigenous Kadazan-Dusun in Sabah of East Malaysia. It is produced through the process of preserving either vegetables, freshwater fish, or meat mixed with salt, white rice, and pangi fruit (Pangium edule) as the main preservative. Bosou has a distinctive salty and tangy flavour where it is usually eaten raw as condiment or served with white rice and even fried noodles or bee hoon, but is more typically cooked with other meats and vegetables.

Its counterpart in West Malaysia is the pekasam with noticeable differences especially in the terms of materials used to prepare the bosou, which uses the pangi fruit. It is always kept in an airtight container after being produced due to its strong odour.

== Origin and background ==
It is one of the traditional food heritages of Sabah's main indigenous people, the Kadazan-Dusun. The existence of bosou originated from a traditional solution to avoid food waste, especially when there is a large catch of fish and excess vegetables before the advent of modern refrigeration facilities.

== Preparation ==
The bosou is made by mixing either vegetables, freshwater fish, or various types of meat with white rice, salt, and pangi fruit (Pangium edule) as preservative. Pangi seeds are naturally toxic when consumed raw, but the indigenous Kadazan-Dusun people have a method to remove the poison by fermenting it with food. The mixture is then stored in a plastic or glass jar and marinated for two weeks to a month. The bacteria present in the rice naturally break down carbohydrates into lactic acid, which creates an acidic environment that preserves the food. Through the process of fermentation, kinotuan (vegetable) bosou is safe to eat raw after seven days; sada (fish) bosou need around three weeks to a month to soften the fish bones for it to be eaten raw, while Bornean wild boar (meat) bosou needs to be cooked first to safely eliminate bacteria. Other ingredients such as chillies, ginger and onion are usually added to the bosou to enhance the flavours. Most commercial bosou sold in jars at tamu markets is often fermented for 6–8 weeks.

== See also ==
- List of condiments
- List of fermented foods
- Bambangan
- Tuhau
