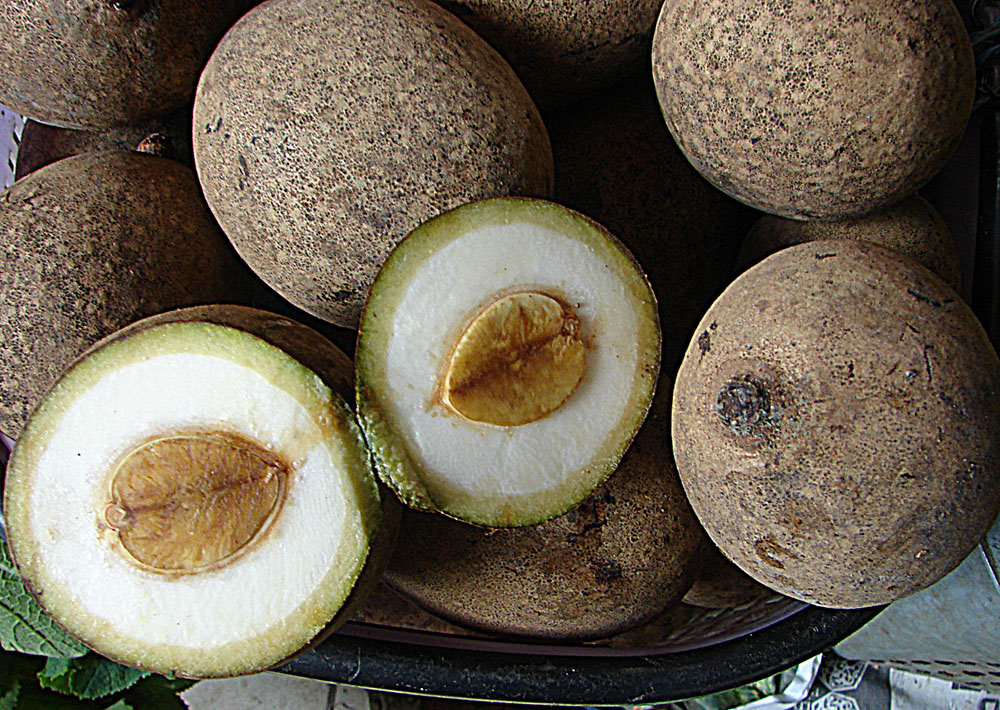

Conservation status
- Vulnerable (IUCN 2.3)

Scientific classification
- Kingdom: Plantae
- Clade: Embryophytes
- Clade: Tracheophytes
- Clade: Spermatophytes
- Clade: Angiosperms
- Clade: Eudicots
- Clade: Rosids
- Order: Sapindales
- Family: Anacardiaceae
- Genus: Mangifera
- Species: M. pajang

Binomial name
- Mangifera pajang Kosterm.

= Mangifera pajang =

Species of flowering plant

Mangifera pajang, commonly known as wild mango, is a species of tree in the family Anacardiaceae. It is endemic to Borneo, where it is known by the various native names: buah bambangan, buah mawang and buah embang.

== Description ==
It is a tall tree, which can grow up to 15 to 50 meters (49 to 164 ft) tall. The leaves are simple, oblong shaped (28 – 45 centimeters long and 10-15 centimeters wide) with petioles that are 5-7 centimeters long. The tree is not grown commercially and can be found in the forests in Sabah and Sarawak, Malaysia.

The flowers are elliptic-oblong and have 5 petals that are purplish-red on the inner surface and pinkish-white on the outside.

The fruit is a fleshly drupe of globose shape measuring 15–20 cm across and has a rough skin, which is 5-7 millimeters thick. The wild mango fruits are green when unripe and change to a brown color when ripe. The flesh is yellow, thick and very fibrous. Wild mango flesh is aromatic and tastes sweet and sour. The peel is very tough and has a corrosive latex layer. The latex is known to cause burns to lips and cause blisters.

The fruit is widely consumed by the indigenous Kadazan-Dusun people of Sabah as a condiment.
