= Garcinia parvifolia =

Conservation status
- Least Concern (IUCN 3.1)

Scientific classification
- Kingdom: Plantae
- Clade: Tracheophytes
- Clade: Angiosperms
- Clade: Eudicots
- Clade: Rosids
- Order: Malpighiales
- Family: Clusiaceae
- Genus: Garcinia
- Species: G. parvifolia

Binomial name
- Garcinia parvifolia (Miq.) Miq.

Synonyms
- Garcinia globulosa Ridl.; Garcinia tetangies Boerl.; Rhinostigma parvifolium Miq.

Species of tree

Garcinia parvifolia, the Kundong, Kumanjing, Brunei cherry or Asam aur aur, is a tropical evergreen tree native to Borneo, Peninsular Malaysia, Sulawesi and Sumatra. The tree is found at elevations of 600–800 metres (2,000–2,600 ft) in humid environments, and grows to a height of 33 metres (108 ft). The bark, wood, leaves, and fruit of the kundong tree are used by humans.

The species was first described as Rhinostigma parvifolium by Friedrich Anton Wilhelm Miquel in 1861. In 1864 Miquel placed the species in genus Garcinia as G. parvifolia.

== Propagation ==
Kundong trees grow in the humid interior of Borneo. The trees can be found at higher elevations along ridges and near riverbanks. The kundong propagates through seeds that take around six months to germinate. The tree grows quickly and once planted can produce fruit in as little as 4 years. The majority of kundong grow in the wild, but the tree can be cultivated in gardens.

== Usage ==
In Borneo the bark of the tree is used to produce resin, while the wood is used in furniture or for carving. The juvenile leaves of the tree are eaten as a vegetable. The plant is used as a rootstock for mangosteen.

=== Fruit ===
Kundong can be eaten raw or cooked. The small red-yellow fruit has a sour taste with a sweet white pulp. Younger fruits are used to produce a sour taste in other types of food, such as curry. The fruit is about the size of a cherry and looks similar to a purple mangosteen, hence the nicknames Brunei cherry (interchangeable with Borneo cherry) and red mangosteen.
