= Boiled fish =

Fish boiled with salt for preservation

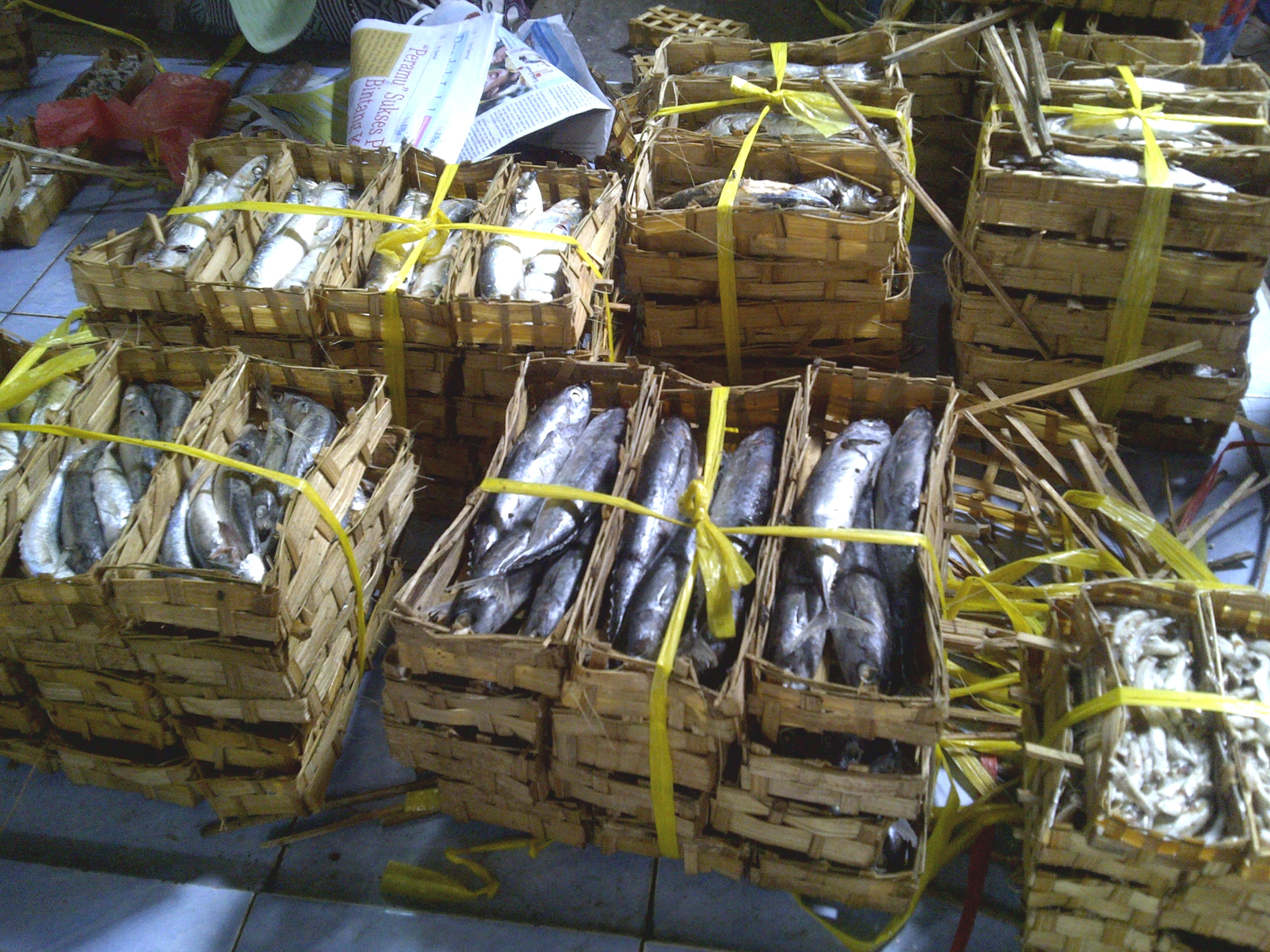
Bamboo-packed mackerel pindang, sold in traditional market in Indonesia.

Boiled fish, or more precisely salt-boiled fish, is fish boiled with salt and thus preserved for later consumption. Although this method is used in other parts of the world, it is of major commercial significance only in Southeast Asia. The shelf life of products so treated can range from as little as one or two days, up to several months. In Indonesia, this fish preservation method is known as pindang.

== Preservation method ==
The technique works to preserve fish through both exposure to high temperatures and salting — the high temperature of boiling water kills microbes that might otherwise decompose the fish flesh while the application of salt directly promotes preservation.

This technique is especially prevalent in the tropics during monsoon season, since the torrential rains hinder the simpler and traditional salting and sun-drying method of preservation. This salted fish method is considered 'dry preservation', while the Pindang method is often called 'wet preservation'.

After being covered in coarse salt, the fish are boiled on a low flame until the liquids are evaporated and the salt seasoning is well absorbed into fish. The wet boiling method requires less salt than dry preservation, and thus the taste is not as salty as that of sun-dried salted fish.

Although the basic ingredients often involve only fish, water, and salt, other ingredients, especially spices or herbs that contain tannin, can be added to boost preservation effectiveness. Examples of sources of tannin used include turmeric, tamarind, shallot skin, teak leaves, guava leaves, tea, and soy sauce, as well as other spices common in Southeast Asia. Including tannins gives the food a yellowish to brown color and fish so treated will last longer than fish preserved via the plain boiled method.

== Regional variation ==
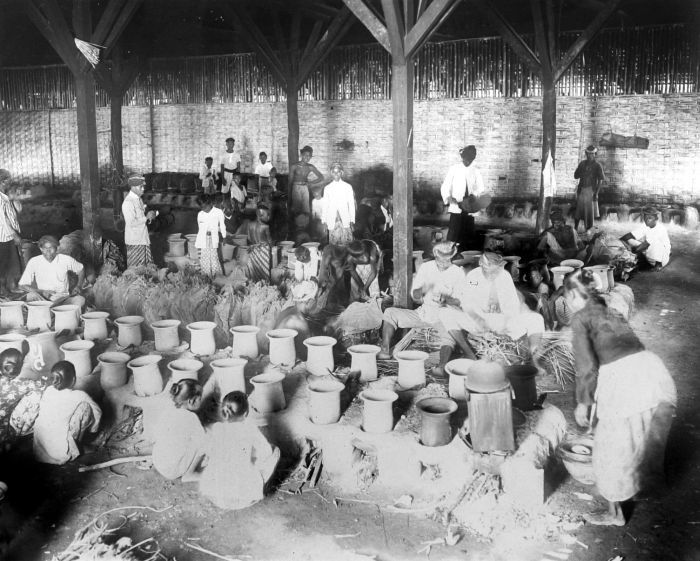
Pindang making in Blimbing, East Java circa 1920s.

In Indonesia, various boiled fish products are generally known as pindang, and the method of preparation is often described as 'Indonesian salt-boiled fish'.

== See also ==
- Cured fish
- Fish processing
- Fish preservation
- Salted fish
- Salted squid
- Dried shrimp
- Brining
