= Australo-Melanesian =

Outdated grouping of human beings

Australo-Melanesians (also known as Australasians or the Australomelanesoid, Australoid or Australioid race) is an outdated historical grouping of various people indigenous to Melanesia and Australia. Controversially, some groups found in parts of Southeast Asia and South Asia were also sometimes included.

While most authors included Papuans, Aboriginal Australians and Melanesians (mainly from Fiji, New Caledonia, Solomon Islands, and Vanuatu), there was controversy about the inclusion of the various Southeast Asian populations grouped as "Negrito", or a number of dark-skinned tribal populations of the Indian subcontinent.

The concept of dividing humankind into three, four or five races (often called Caucasoid, Mongoloid, Negroid, and Australoid) was introduced in the 18th century and further developed by Western scholars in the context of racist ideologies during the age of colonialism. With the rise of modern genetics, the concept of distinct human races in a biological sense has become obsolete. In 2019, the American Association of Biological Anthropologists stated: "The belief in “races” as natural aspects of human biology, and the structures of inequality (racism) that emerge from such beliefs, are among the most damaging elements in the human experience both today and in the past."

== Terminological history ==
The term "Australoid" was coined in ethnology in the mid 19th century, describing tribes or populations "of the type of native Australians". The term "Australioid race" was introduced by Thomas Huxley in 1870 to refer to certain peoples indigenous to South and Southeast Asia and Oceania. In physical anthropology, Australoid is used for morphological features characteristic of Aboriginal Australians by Daniel John Cunningham in his Text-book of Anatomy (1902). An Australioid (sic, with an additional -i-) racial group was first proposed by Thomas Huxley in an essay On the Geographical Distribution of the Chief Modifications of Mankind (1870), in which he divided humanity into four principal groups (Xanthochroic, Mongoloid, Negroid, and Australioid). His original model included the native inhabitants of Deccan in India under the Australoid category, specifically "in a well-marked form" among the hill tribes of the Deccan Plateau. Huxley further classified the Melanochroi (Peoples of the Mediterranean race) as a mixture of the Xanthochroi (northern Europeans) and Australioids.

Huxley (1870) described Australioids as dolichocephalic; their hair as usually silky, black and wavy or curly, with large, heavy jaws and prognathism, with skin the color of chocolate and irises which are dark brown or black.

The term "Proto-Australoid" was used by Roland Burrage Dixon in his Racial History of Man (1923). In The Origin of Races (1962), Carleton Coon expounded his system of five races (Australoid, Caucasoid, Mongoloid, Congoid and Capoid) with separate origins. Based on such evidence as claiming Australoids had the largest, megadont teeth, this group was assessed by Coon as being the most archaic and therefore the most primitive and backward. Coon's methods and conclusions were later discredited and show either a "poor understanding of human cultural history and evolution or his use of ethnology for a racialist agenda."

Terms associated with outdated notions of racial types, such as those ending in "-oid" have come to be seen as potentially offensive and related to scientific racism.

== Controversies ==
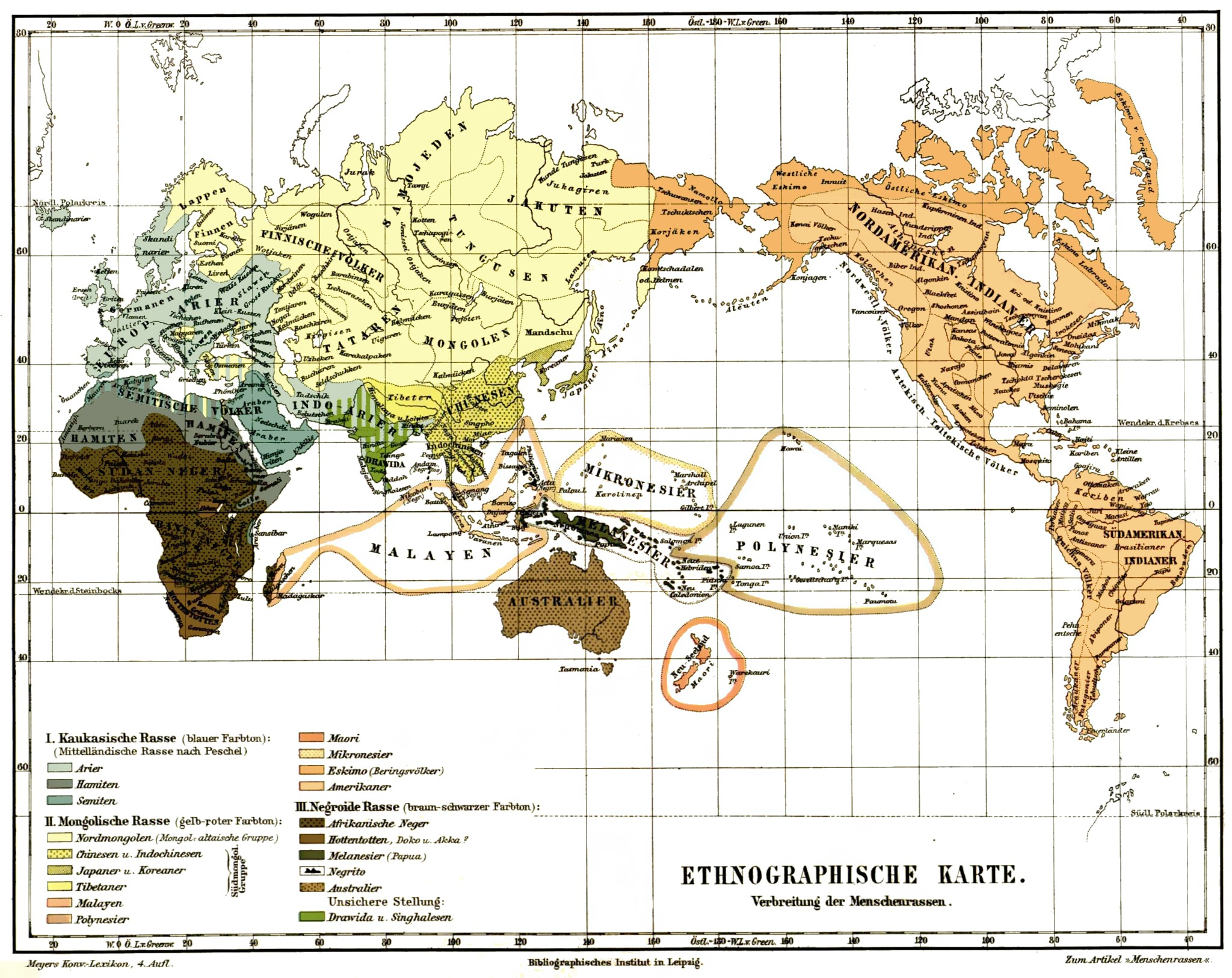
Meyers Konversations-Lexikon (1885–1890) ethnographic map: Caucasoid: Aryan Semitic Hamitic Negroid: African Negro Khoikhoi Melanesian Negrito Australoid Uncertain: Dravida & Sinhalese / Mongoloid: North Mongol Chinese & Indochinese Korean & Japanese Tibetan & Burmese Malay Polynesian Maori Micronesian Eskimo / Inuit American

The populations grouped as "Negrito", such as the Andamanese (from the Andaman Islands in the Indian Ocean), the Semang and Batek peoples (from Malaysia), the Maniq people (from Thailand), the Aeta people, the Ati people, and certain other ethnic groups in the Philippines, the Vedda people of Sri Lanka and a number of dark-skinned tribal populations in the interior of the Indian subcontinent (some Dravidian-speaking tribes and Austroasiatic-speaking Munda peoples) were also suggested by some to belong to the Australo-Melanesian group, but there were controversies about this inclusion.

The inclusion of Indian tribes in the group was not well-defined, and was closely related to the question of the original peopling of India, and the possible shared ancestry between Indian, Andamanese, and Sahulian populations of the Upper Paleolithic.

The suggested Australo-Melanesian ancestry of the original South Asian populations has long remained an open question. It was embraced by Indian anthropologists as emphasising the deep antiquity of Indian prehistory. Australo-Melanesian hunter-gatherer and fisherman tribes of the interior of India were identified with the Nishada Kingdom described in the Mahabharata. Panchanan Mitra (1923) following Vincenzo Giuffrida-Ruggeri (1913) recognises a Pre-Dravidian Australo-Veddaic stratum in India.

Alternatively, the Dravidians themselves have been claimed as originally of Australo-Melanesian stock, a view held by Biraja Sankar Guha among others.

South Indian tribes specifically described as having Australo-Melanesian affinities include the Oraon, Munda, Santal, Bhil, Gondi, the Kadars of Kerala, the Kurumba and Irula of the Nilgiris, the Paniyans of Malabar, the Uralis, Kannikars, Muthuvan and Chenchus.

In 1953, the Australoid race were believed to be part of the "Archaic Caucasoid race", along with Ainus, Dravidians and Veddas.

== Criticism based on modern genetics ==
After discussing various criteria used in biology to define subspecies or races, Alan R. Templeton concludes in 2016: "[T]he answer to the question whether races exist in humans is clear and unambiguous: no."

The Pan-Asian genome project concluded that Negrito populations in Malaysia and the Negrito populations in the Philippines were more closely related to non-Negrito local populations, rather than to each other, highlighting the non-existence of a distinct Australo-Melanesian grouping.

== See also ==
- Austronesian peoples
- Orang Asli
