= Batek =

Batek may refer to:

- Batek people, an ethnic group of peninsular Malaysia
- Batek language, an Austroasiatic language spoken by the Batek people
- Batik, an Indonesian technique of wax-resist dyeing, sometimes spelled "batek" during the Dutch colonial period
- Bitruncated 8-orthoplex, a geometric object, also known by the abbreviation "batek"
- Batek, a form of Philippine tattoo among the Kalinga people, part of the Intangible Cultural Heritage of the Philippines

People with the surname Batek include:

- Petr Batěk (born 1970), Czech rower
- Dariusz Batek (born 1986), Polish cyclist
