= Jahai people =

Indigenous people of the Siamo-Malay Peninsula

Jahai people Jehai
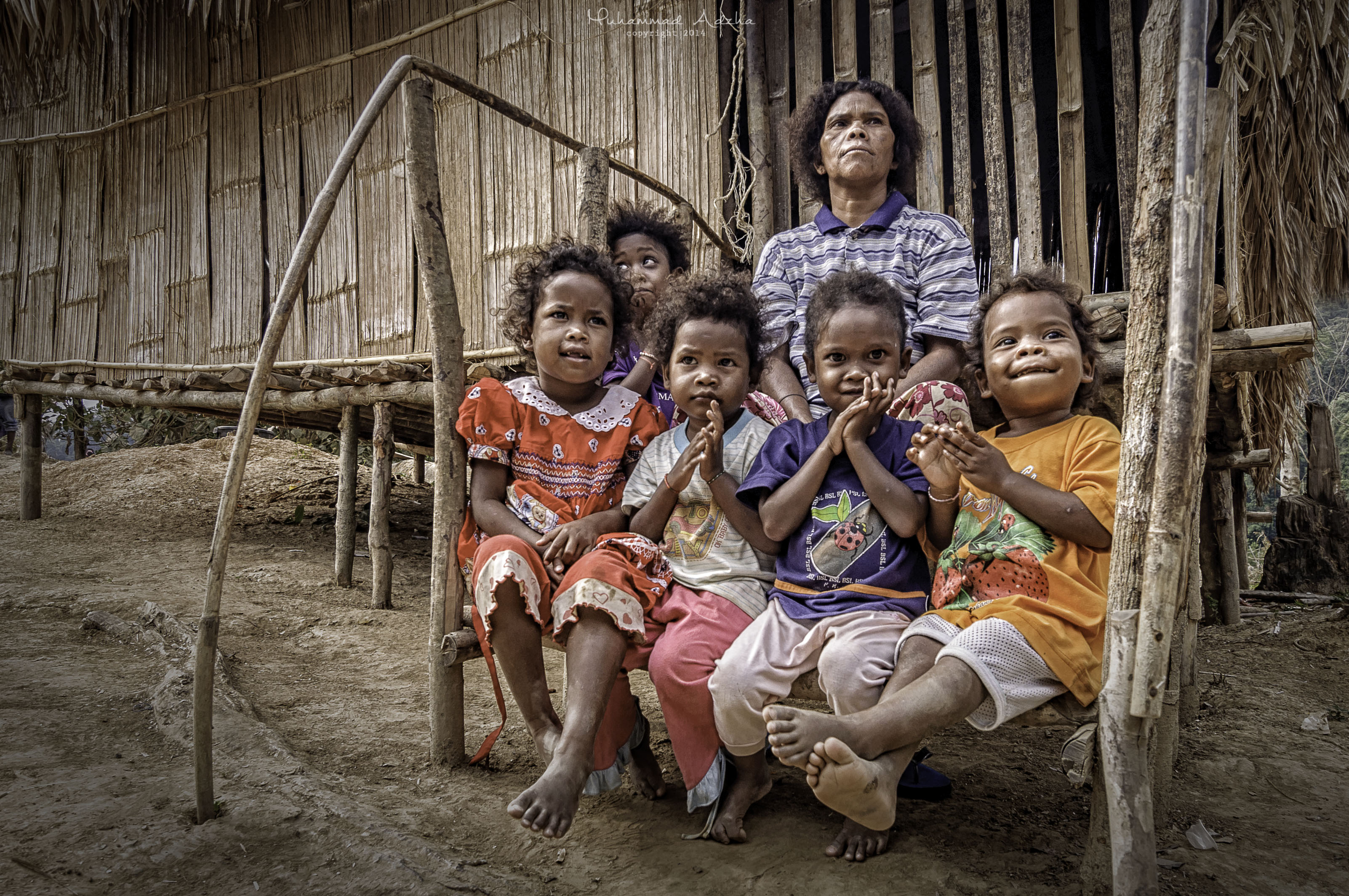
- A Jahai community in Royal Belum State Park, Perak, Malaysia.

Regions with significant populations
- Malay Peninsula
- Malaysia (Perak and Kelantan): 2,326 (2010)
- Thailand: 200

Languages
- Jahai language, Malay language

Religion
- Ethnic religion (predominantly), Islam, Christianity

Related ethnic groups
- Semang (Batek people, Lanoh people), Negritos (Maniq people, Philippine Negritos, Andamanese)

The Jahai or Jehai people are an indigenous people (Orang Asli) of the Semang people group found in Perak and Kelantan, Malaysia and parts of Thailand. They are hunter-gatherers and they occasionally practice swidden agriculture.

The Jahai people believe in a religious system with Karei (pronounced "Karεy") as a supernatural force that oversees their actions and behaviours. In order to avoid attracting Karei's attention negatively, there are taboos and avoidance rules to follow. They believe Karei can be scared away or attracted to by various odors depending on Karei's preferences, for example, the unpleasant smell of a burnt crayfish. Therefore this led to a rich odor lexicon in the Jahai language, a trait also shared among the Maniq people in Thailand.

The Jahai people, who are traditionally nomadic, live in permanent settlements in parts of the Royal Belum State Park as part of the tourist attraction. They lived in isolation, and most likely lacking of infrastructure such as roads, schools, health services, and so on. This resulted in exhaustion of resources. The mortality rate of the Jahai people in villages along the Kejar River was as high as 50% in children due to serawan, a mystery illness which caused the population there to dwindle from 600 to 400.

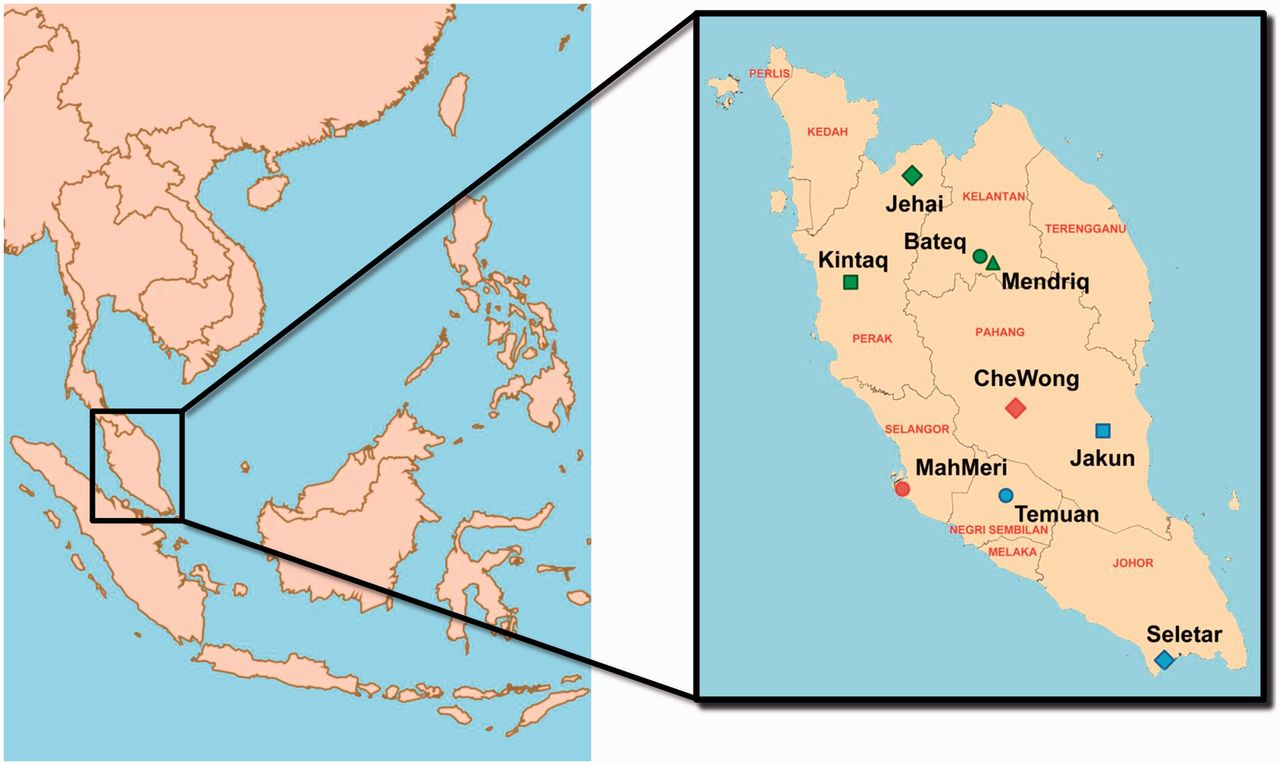
Geographical location of Jahai people (located in Perak near the Kelantan borders) and other Orang Asli communities in Peninsular Malaysia.

The population dynamics of the Jahai people in Malaysia are as the following:-

Year	1960	1965	1969	1974	1980	1993	1996	2000	2003	2004	2010
Population	621	546	702	769	740	1,049	1,049	1,244	1,843	1,843	2,326

Other settlements of the Jahai people in Malaysia are:-

- RPS Air Banun, Gerik, Perak
- Sungai Rual, Jeli District, Kelantan
