= Tanum =

Tanum may refer to:

- Tanum Municipality in Sweden
- Tanum, Norway in Bærum, Norway
- Tanum (company), a Norwegian bookstore chain owned by Egmont
- Mintil language of Malaysia, also called Tanum or Tanɨm
- Tanum River of Malaysia
