= Semang =

Indigenous ethnic group in Malaysia and Thailand

Sakai / Pangan / Ngò' Pa
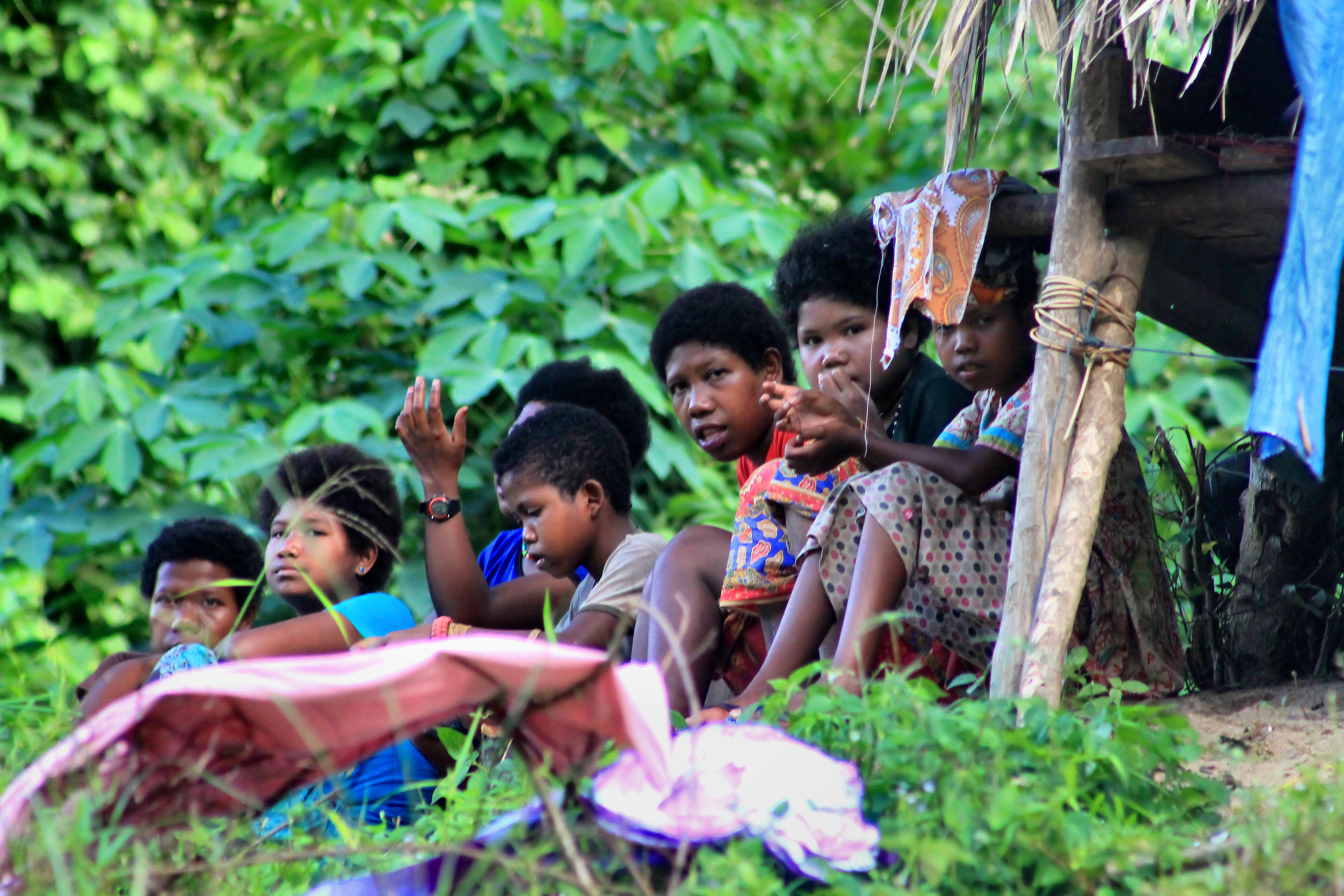
- A Batek family in Kuala Tahan, Pahang, Malaysia

Total population
- Approximately 4,800

Regions with significant populations
- Malay Peninsula
- Malaysia: Approximately 2,000–3,000
- Thailand: 300

Languages
- Jedek, Batek, Lanoh, Jahai, Mendriq, Mintil, Kensiu, Kintaq, Ten'edn, Thai, Malay, English

Religion
- Animism and significant adherents of Christianity, Islam, Buddhism or Hinduism

Related ethnic groups
- Other Orang Asli, Maniq, Andamanese

Semang is one of the three groupings of Orang Asli in the Malay Peninsula. The term is used to group those Orang Asli who were perceived as to fall under the broader obsolete racial-category of 'Negrito'. The Semang identity is not traditionally recognised by them and instead the peoples labelled with it have historically identified with their individual group; Kensiu, Kintaq, Lanoh, Jahai, Mendriq and Batek. They live in mountainous and isolated forest regions of Perak, Pahang, Kelantan and Kedah of Malaysia and the southern provinces of Thailand.

They have been recorded since before the 3rd century. They are ethnologically described as nomadic hunter-gatherers.

The Semang are grouped together with other Orang Asli groups, a diverse grouping of several distinct hunter-gatherer populations. Historically they preferred to trade with the local population. For more than one thousand years, some of the Semang people remained in isolation while others were either subjected to slave raids or forced to pay tribute to Southeast Asian rulers.

== Name and status ==
In Malaysia, the term Semang (Orang Semang in Malay) is used to refer to the hunter-gatherers, that are referred to more generically as Negrito, Spanish for 'little negro'. In the past, eastern groups of Semang have been called Pangan. Semang are referred to as Sakai in Thailand, although this term is considered to be derogatory in Malaysia.

The etymology of the word Semang has been a matter of debate. While early researchers like Skeat and Blagden noted it had "never been satisfactorily explained," the ethnographer Paul Schebesta speculated that it originated from the Lanoh word sema', meaning "human". According to this theory, the word was misheard by Perak Malays, who changed the final glottal stop to the velar nasal [ŋ], resulting in "Semang".

In Malaysia, the Semang are one of three groups that are considered to be Orang Asli, the hunter-gatherer people of the Peninsula. The other two groups are the Senoi and the Proto-Malay (Aboriginal Malay). The Semang have six sub-groups: Kensiu, Kintaq, Lanoh, Jahai, Mendriq and Batek. The Malaysian federal government has designated the Department of Orang Asli Development (Jabatan Kemajuan Orang Asli, JAKOA) as the agency responsible for integrating the Orang Asli into the wider Malaysian society.

The three category division of the indigenous population was inherited by the Malaysian government from the British administration of the colonial era. It is based on racial concepts, according to which the Negrito were seen as the most primitive race leading the vagrant way of life of hunter-gatherers. The Senoi were considered more developed, and the Proto-Malay were placed at almost the same level with the Malaysian Malay Muslims.

In Thailand, the terms Semang and Orang Asli are replaced by the terms Sakai or Ngopa (Ngò 'Pa or Ngoh Paa, which literally means 'curly/frizzy (haired) people'). The first term is derogatory in Malaysia, with the connotation of savages, subjects or slaves. The Semang have had a degree of patronage from the royal family of Thailand.

== Physical features ==
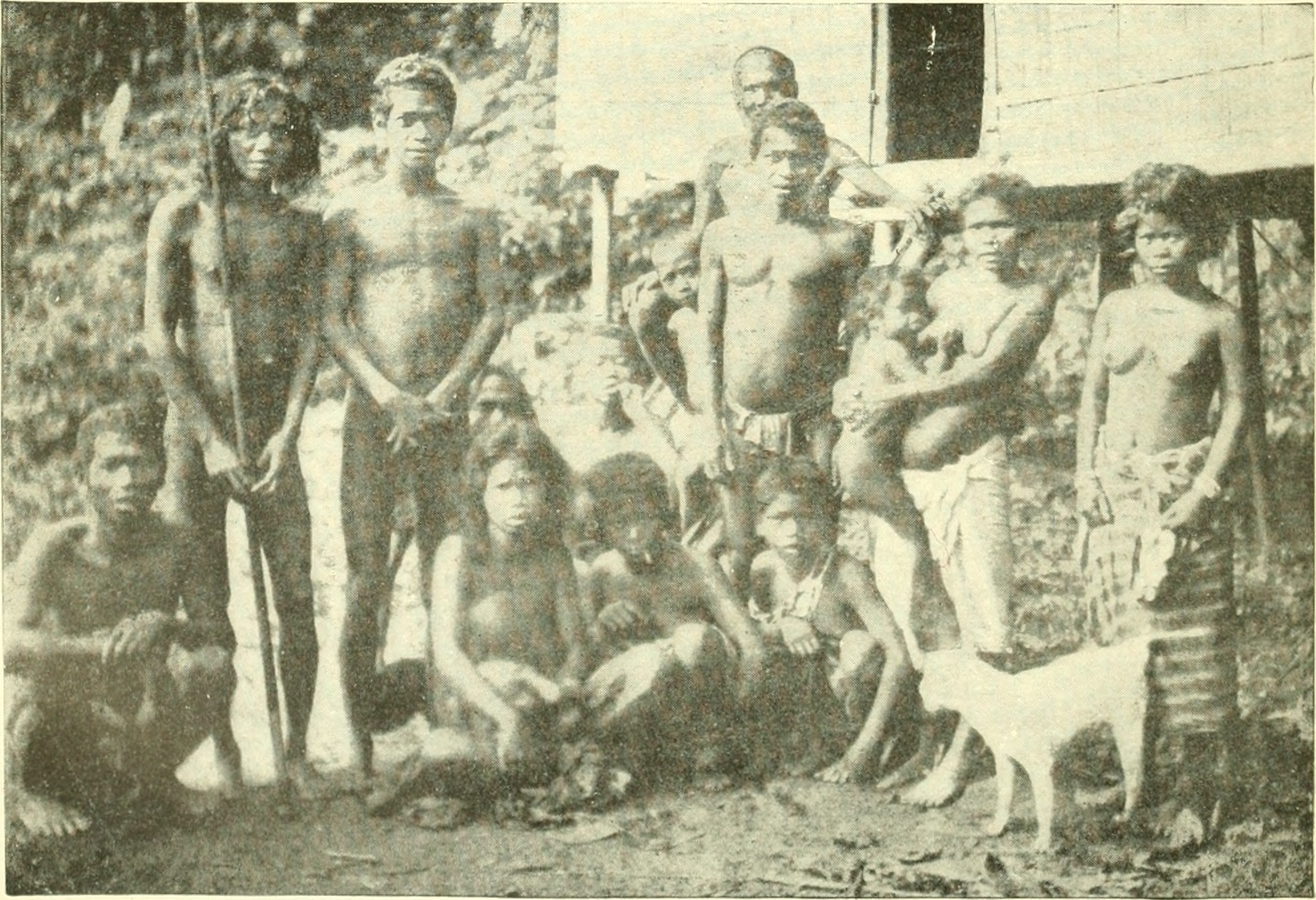
A Semang group in Malaya, 1846.

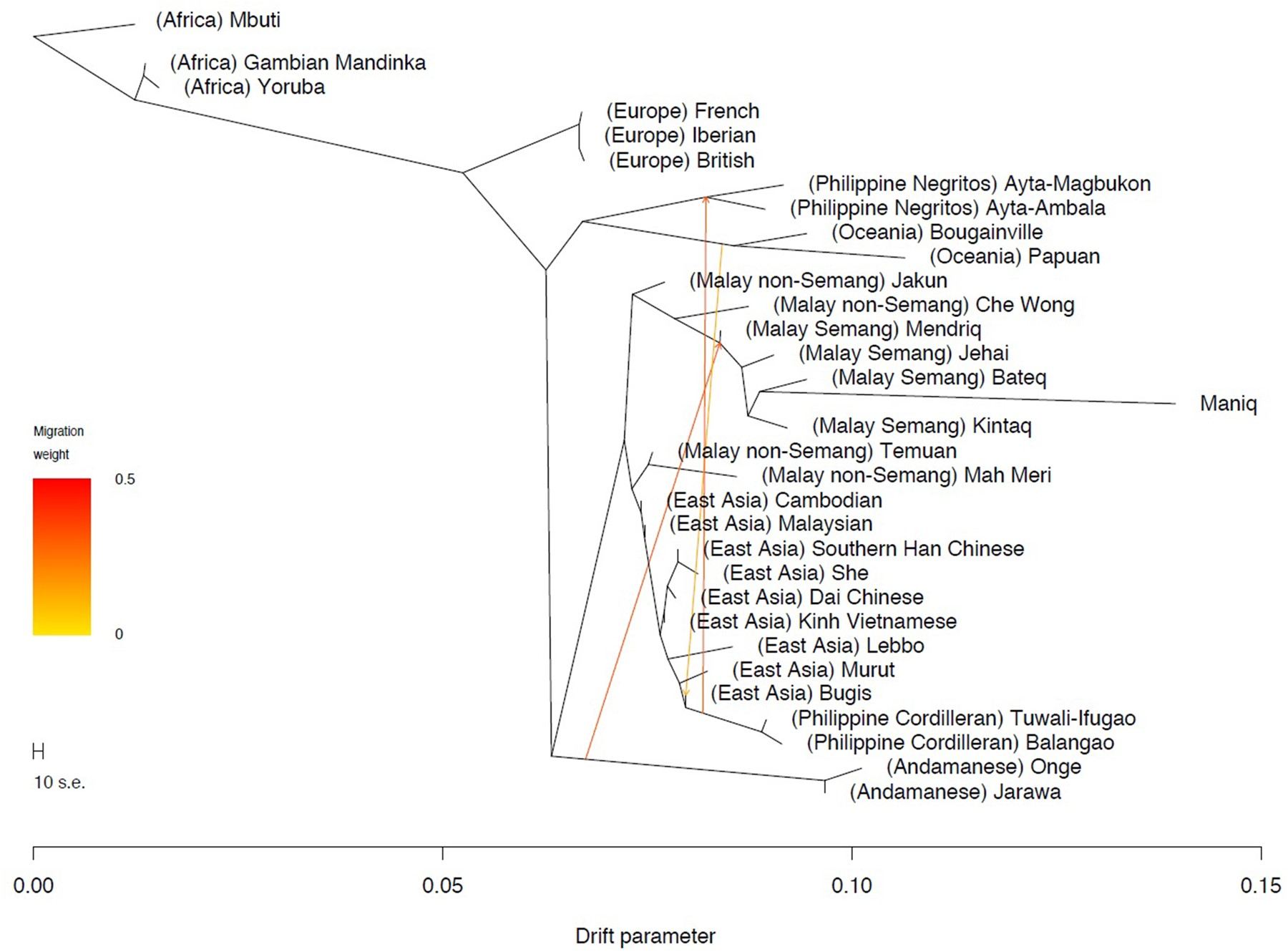
Population genomic "TreeMix" analysis of Semang and closely related populations (eg. East Asians and Andamanese peoples).

They have dark skin, often curly-hair and Asiatic facial characteristics, and are stockily built.

== Ethnic groups ==
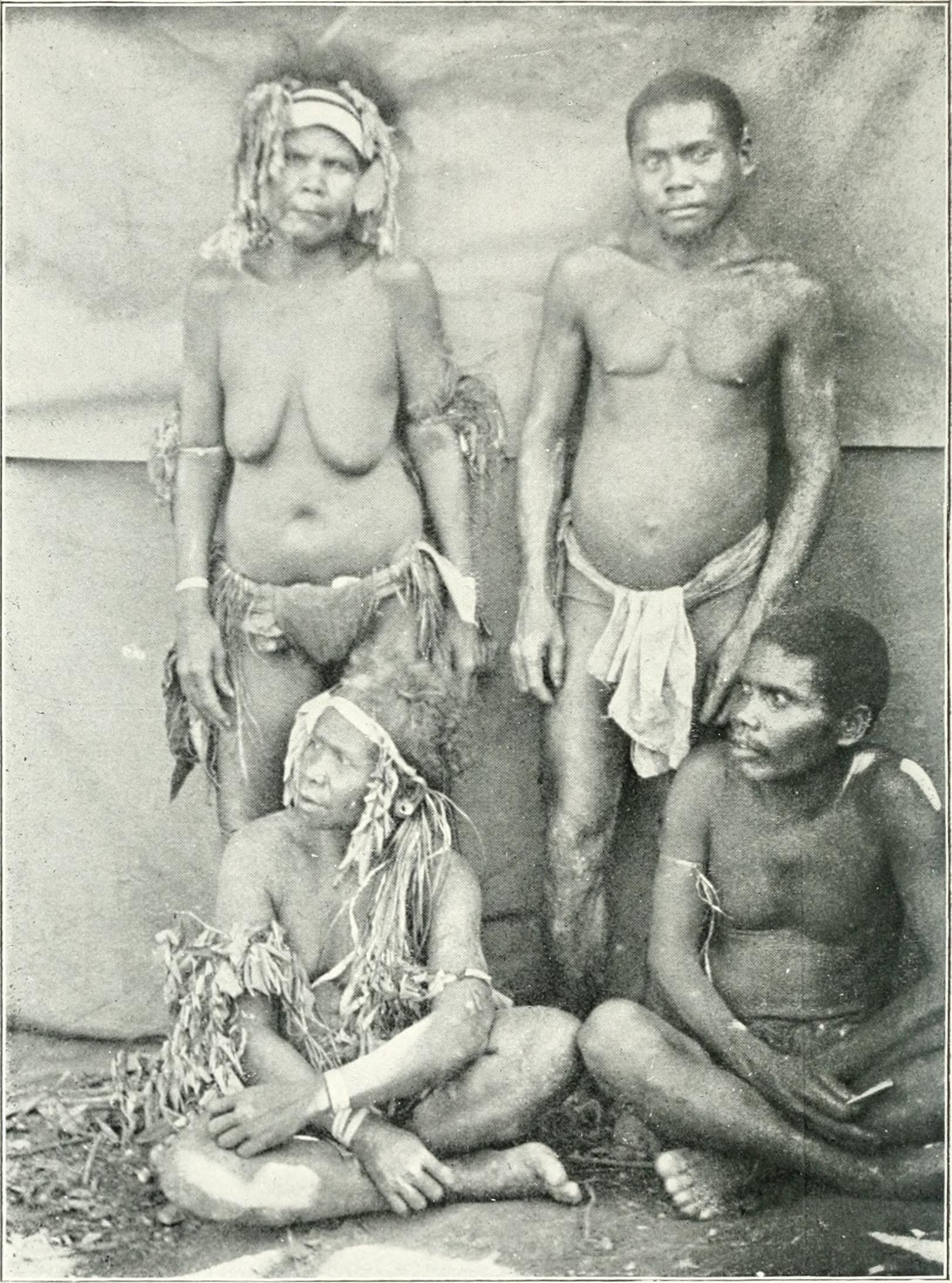
A Semang group in traditional dancing attire in Kuala Sam, Kelantan, 1906.

The Semang do not have a sense of common ethnic identity. The term Semang is applied on them from an outside view, however the Semang refer to themselves only with their tribes names.

In total there are at least ten tribes that are classified as Semang in Malaysia (not all of them are officially recognized by the Malaysian government):-

- Kensiu live in the northern part of Kedah, near the borders with Thailand. Most of them settled in the district village, Kampung Lubuk-Legong, which is in Baling District, Kedah.
- Kintaq also have only one village, which is located near the city Gerik in Hulu Perak District, Perak. Traditionally they wandered around Klian Intan in Hulu Perak District and near Baling District in Kedah.
- Lanoh located in three villages situated in the Hulu Perak District in the northwest of Perak near Gerik. Among these people there are also distinct tribal groups such as the Lanoh Yir (probably nomadic), Lanoh Jengjeng (semi-settled) and possibly others.
  - Semnam are not included in the official list of JAKOA, however they are grouped with the Lanoh. They live at the Ayer Bal River near Kampung Kuala Kenering in the Hulu Perak District, west of Gerik.
  - Sabub'n are also grouped together with the Lanoh. The remnants of this nearly extinct tribe, along with other Lanoh groups, live near Lenggong and Gerik in Hulu Perak District.
- Jahai live in the mountains separating the states of Perak and Kelantan, at south of the borders of Thailand. This is the only mountain that the Semang inhabit. Their settlements are mainly along rivers or near lakes. In Perak they live along rivers such as Sungai Banun, Sungai Tiang and near Temenggor Lake in the Hulu Perak District. In Kelantan, the Jahai are concentrated along rivers namely Sungai Rual and Sungai Jeli in Jeli District.
- Mendriq live in several villages along the middle reaches of the Kelantan River in the remotes of Gua Musang District in the southern state of Kelantan.
- Batek:-
  - Bateg Deq live mostly at the Aring River in southern Kelantan, partly in the neighbouring districts of Terengganu and Pahang. JAKOA does not distinguish between different Batek groups.
  - Bateg Nong, another Batek group, live in the Jerantut District of northern Pahang. In total, there are 7 villages in the Pahang state, of which 5 of them are in the Lipis District and the other 2 are in Jerantut District; while in Kelantan there are 4 hamlet villages in the Gua Musang District.
  - Mintil or "Mayah" live along the riverbanks of Sungai Tanum near Chegar Perah in north-central of Lipis District, Pahang. Officially, they are recognized as part of the Batek.

A few smaller groups of Semang live in the southern provinces of Thailand. These nomadic groups are mentioned under the names such as Tonga, Mos, Chong and Ten'en. They call themselves Mani, but their linguistic affiliation remains uncertain.

Because of the small number of some of these Semang groups, they are on the verge of disappearance.

== Settlement areas ==
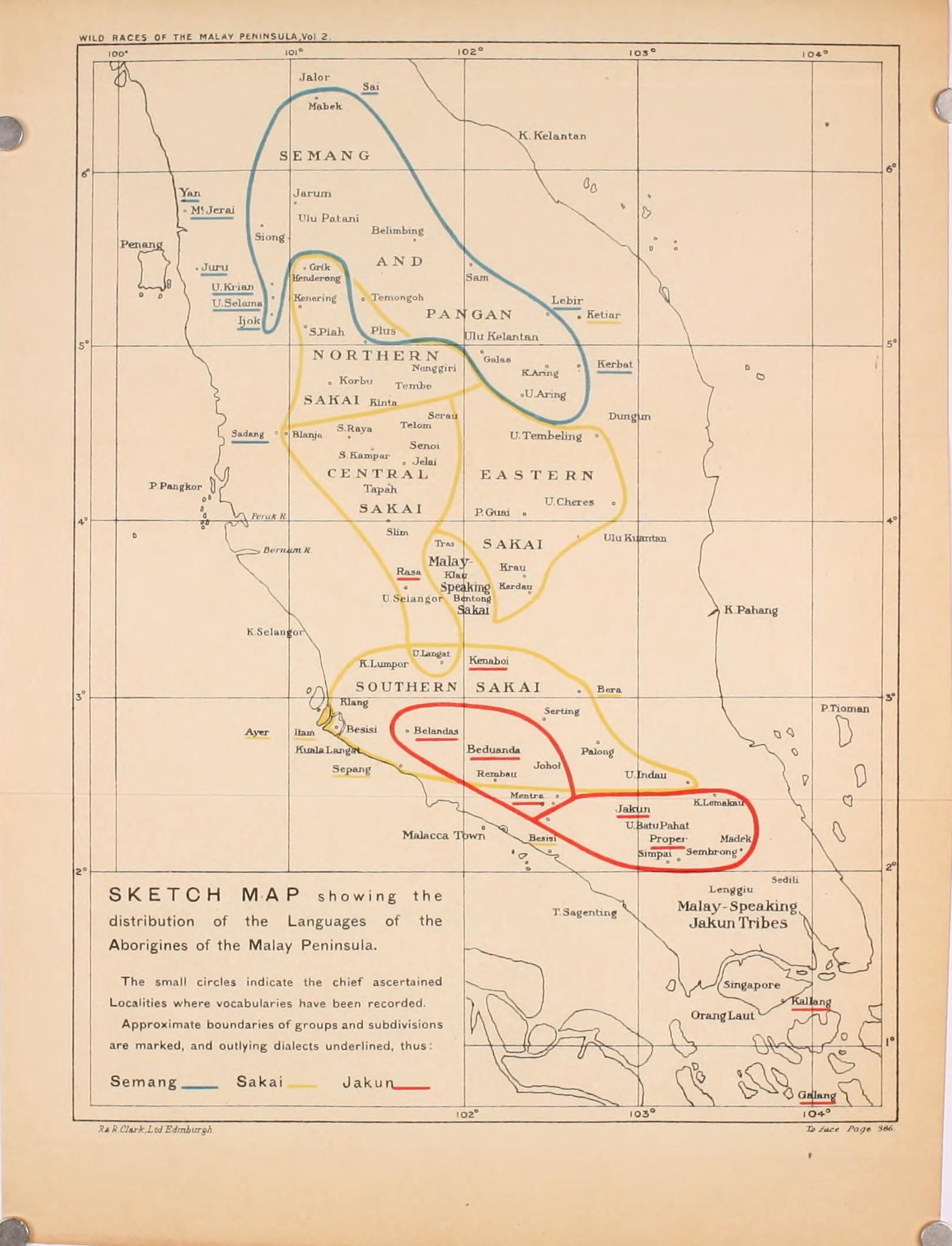
A map from Pagan Races of the Malay Peninsula (1906). Blue = Semang; yellow = Sakai tribe; red = Jakun.

The Semang live mainly in the more isolated lowlands and foothills within the primary and secondary wet tropical jungles of the northern Malay Peninsula. Only the Jahai live at higher altitudes.

In the past, the territory of the Semang settlement was wider, but neighbouring ethnic groups pushed them into hard-to-reach areas. Kensiu now live in the northeast of Kedah, the Kintaq of which are settled in the adjoining areas of Kedah and Perak, the Jahai are in the northeast of Perak and in west of Kelantan, the Lanoh in the northeast of Perak, in the north-central Perak, the Mendriq in the south-east of Kelantan, and the Batek in the northwestern of Terengganu, northeastern of Pahang and southern Kelantan. One former group that is now extinct is the coastal Semang of Kedah, Penang and Perak (known as 'Semang Bakau' or Low Country Semang).

A significant part of these tribes live in permanent settlements, but traditionally separate groups of different time periods go into the jungle for the harvesting of jungle produce. Most often of such cases take place during the end of the fall on the maturation of wild fruit season. Because of this tradition, they are often designated as nomads, although the Semang in Malaysia at present are no longer leading a nomadic way of life.

Today, among the Semang; as part of the Orang Asli group, they also live in urban areas of Malaysia, mixed with members of other ethnic groups.

Several isolated Semang groups reside in the jungles of the southern provinces of Thailand. So far in the north, there are two groups in Trang Province and one in Phatthalung Province live for several kilometers apart from each other. For many kilometers, in the southern direction, there is another very small group of Semang in the southern part of the Satun Province, near the Malaysian border.

The remaining groups of Thai Semang can be found living in the Yala Province. In the upper part of the valley, in the Than To District of this province; about 2 km from the Thai-Malaysian border, there is a village in which is the only settled Semang group that lives in Thailand. There is another group of nomad Semang who live along the border with Malaysia in the Yala Province. Both nomadic and settled groups maintain close contacts with Malaysia. The border here has only political significance, and nothing prevents the Semang from freely crossing it.

The closest neighbours of the Semang are the Malay people. This applies not only to Malaysian Semang but also to groups living in Thailand. The extreme south of this country is ethnically predominantly Malay, although the Malay people there are officially called Thai Muslims because of Thaification.

== Population ==
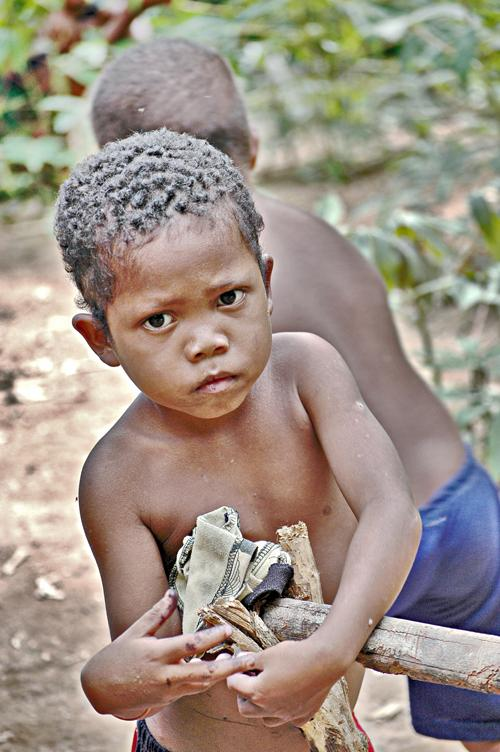
A Batek child, Malaysia.

Dynamics of the Semang population after the declaration of independence of Malaysia:-

Year	1960	1965	1969	1974	1980	1996	2000	2003	2010
Kensiu	126	76	98	101	130	224	254	232	280
Kintaq	256	76	122	103	103	235	150	157	234
Lanoh	142	142	264	302	224	359	173	350	390
Jahai	621	546	702	769	740	1,049	1,244	1,843	2,326
Mendriq	106	94	118	121	144	145	167	164	253
Batek	530	339	501	585	720	960	1,519	1,255	1,359
Total	1,781	1,273	1,805	1,981	2,061	2,972	3,507	4,001	4,842

Distribution of Orang Asli subgroups in Malaysia by states (1996):-

	Kedah	Perak	Kelantan	Terengganu	Pahang	Total
Kensiu	180	30	14			224
Kintaq		227	8			235
Lanoh		359				359
Jahai		740	309			1,049
Mendriq			131		14	145
Batek			247	55	658	960
Total	180	1,356	709	55	672	2,972

The population of Semang in Thailand was estimated at 240 people (2010).

== Language ==
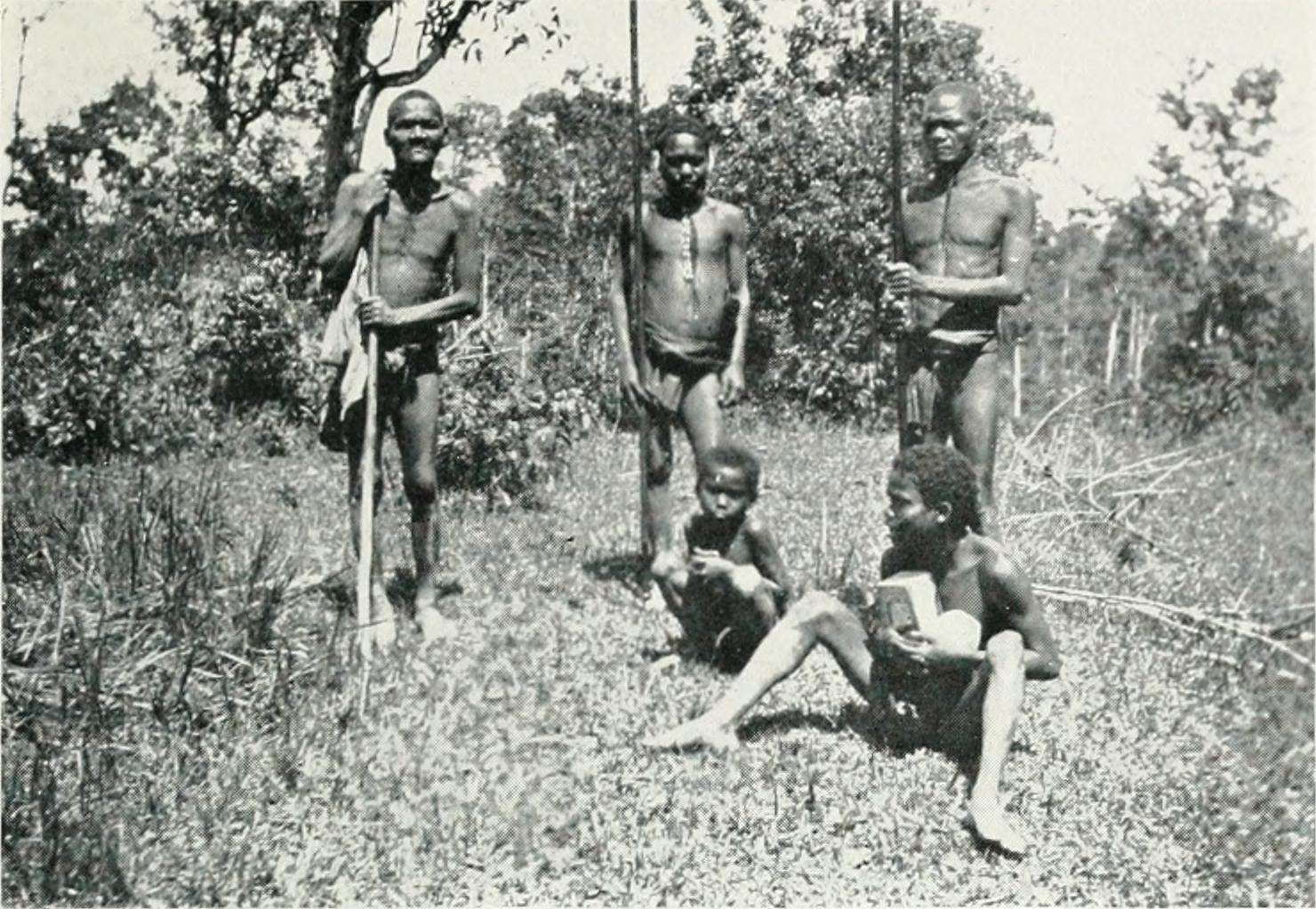
Semang from Gerik or Janing, Perak, 1906.

Semang languages belonged to the Aslian branch of the Austroasiatic languages. These languages are also spoken by the neighbouring Senoi. Austroasiatic languages, spoken by Khmer or Vietnamese, were adopted by various other hunter-gatherer groups during the Neolithic and pre-Neolithic period. Later, Kra-Dai and Austronesian languages partially replaced Austroasiatic and other languages.

It is believed that Aslian languages were brought to the Malay Peninsula from the north, from the territory of modern Thailand. The ancestors of the Semang lived on the peninsula long before the arrival of Austroasiatic. It is clear that they would have once spoken other, unknown, languages. However, no direct lexical evidence of this has yet been obtained.

Aslian languages are divided into four main divisions: the Northern Aslian languages, Central Aslian languages, Southern Aslian languages and the Jah Hut language, which occupies a separate position.

Among Semang in Malaysia, there are further extended languages and dialects such as Kensiu language, Kentaq Bong dialect, Kintaq Nakil dialect, Jahai language, Minriq language, Bateg Deq language, Mintil language, Bateg Nong language, Semnam language, Sabüm language, Lanoh Yir dialect, Lanoh Jengjeng dialect. Most of them form the Northern Aslian languages group of the Aslian languages, only the languages of the Lanoh language (with the dialects of its subfamilies and Semnam language close to it) belong to the Central Aslian languages group. Very few Semang languages have been studied in Thailand, most likely in Kensiu language or Jahai language.

A characteristic feature of the Semang languages is that they do not have clear boundaries. This is a typical phenomenon for languages whose carriers are mostly small nomadic groups, of whom the usual situation is when representatives of different ethnic groups live together in the same temporary camp settlement. Thus, all the Northern Aslian languages together form a large continuous network of languages, interconnected by constant contacts. A similar but smaller network form the languages of the Lanoh language.

Not all Semang languages have survived to this day, some of the dialects are already completely extinct. This danger also threatens some of the existing dialects, including Sabüm language, Semnam language and Mintil language. At the same time, the situation with most Semang languages remains stable; regardless of the small number of their speakers, their language are not threaten with disappearance.

Most Semang, in addition to their own language, also speak Malay. There are also many Malay loanwords in all Semang languages. In addition, some Aslian languages contain many loanwords from each other. Another source of loanwords is the Thai language, which is noticeably predominantly in the Kensiu language, in the north of the peninsula. In Thailand, most of the settled Semang also speak Thai. However, in some rare cases, some or a few Semang can also speak English since that Malaysia was ruled by the British from 1867–1957.

== History ==
The Semang are suggested to be descended from the people of the pre-Neolithic Hoabinhian culture, which was distributed in Southeast Asia from contemporary Vietnam, to the north eastern part of Sumatra in the 9th-3rd millennium BC. These Hoabinhians were hunter-gatherers and may also have practiced some forms of plant cultivation. While the Upper Paleolithic origins of the Hoabinhians are unknown, the analysis of sampled genomes from Holocene Hoabinhian individuals has shown that they shared a common ancestor with East Asians and (probably more remotely) with Australopapuan populations, as part of the Ancient East Eurasian (Eastern non-African) ancestral lineage which gave rise to both East Asian and Oceanian lineages.

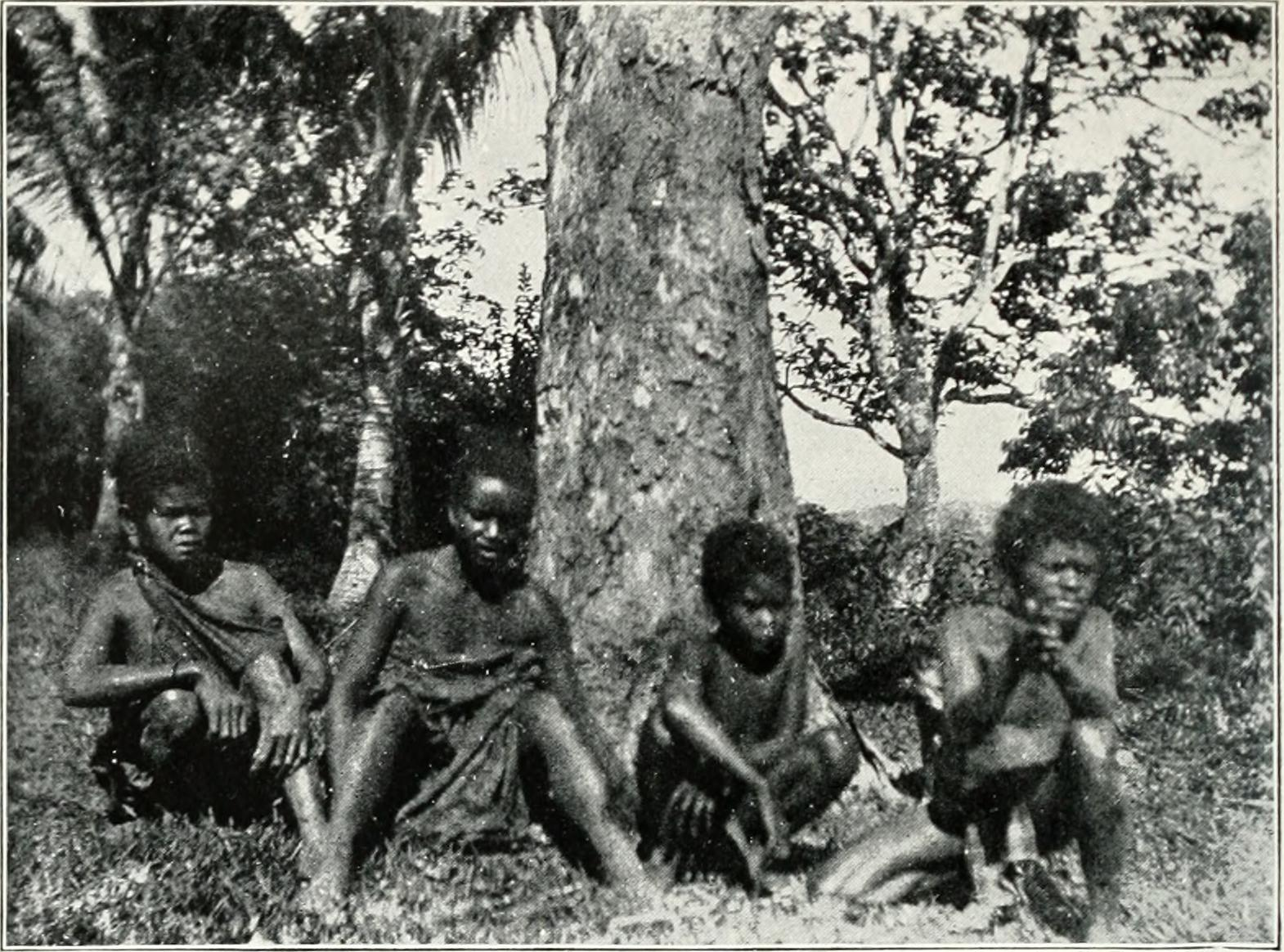
A group of Semangs on the border of Reman and Kedah, 1906

Approximately 4,000 years ago, the practice of Slash-and-burn farming came to the Malay Peninsula, but nomadic hunting and harvesting continued to exist. New Austroasiatic-speaking migrants also brought to the peninsula Aslian languages, which evolved into modern Senoic languages and Semang languages. It is believed that the ancestors of the Senoi became farmers, and the ancestors of the Semang continued to engage in harvesting, sometimes supplementing it with trade and agriculture. A stable social tradition, which made it impossible for marriages between these groups, contributed to the delineation of these two racial types.

After 500 BC, maritime trade was already developed and the Malay Peninsula became a crossroads that bound India with China. On the coast there are settlements, some of them subsequently turned into large ports with permanent populations, consisting of foreign traders who maintained constant ties with China, India, the Middle East, and the Mediterranean. The Semang become suppliers of jungle produce, which was in high demand in other countries such as aromatic woods, camphor, rubber, rattan, rhino horns, elephant tusks, gold, tin and so on. They also played the role of jungle guardians.

The Malay Srivijaya empire came in contact with the Negrito. In the year 724 AD, two Negrito pygmies were among the tribute gifts to Malay rulers. Negrito pygmies from the southern forests were enslaved and exploited until modern times.

At the end of the 14th century, on the coast of the Strait of Malacca, the first trading settlements were founded by Malay settlers from Sumatra. The main center was Malacca. At the beginning of the 15th century, the ruler of Malacca embraced Islam. Malay settlers began to slowly move upstream deeper into the peninsula, while some were subjugated to the Malays, most of the Orang Asli retreated into the interior regions.

During the early years of contact, the Semang peacefully interacted and traded with the Malays, but with the strengthening of the Malay states, the relationship between them began to deteriorate. In the 18th and 19th centuries, the Semang and other indigenous groups became slave trade victims of Batak and Rawa raiders. In response to attempts to capture slaves, the Semang developed a tactic of avoiding contact with outsiders. As a way of preserving their autonomy, they would immediately destroy their shelters if an outsider intruded and they would remained hidden or "closed" in the jungle.

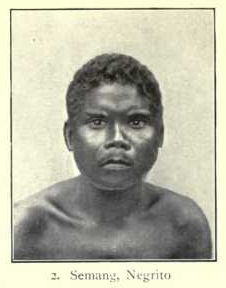
A Semang man, 1899.

The more the Semang were isolated from the surrounding peoples, the more surprising they were perceived by others. Many peoples of Southeast Asia considered the jungle as home to magical creatures, among those that assented are the Negritos. These people were endowed with magical qualities, and with various legends associated with fairy tales. Among the Malaysian sultans and rulers of the southern provinces of Thailand, it was once regarded as prestigious to keep Negritos in their yards as part of collections of amusing jungle beings.

In the first decade of the twentieth century, the king of Thailand, King Chulalongkorn (Rama V) visited the southern regions of his country and met with the Semang. In 1906, an orphan Semang boy named Khanung was sent to the royal court, where he was perceived as the adoptive son of the ruler. From this event, it has led to the patronage of the Semang by the royal court.

The British colonial government banned slavery at the end of the nineteenth century and introduced a protection policy for the Orang Asli. The British perceived the indigenous people as noble savages, who lead an idealized and romantic existence and need protection from the devastating actions of modern life.

Attention to the aborigines drew only during the Malayan Emergency in Malaysia in the 1950s. In order to bring them to the government's side in the confrontation against the communist rebels, a special department was established, the Department of Orang Asli Affairs (Jabatan Hal Ehwal Orang Asli, JHEOA); which was to provide education, health and economic development of the Orang Asli. A comprehensive control of indigenous communities was then introduced. Similar actions on the neutralization of the Negritos, albeit on a smaller scale, were also carried out by the Thai government in response to the transfer of communist soldiers into Thailand's territory.

The proclamation of Malaysia's independence in 1957 and the cessation of the Malayan Emergency in 1961 did not bring about significant changes in the state's policy towards the Orang Asli. In the 1970s, the Department of Orang Asli Affairs began to organize for the Semang settlements, which were meant to relocate several nomadic groups. Approximately by the end of 1980, the widespread development of jungle harvesting and the replacement of jungles for plantations, it has severely damaged the lives of most tribes of the Semang.

Much of the Kintaq, Jahai, Batek and Lanoh people now live in villages built by the state, surrounded by secondary jungles and plantations, as well as villages whose populations do not belong to the Orang Asli. They were forced to give up their livelihood and to some extent became accustomed to small farming.

In 1966 (according to some sources, 1973), in order to improve their lives, a Sakai Village was established in Thailand. The state laid a rubber plantation for them. In the early 1990s, it was decided to turn this village into a tourist centre, where the Semang in a theatrical form began to demonstrate to tourists features of their traditional way of life.

== Beliefs ==
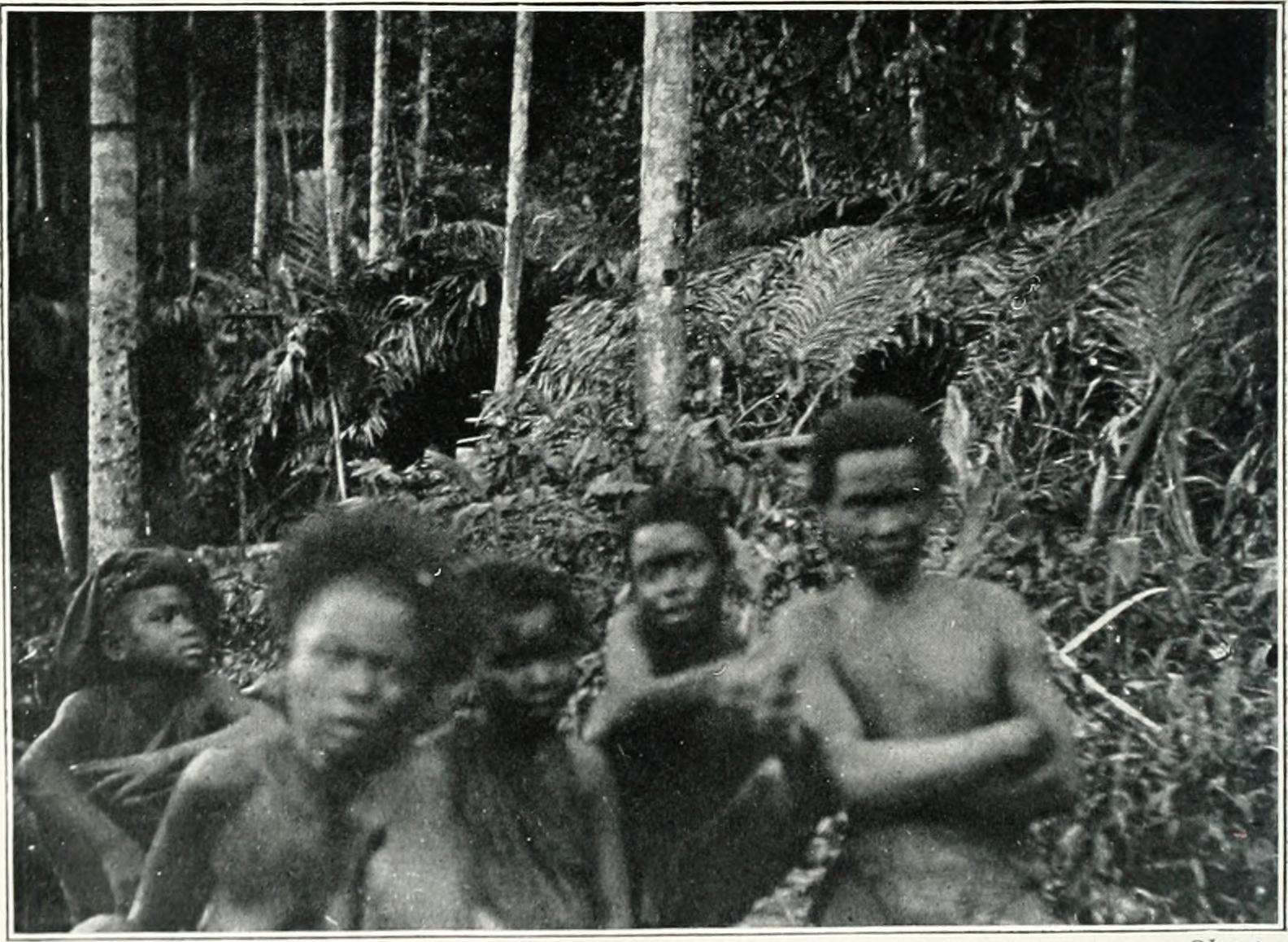
A group of Semang at Siong, Baling District, Kedah, 1906.

In terms of religion, the Semang are animists. They believe that not only people, but all natural objects have souls.

The land of the Semang are imagined in the form of a disk that lies on a huge snake or turtle floating underground. The earth is connected with the sky with one or several stone pillars. The world is filled with numerous immortal supernatural beings, spirits living on the sky, in stone pillars and underground. Skyline is a paradise filled with flowers and fruit trees. Supernatural beings have created rain forests to meet the needs of people on earth. Some of them in the past lived on the ground as ordinary people and now from time to time come back here, appearing in people in dreams.

Most supernatural beings have no names, they are often associated with certain natural phenomena or objects, such as wind or fruit trees. Others have their names and individual attributes. Most of the Semang are afraid of three natural phenomena; thunder, floods and storms. The main deity in them is the god of thunder Karey. He is not loved and evokes great fear, he is considered cruel and evil. Karey, according to local beliefs, carries out an important moral function, imposing punishment on violators of taboo. It can cause death, injury or illness through lightning strikes or wildlife attacks.

In each group there is a shaman called a hala. He acts as an intermediary between the visible world of people and the invisible world of spirits. Shamans perform rituals and magic rites, practice magic, anticipate the future, cure illnesses, and define a safe place for camp placement. Treatment of diseases is carried out using different herbs and magic spells. Semang believe that their shamans in a state of trance communicate with supernatural beings, can express them gratitude, as well as learn from them the way to treat a serious illness.

Shamans can be both men and women. There are big and small halas. Small halas are ordinary mortals who know some ways of treating. For the treatment of diseases, they use certain songs, massage, herbal medicine and spells. Sometimes during the healing ceremony, they are part of the trance. Great halas, according to the Semang, are people with supernatural abilities. Not only do they communicate with spirits through dreams or trance, they themselves are supernatural beings, for example, they can turn into tigers and drive wildlife away from people. Big and small halas get their knowledge from the spirits through dreams or from another hala. The best way is to wait on the grave of the deceased shaman until he appears in the likeness of the tiger, and then he will turn to the person and begin to teach the beginner.

Special rites accompany important events in life, such as birth, disease, death, there are also various rituals of economic orientation. When rituals are carried out, animist symbols are used.

The Malaysian government is pursuing a policy of conversion of the Orang Asli to Islam. A certain demographic of the Semang was considered Muslim by the end of the 20th century. The statistics are as follows:-

	Кensiu	Кintaq	Jahai	Lanoh	Меndriq	Batek
Muslims Negritos (1997)	108	67	292	94	61	710
Total population (1996)	224	235	1 049	359	145	960

== Culture ==
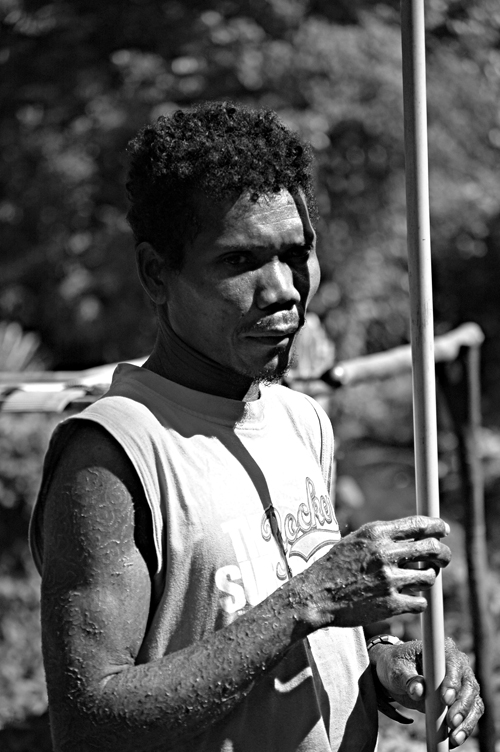
A Batek man is seen with scarification on his arms.

Scarification is practised. Young boys and girls are scarified in a simple ritual to mark the end of their adolescence. The finely serrated edge of a sugarcane leaf is drawn across the skin, then charcoal powder rubbed into the cut.

They have bamboo musical instruments, a kind of jaw harp, and a nose flute. On festive occasions, there is song and dance, both sexes decorating themselves with leaves.

The Semang bury their dead on the same day itself with the corpse wrapped in mat and the personal belonging of the deceased kept in a small bamboo rack placed over the grave. Only people of great importance, such as chiefs or great magicians are given a tree burial.

They have used Capnomancy (divination by smoke) to determine whether a camp is safe for the night.

=== Traditional way of life ===
Traditionally, the Semang have been living a vagrant lifestyle of jungle hunter-gatherers. Each group occupies a certain customary territory, which was a territorial subsistence for them. Within this territory they are constantly moving from place to place in search for new food resources. The Semang are not hunter-gatherers in the literal sense, as they constantly change their livelihood depending on what is currently beneficial for them. As soon as one source of edible resources is exhausted, they turn to another.

This way of life has been steadily maintained for a millennia due to the specific social structure of their society. Separate families in Semang community are completely autonomous; where they can gather together in temporary camps, then diverge, each in their direction, and then gather together with other families in new camps. Exogamy in such a society has an extreme level, which leads to large-scale family ties. Such model for the society ideally corresponds to the nomadic way of life and is unacceptable for the settled population. It served as a barrier that divided the populations that have been living together for a millennia.

Semang consider their customary territories free for use by all members of the local group. Western Semang recognize their human right to possess poisonous trees and perennial fruit trees that they have planted or found in the jungles. Other groups consider such trees to be free for everyone.

Claims of exclusive rights to a particular area in a dispute with other groups of Semang or with other peoples are usually not put forward and in any case are not valid. The Malaysian government does not at all recognize any rights of Semang to customary lands or resources.

Although they are commonly referred to as the inhabitants of the deep jungle areas, Semang actually occupy a transition zone between tropical jungles and agricultural districts. The resources here are very diverse and abundant. They can also collect valuable wood and maintain trade with neighbors. In the deep jungle they can only hunt small animals living among the trees, as valuable vegetation resources are practically absent from there.

In state villages, the Department of Orang Asli Development is trying to attract Semang to agriculture. On cleared jungle areas, the state organizes the planting of rubber trees, durian, rambutan, oil palms and bananas. The Semang are forced to adapt to new conditions, but agricultural activity requires long term waiting results, which contradicts their world view. At different times of the day, a group of Semang may send a whole group or individuals to harvest forest products, trade them, get hired in casual paid jobs from Malay farmers, go fishing or simply beg or live off of gifts left by visitors.

With this in mind, JAKOA provides the people with grocery kits so they do not leave their work. But, when there is a delay with the release of these rations, the Semang immediately stop agricultural activity, and some even return to live in the woods. The harvesting of jungle produce for sale still remains a priority for them, followed by work for money, settled agriculture and horticulture.

== Livelihood ==
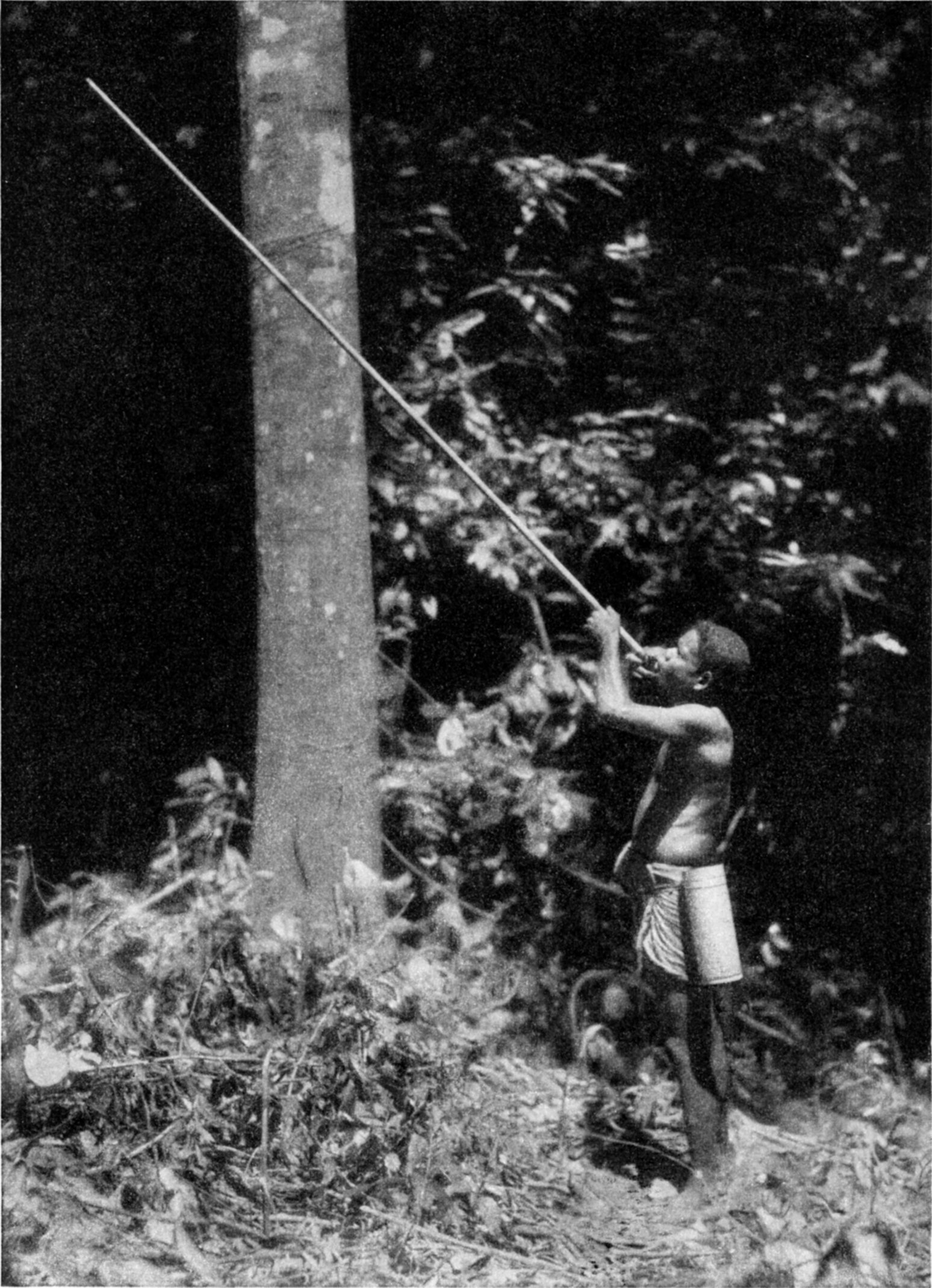
A Semang man shoots an arrow from his blowgun. The bamboo quiver at his side contains the strongly poisoned arrows. 1937.

The main livelihood of the Semang has traditionally been gathering, hunting and fishing in a wandering lifestyle. Only in the 20th century some groups, the Lanoh and Batek in particular, began to practice Slash-and-burn farming.

For daily consumption, the roots and fruits of wild plants are collected in the jungle. The major food gathered is wild yams (Dioscorea), of which at least twelve species can be found in relative abundance throughout the year. Other wild foods include bamboo shoots, nuts, seasonal fruits, mushrooms, and honey. Apart from this list, there is also a range of medicinal herbs.

Different jungle plants are used by the Semang for various purposes. Bamboo is used for housing construction, the production of blowguns, darts, fish traps, kitchen utensils, water containers, combs, mats, rafts and ritual items. From the wood, they produce handles and sheaths for knives, and cutting boards for slicing meat. Pandan is used to make mats and baskets, tree barks for baskets and also clothing, and rattan for rope, baskets, ladders and belts.

The Semang spend a lot of time and effort on harvesting jungle products intended for sale or for exchange with neighboring Malay villages. These include wild fruits, as well as rattan, rubber, wax, honey, and herbs. The most popular products are petai (Parkia speciosa), kerdas (Archidendron bubalinum), keranji (Dialium indum), jering (Archidendron jiringa) and durian (Durio pinangianus). Petai and durian are collected from August to November, kerdas during February to May, and keranji from October to January. The produce obtained are shared with everyone in the camp. Money that the Semang receive from the sale of these goods is then used to buy rice, oil, tobacco, salt, sugar and other food products, as well as clothing, fabrics, knives and other provisions.

Hunting is done with spears, rifles, and slings, but the main weapon is the blowgun, which is used to hunt small game (squirrels, monkeys, bats and birds). Guns and spears are used to hunt large animals such as wild pigs, goats, deer and tapirs. Occasionally hunting traps are set. Slingshots of wood and rubber are used, mainly by young men, to capture birds, bats, and other tree dwelling animals. Some of the Semang in the past used bows and arrows in a collective hunting group, but this practice disappeared at the beginning of the 20th century. River fish are caught using special traps made of bamboo, spears, hooks and fishing rods.

Most of the Semang groups grow a certain number of cultivated plants (Upland rice, cassava, corn, sweet potatoes, other vegetables). Primitive manual farming is practiced on small scorched areas of the jungle. The result of the harvest is the property of the family that did the planting, but after harvesting, the foods are distributed to all as a rule. Women mainly engage in harvesting and farming, and men mainly focus on hunting.

Pottery and weaving among the Semang are absent. Steel knives and axes are obtained either through trade or by the processing of steel waste from spearheads, arrows, and blades from knives. Individual specialization is practically absent, except for the religious sphere.

== Lifestyle ==
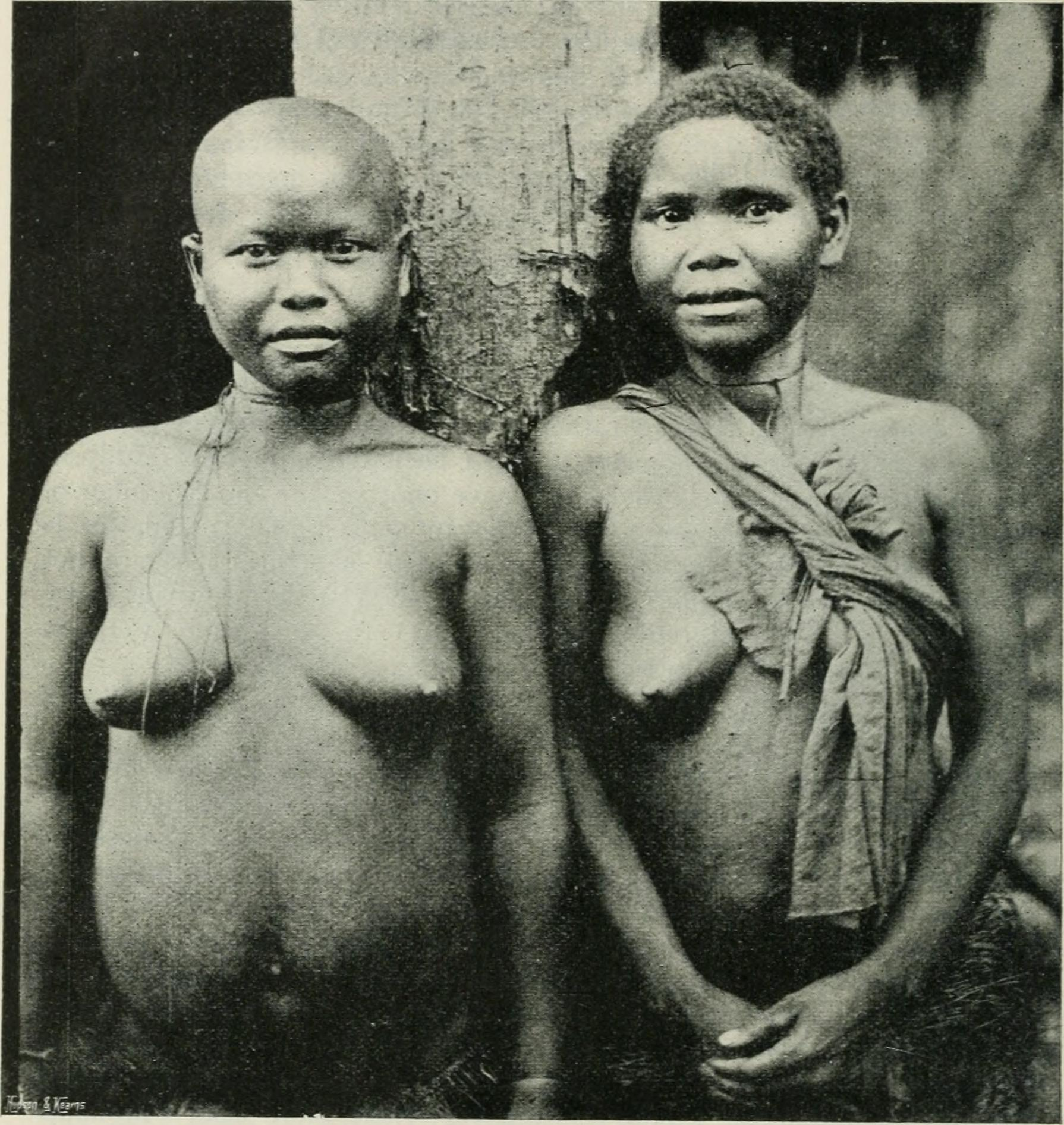
Freshly head shaven Semang women from Gerik, Hulu Perak District, Perak, 1885.

Until recently, most of the Semang led a nomadic way of life. They lived in temporary camps consisting of a group of primitive shelter structures. Typically, these are simple palm straw shields that are tilted, such that one edge stands on the ground, and the other is based on two or three supporting sticks. This design is a temporary accommodation that provides people with protection from wind and rain. Western groups of Semang sometimes put their lean-to in two rows facing to each other. Thus, a long common communal hut was formed in the form of a tunnel with exits at each of its ends.

Sometimes Semang erect circular dwellings with the center space being used as a meeting place for dancing and ceremonial rituals. For short stays they would take shelter in caves, rocky overhangs or groups of trees overnight.

Settled Semang live in small bamboo or straw huts on stilts. Residential groups built by the state under the RPS (Rancangan Pengumpulan Semula, meaning "Regrouping Schemes" in English) have typical Malay-style of wooden huts. RPS villages are provided with basic infrastructure such as roads, electricity, water supply, medical institutions, and elementary schools.

Traditionally, the Semang tribes place their homes very close to each other. A remnant of their nomadic way of life is that they typically leave garbage around their huts. Previously, Semang simply left their waste behind and moved on, so they had no need to remove it from around their homes. Now, their more settled lifestyle leads to some groups living in close contact with their own waste, increasing the spread of disease and polluting nearby water supplies.

Traditionally, Semang had a minimum of household items and tools, because all their treasure would need to be carried with them. Their homes, utensils and tools were made mainly for single use.

The traditional clothing of the Semang is a loincloth for men and skirts for women. These garments are made of bark from the terap, a species of wild bread-fruit tree, hammered out with a wooden mallet. Often the resultant cloth is decorated with segments of bamboo in patterns intended to magically protect its wearer from disease. These two garments are typically the only clothing worn; some go naked, although this is not customary. Women also tattoo and paint their faces.

== Society ==
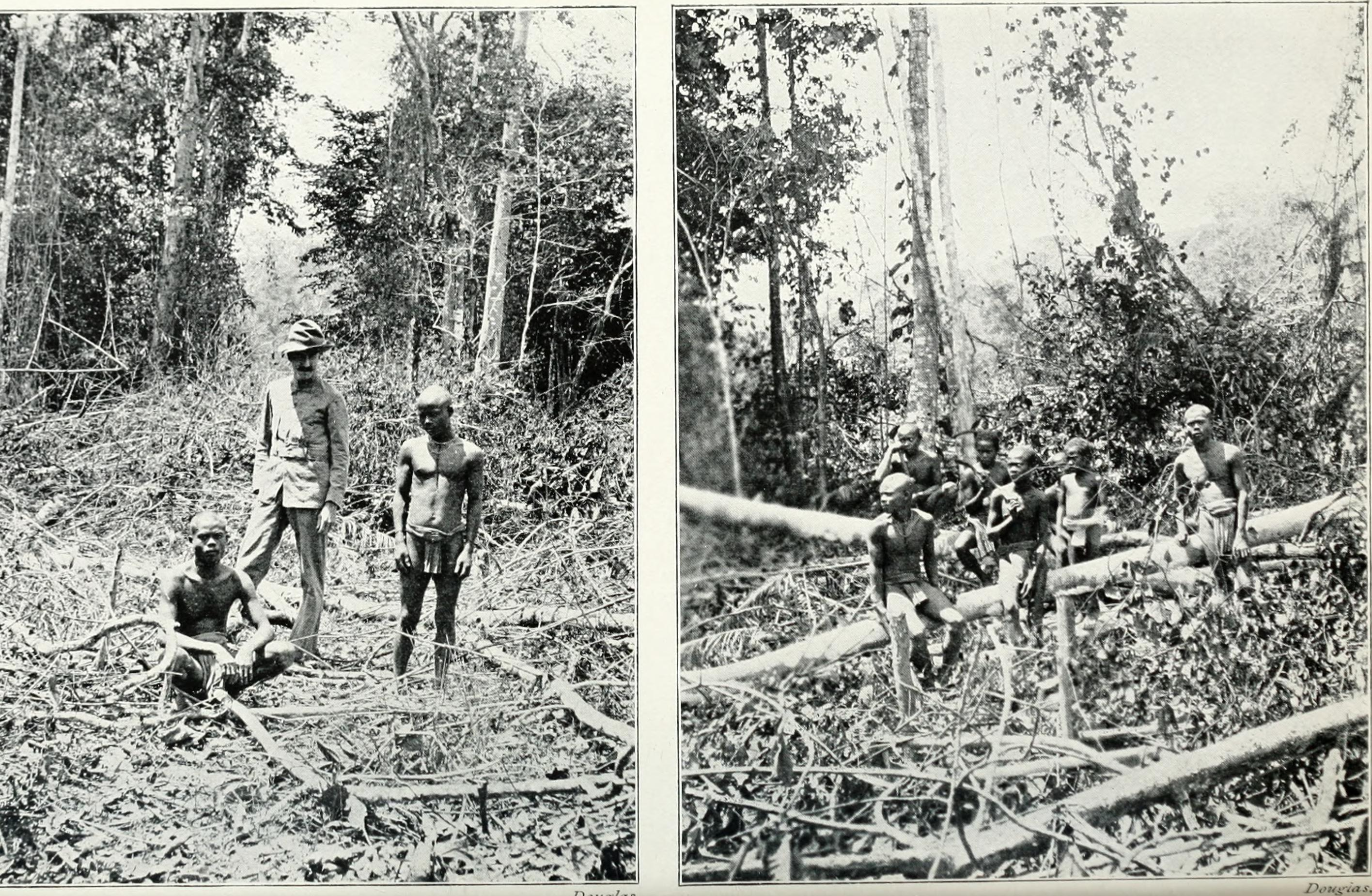
Semang from Gerik or Janing, Perak, 1906.

Semang lived in small family groups of 15-50 people without a strict tribal organization, as the jungle cannot support a large mass of people. Semang do not have associations with fixed membership, there are no related groups and no affiliation by ideology. Many camps consist of one or more extended families, but these are only temporary formations.

The only stable association in the Semang community is the nuclear family, consisting of a husband, a wife and their children. The family usually occupies an individual home, and adult children can put up their own housing located next to the hut or shelter of their parents. The family engages in farming together, and at the same time adults teach children the basic skills of management and cultural values of the group.

The kinship account is carried out on both the paternal and the maternal line. For the Semang, there is no difference between relatives, cousins, and siblings, but they do differentiate based on age categories by dividing their siblings into elder and younger groups.

Young people usually choose their own spouses, and parents have little influence on these processes. Theoretically, a future husband must ask for permission of marriage from a woman's parents, but this does not always happen. The marriage ceremony is as simple as possible and limited to the participation of the actual married couple, who often arranges a small holiday for themselves. Some groups do expect the groom to bring some gifts to his intended's parents. Marriage is considered concluded when the spouses begin to live together.

The general groups are exogamous. For the Semang, marriages between blood relatives and close family (persons related through marriage) are not allowed. These rules require the search for marriages among distant groups, thus creating a large-scale network of social ties.

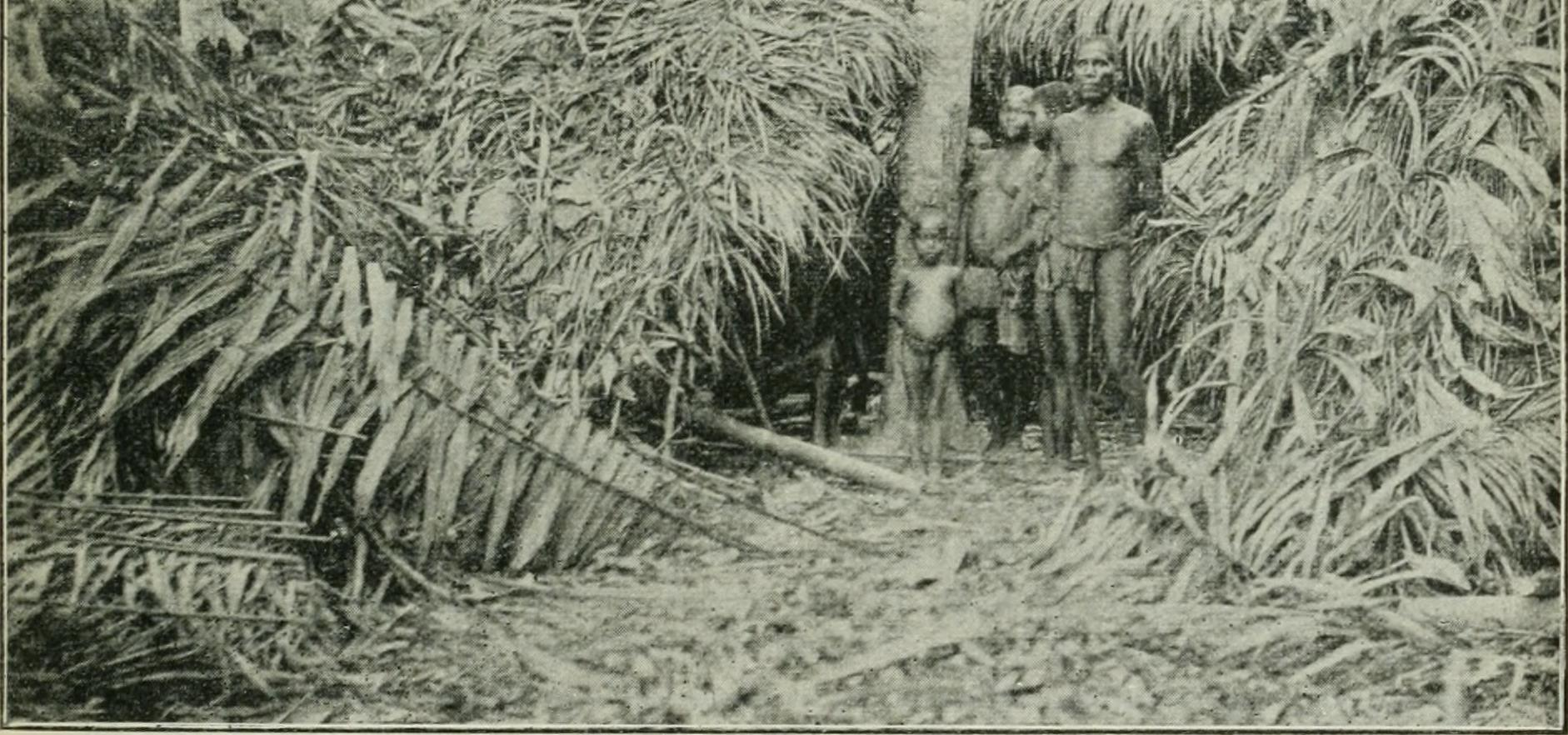
A Semang family in Perak, 1885.

The rules for avoiding physical contact with the opposite sex, backed up by appropriate taboos, make it impossible for sexual relations outside the family. Polygyny and polyandry are allowed, but they are rare. Instead, divorce is commonplace in most Semang groups, especially if the couple have no children. The procedure is very simple, the couple just ceases to live together. Sometimes there are conflicts on this ground, but in the majority of cases everything is peaceful, and the former spouses remain friendly, staying in the same camp.

Little children of divorced couples usually stay with their mother; older children make their own choices and often move alternately from one parent to another. The step-parent usually refer to the children from the previous marriage as their own. Just as in the case of a divorce or death of a wife, a Semang man may marry again and again but remain monogamous.

The nuclear family is also the main economic unit of the Semang society. Women play an important role in the traditional economy, spending a lot of time harvesting fruits from the jungle and fish from the rivers to provide the family with food. Pregnant women or women with young babies are not expected to fully perform their work. Children in the Semang community do not have "economic value". Most of the time during the day they simply play, simulating the activity of adults of the respective gender.

Characteristically, with the transition to a sedentary lifestyle, the birth rate among the Semang is rapidly increasing. In addition, the food stamps that children receive at school and bring them home have become a significant factor in family life and have changed the perception of children in society.

Semang society is egalitarian. People are interconnected by ties of kinship and friendship. Social classes do not exist. No adult has any authority over any other adults. There are no means of coercion. Individual autonomy is highly respected, and antisocial behavior is discouraged. People believe that violations of the norms and violence will be punished by supernatural forces. Disputes are resolved through public discussion with the goal of achieving a consensus decision. Individuals who do not get along with one another cannot be in the camp at the same time. In the event of a conflict that involves third parties, the Semang, as a rule, would simply move on to avoid violence.

Individuals of charismatic personality, men and women, may have some influence on others, hence become informal leaders in certain situations, but they have no real power. Such a leader is called penghulu, a Malay term. Some penghulu, exclusively for men, are senior members appointed by the Department of Orang Asli Development, but they only act as mediators between the group and outsiders and they do not have any power within the group.

A penghulu receive wages from the department. Formally, they are elected by a group of men, specifically for this purpose as organized by the authorities. No direct consultations with women are held, although they do express their views freely. Usually the position of the penghulu is inherited by the eldest son, although there are exceptions. If the current penghulu does not suit the JAKOA, the department pressures the group to make a replacement.

== See also ==
- Andamanese
- Maniq people
- Aboriginal Australians
- Papuan peoples
- Melanesians
- Orang Asli
- Orang Asli Museum

== Notes ==
- "Semang" . New International Encyclopedia. 1905.

=== Bibliography ===
- A. Hale: “On the Sakais” – Journal of the Royal Anthropological Institute vol. 15. London: Trübner & Co 1886, 285–301. (There is also a special print assigned to “Harrison and Sons” who was the printer for Trübner & Co.)
- Geoffrey Benjamin & Cynthia Chou (2002), Tribal Communities in the Malay World: Historical, Cultural and Social Perspectives, Institute of Southeast Asian Studies, ISBN 98-123-0167-4
- Alberto G. Gomes (September 1982), Ecological Adaptation And Population Change: Semang Foragers And Temuan Horticulturalists In West Malaysia (PDF), East-West Environment And Policy Institute
- Joachim Schliesinger (2015), Ethnic Groups of Thailand: Non-Tai-Speaking Peoples, Booksmango, ISBN 978-16-332-3229-7
- Alberto G. Gomes (2007), Modernity and Malaysia: Settling the Menraq Forest Nomads, Routledge, ISBN 978-11-341-0077-4
