= Lanoh =

Lanoh may refer to:

- Lanoh people, an ethnic group of Malaysia
- Lanoh language, a language of Malaysia
