= Lanoh people =

Ethnic group from Malaysia

Lanoh people Lano / Sabub'n / Menik Semnam / Orang Lanoh / Sakai Jeram
Total population
- 390 (2010)

Regions with significant populations
- Malaysia (Perak)

Languages
- Lanoh (Semnam, Sabüm), Malay

Religion
- Traditional religion

Related ethnic groups
- Semang (Batek people, Jahai people), Negritos (Maniq people, Philippine Negritos, Andamanese)

The Lanoh are a group classified as "Orang Asli" ("original people") of the Semang branch by the government of Malaysia. They live in the Malay Peninsula and number around 390. They are also known as Sabub'n or Lano. However, the Lanoh community in Gerik and Lenggong, Perak would identify to themselves as Menik Semnam (meaning "Semnam people" or "Orang Semnam" in Malay language), a name that refers to the Lanoh people that lived at the Semnam River. Whereas the Malay community in Upper Perak would refer the Lanoh people as Sakai Jeram.

== Demography ==
as of 2010, there 390 Lanoh people living in Malaysia. The majority of Lanoh live in the jungle as hunter-gatherer, but other Lanoh reside in urban areas where they are engaged in employment, largely on tapping rubber and oil palm estates. During the British Malaya, the Lanoh people were also regularly employed by British administrative officers as jungle rangers and porters, which suits to the lifestyle of the Lanoh people living in the jungle. Traditionally, the Lanoh people boil ketum roots and drink it to treat diabetes, and boiling Ataulfo (mango) roots to reduce high-blood pressure.

The population dynamics of the Lanoh people are as the following:-

Year	1960	1965	1969	1974	1980	1993	1996	2000	2003	2004	2010
Population	142	142	264	302	224	359	359	173	350	350	390

== Culture ==
The Lanoh were once nomadic; a lifestyle that carried into open marriage practices where one man would marry a woman and have children, and then move on to another place and marry another woman and have children and continues to do so as they move from place to place. Lanoh women are also known to practice polyandry, a practice that is not much known to other Semang groups. But many of them now live in permanent villages in the Hulu Perak district of Perak State, near the Kelantan borders.

Following European contact, the Lanoh were hunter-gatherers using caves, many within the state of Perak, as shelters during hunting trips. Approximately 100 years ago, they made charcoal drawings on the walls of caves.

The Lanoh believe that all living things, both plants and animals have their own spirit to a point where certain of these animals are considered poisonous and inedible, fearing of its negative effect. They believe people should be linked symbiotically with the other animals and plants. The belief in the spirits of living beings to make them afraid of the spirits of dead people (especially their ancestors) and of the spirits of the game animals.

In fact, there is a custom that is an unwritten law in the village that all animals that are caught in the jungle should not suffer any pain. The Lanoh and Temiar people utilize animals for dietary, medicine and for folktales.

== See also ==
- Mani people
