= Batek people =

Group of Malaysian indigenous people

Batek people Orang Batek / Bateq
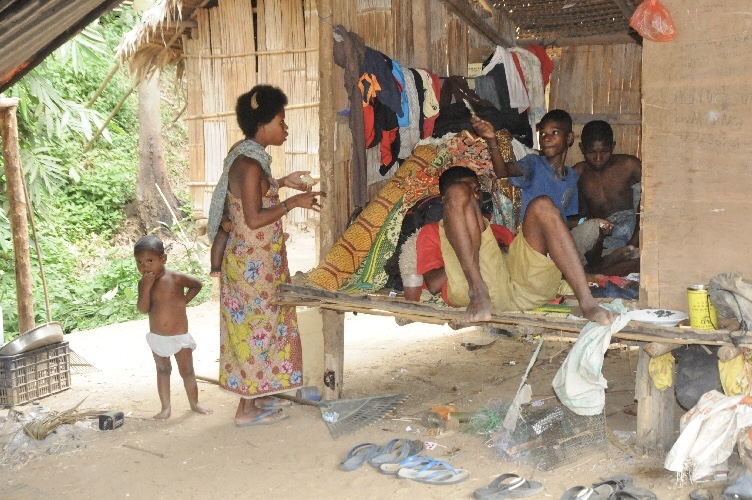
- A Batek family

Total population
- 1,359 (2010)

Regions with significant populations
- Malaysia (Pahang, Kelantan, Terengganu)

Languages
- Batek language, Malay language

Religion
- Traditional religion and significant adherents of Islam, Christianity and Buddhism.

Related ethnic groups
- Semang (Jahai people, Lanoh people), Negritos (Maniq people, Philippine Negritos, Andamanese)

The Batek (or Bateq) people are an indigenous Orang Asli people (numbering about 1,519 in 2000) belonging to the Semang group, who live in the rainforest of peninsular Malaysia. As a result of encroachment, they now primarily inhabit the Taman Negara National Park. The Batek are nomadic hunters and gatherers, so the exact location of their settlements change within the general confines of the area that they inhabit.

The common phrase used to refer to them, 'orang asli', signifies a diverse group of which the Batek tribe is a part. It means 'original people' in Malay and was probably first used to identify these people by the British. The Batek, however, refer to themselves as 'Batek Teh', which means "forest people". The Malay Srivijaya empire came in contact with the Negrito. Historically they traded with the local populations while other times they were subjected to exploitation, raids, slavery in Malaya, paying tributes to the Malays. For more than a thousand years, some Negrito tribes from the southern forests were enslaved and exploited until modern times while others remain in isolation and avoided contact.

The Batek people were first documented by Europeans in 1878, when explorer-naturalist Nicholai Miklukho-Maklai of Russia wrote about them.

Until about 1970 much of inland peninsular Malaysia was difficult to reach for the purposes of logging, so the Batek were widespread throughout that region. Since it is now possible to harvest the trees in that region, the Batek are largely confined to Taman Negara National Park and the surrounding region.

== Population ==
The Batek population more than doubled from 530 in 1960 to 1519 in the year 2000. The official census of the Batek population is as follows:

Year	1960	1965	1969	1974	1980	1993	1996	2000	2003	2004	2010
Population	530	339	501	585	720	960	960	1,519	1,255	1,283	1,359

These figures include several Batek sub-groups. Ethnographic researchers have recognised several Orang Asli sub-groups that are commonly called 'Batek', including the Batek De' (dɛˀ), Batek 'Iga' (ˀigaˀ), Batek Teh (təh), Batek Tanum (tanɨm) (also known as Mayah), and the Batek Nong (nɔŋ).

== Language ==
The Batek language belongs to the Eastern Jahaic sub-branch of Aslian languages which is part of a wider Mon–Khmer language family. Batek's closest linguistic relatives Jahai and distantly related to other Aslian languages. Despite being a small language, it has quite a number of dialects namely Teq, Iga, Deq and Nong, with the latter two probably considered distinct enough to be separate languages. Batek is mostly an oral language with few written records, but it is usually written in a modified Latin alphabet.

== Way of life ==
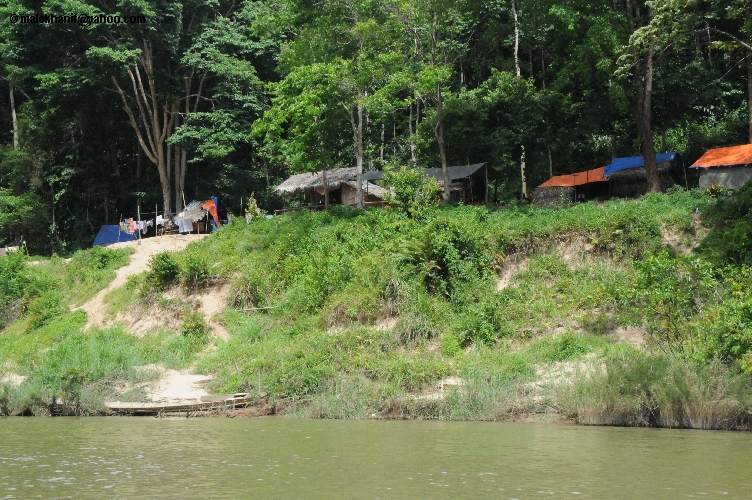
Batek houses in Taman Negara, Malaysia

The Batek normally live in familial groups, in tents and lean-tos, with about 10 families forming an encampment. Each encampment generally has control of the land immediately around it, but since the Batek do not believe in the concept of private land ownership, the encampment considers it to be the caretaker of the land, rather than its owner. Also since they are nomadic once most of the usable wild plant resources have been depleted from a given location they will move to another spot, within their habitat.

The Batek economy is very complex, with some things such as land, having no right of ownership. Somethings where there is a personal property right, but social norms dictate that it be shared with the entire society such as food that is found by foraging. There are some things that are considered personal property, such as a man's blowgun, or a women's hair combs.

Batek are a peaceful society. If a member of the group has a conflict with another member of the group they will discuss the matter privately. If that does not end the disagreement, each will publicly share their side of the argument in an attempt to have other members of the camp suggest a resolution. Since each adult member of the camp is equal, there is no internal leader or adjudication system so one or both of the aggrieved parties will leave the camp until cooler heads prevail.

== Sharing ==
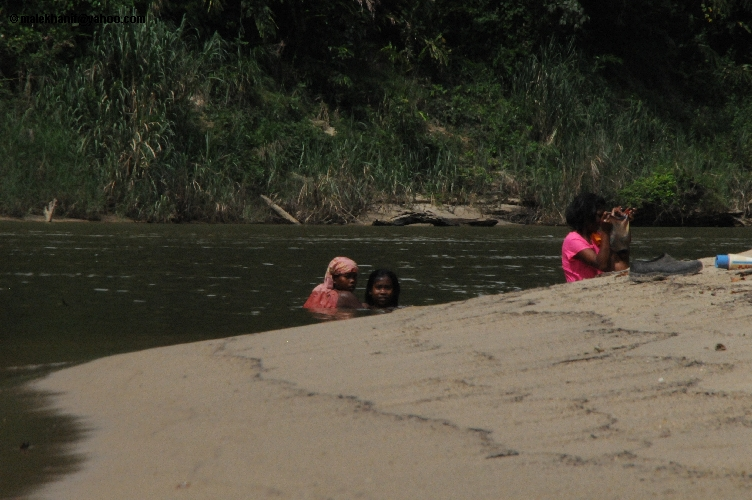
Batek people bathing in the Tembeling River, Pahang, Malaysia

It is a moral obligation for Batek to share food they have acquired. Normally the person who harvests the food item will first give to their immediate family, then their extended family and finally the rest of the camp. If everyone is giving to everyone else, a family who is down on their luck will still have food to eat, although not as much as if they harvested it themselves.

Since the hunting and butchering of meat causes a large amount of food to enter the camp at once, there is a more formal and ritualistic way of dividing it, for example with a monkey, first the members of the hunting party eat the offal and tail, because they cook the fastest, then the cooked meat is divided into about 13 parts, so that each family in the camp gets some, with the portions adjusted according to the size of the family.

The Batek do not consider this sharing of resources to be an act of kindness, they believe that all food items belong to the forest, so that the person who happens to be in possession of food has a moral obligation to share it. Since the dwellings are open, it is impossible to hoard food without others knowing about it. Since selfishness is prohibited, it would not be considered stealing for another member of the camp to take food away from someone who was hoarding, if the taker was hungry.

They feel an obligation to give when they are asked for something. This feeling is reinforced by their belief that to refuse a request can cause super-natural harm to the person who was refused and by their knowledge that this will evoke the anger of the community at the offender.

Although personal possessions like radios and tobacco belong exclusively to the person who acquired them, it is common for those items to be lent or sometimes even borrowed without the owner's knowledge. The Batek believe that if a requested favor is refused, the person who was turned down, will likely suffer misfortune, and when the misfortune happens everyone in the camp will be angry at the person who was unkind.

There are two more practical reasons that sharing and kindness are widespread in the Batek community, first each man has a blowgun, used mainly for hunting, so if all in the group did not get along, someone could be subject to violence. Also the rain forest is very hot and damp so keeping things long-term is impractical, food will rot and hardware will rust if it is not used frequently.

== Modern challenges ==
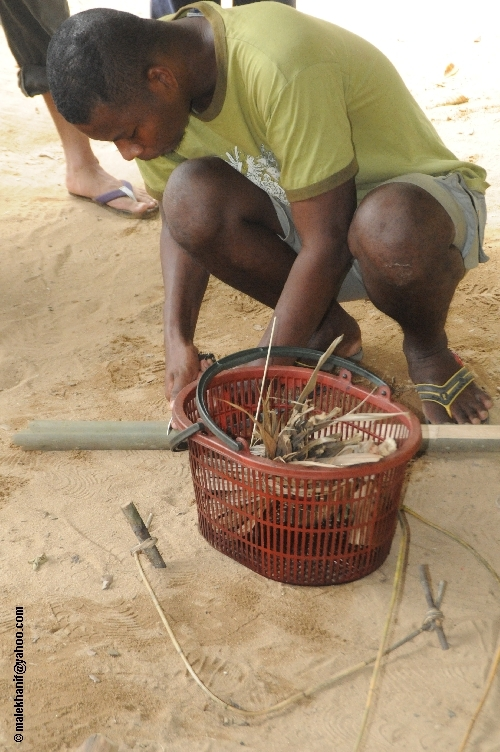
A Batek man attempting to start a fire

External disagreements become a little more tricky. Since they do not have leaders or a military, the Batek are generally at the mercy of the Malaysian Government. Malaysia does not recognise Batek sovereignty, so during the 20th century the Government gradually encroached on the Batek land to use it for logging and farming. Since the 1960s the Government has encouraged the Batek to live in Pos Lebir and become non-nomadic farmers. Most Batek are unwilling to settle in Pos Lebir because it has not been dedicated to the Batek; they would have to leave there if the Government asked and they would lose their nomadic lifestyle and their religion. One of the Batek summed up the situation by saying: “We Batek are rich if we have a cooking pot, digging stick, bush-knife, lighter, tobacco, salt and fishing pole. Also a man is sad if he doesn't have a blowpipe. We only want four or five sarongs, we don't need trousers. If we live here (in Pos Lebir), we need money, if we have money we buy a lot. But if we have no money, no problem, we reject possessions. When we live in the forest, we don't need them. We can dig tubers. If someone doesn't have food, others give it as in the old days.”

=== 2019 measles outbreak ===
In 2019, the Batek people in Kuala Koh Village of Kelantan was affected by a mysterious disease which took the lives of more than 15 people from the community. The disease was firstly thought as a mysterious illness for nearly a month before being finally confirmed as measles by the Malaysian Health Ministry following growing national attention on the outbreak. The cause of the spread in the community is due to low coverage of MMR immunisation which is attributed to the relatively low immunisation rate among the community with their nomadic lifestyle with findings by Malaysian Health Ministry found that although 61.5% of the villagers received their first measles, mumps, and rubella (MMR) shots, only 30% of them had their follow-up shots.

== Settlement areas ==
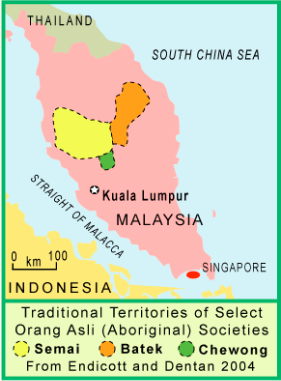
The orange area indicates location of the Batek people in Peninsula Malaysia

Some of the settlements that the Batek people are located includes:-

- Kampung Orang Asli Dedari, Kuala Tahan, Taman Negara, Pahang
- Kampung Kuala Sat, Kuala Tahan, Taman Negara, Pahang
- Kuala Kemiang, Kuala Tahan, Taman Negara, Pahang
- Sungai Cheka, Kuala Lipis, Pahang
- Semetong, Pahang
- Merapoh, Kampung Jalang, Merapoh, Pahang
- Kampung Orang Asli Kuala Koh, Kelantan
- Kampung Pasir Linggi, Pos Lebir, Gua Musang, Kelantan
- Kampung Aring 5, Gua Musang, Kelantan
- Pasir Lenggi, Ulu Kelantan, Kelantan
- Kampung Sungai Berua, Kenyir Lake, Hulu Terengganu District, Terengganu
- Kampung Sungai Sayap, Besut District, Terengganu

== See also ==
- Mani people
