= Negrito =

Set of ethnic groups in Southeast Asia and Andaman islands

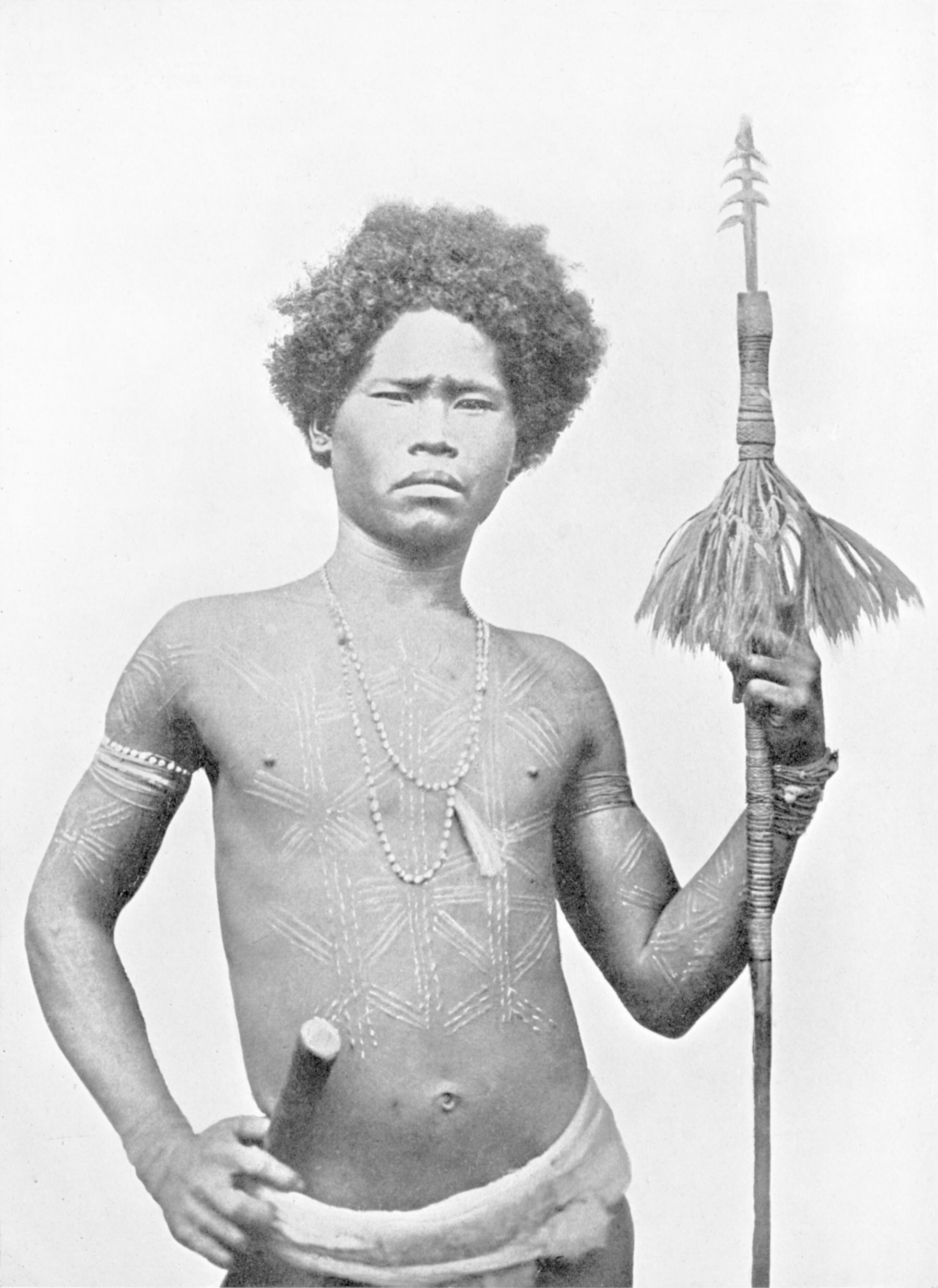
- A Luzon Negrito with spear

Regions with significant populations
- Isolated geographic regions in India and Maritime Southeast Asia

Languages
- Andamanese languages, Aslian languages, Philippine Negrito languages, English

Religion
- Animism, folk religion, Anito, Christianity, Islam, Buddhism, Hinduism

The term Negrito (/nɪˈɡriːtoʊ/; lit. 'little black person') refers to several diverse ethnic groups who inhabit isolated parts of Southeast Asia and the Andaman Islands. Populations often described as Negrito include: the Andamanese peoples (including the Great Andamanese, the Onge, the Jarawa, and the Sentinelese) of the Andaman Islands, the Semang peoples (among them, the Batek people) of Peninsular Malaysia, the Maniq people of Southern Thailand, as well as about 30 different Negrito peoples of the Philippines (including the Aeta of Luzon, the Ati and Tumandok of the Visayas, and the Mamanwa of Mindanao).

== Etymology ==
The word Negrito, the Spanish diminutive of negro, is used to mean "little black person." This usage was coined by 16th-century Spanish missionaries operating in the Philippines, and was borrowed by other European travellers and colonialists across Austronesia to label various peoples perceived as sharing relatively small physical stature and dark skin. Contemporary usage of an alternative Spanish epithet, Negrillos, also tended to bundle these peoples with the pygmy peoples of Central Africa on the basis of perceived similarities in stature and complexion. Historically, the label Negrito has also been used to refer to African pygmies.

Modern scholars have questioned the usefulness of bundling peoples of different ethnicities by similarities in stature and complexion. This analysis notes peoples classified as Negritos have a wide range of ethnic backgrounds, speak different languages, and have varied religious beliefs and cultural practices, all of which makes it difficult to speak of them as a unified group. Additionally, the original concept of Negrito has influences and associations now seen as ethically questionable, and not meeting modern scholarly standards.

== Population ==
India has approximately 550 total Andamanese Negrito people.

Malaysia has approximately 4,800 Semang Negrito people. This number increases if some of the Orang Asli peoples who have either assimilated Negrito population or have admixed origins are included, with 141,230 total Orang Asli people in 2006.

The Maniq Negrito population of Thailand has been variously estimated at 300, 382, and <500.

There are over 100,000 Negrito people in the Philippines, including 50,236 Aeta people in 2010, and 55,473 Ati people in 2020.

== Culture ==
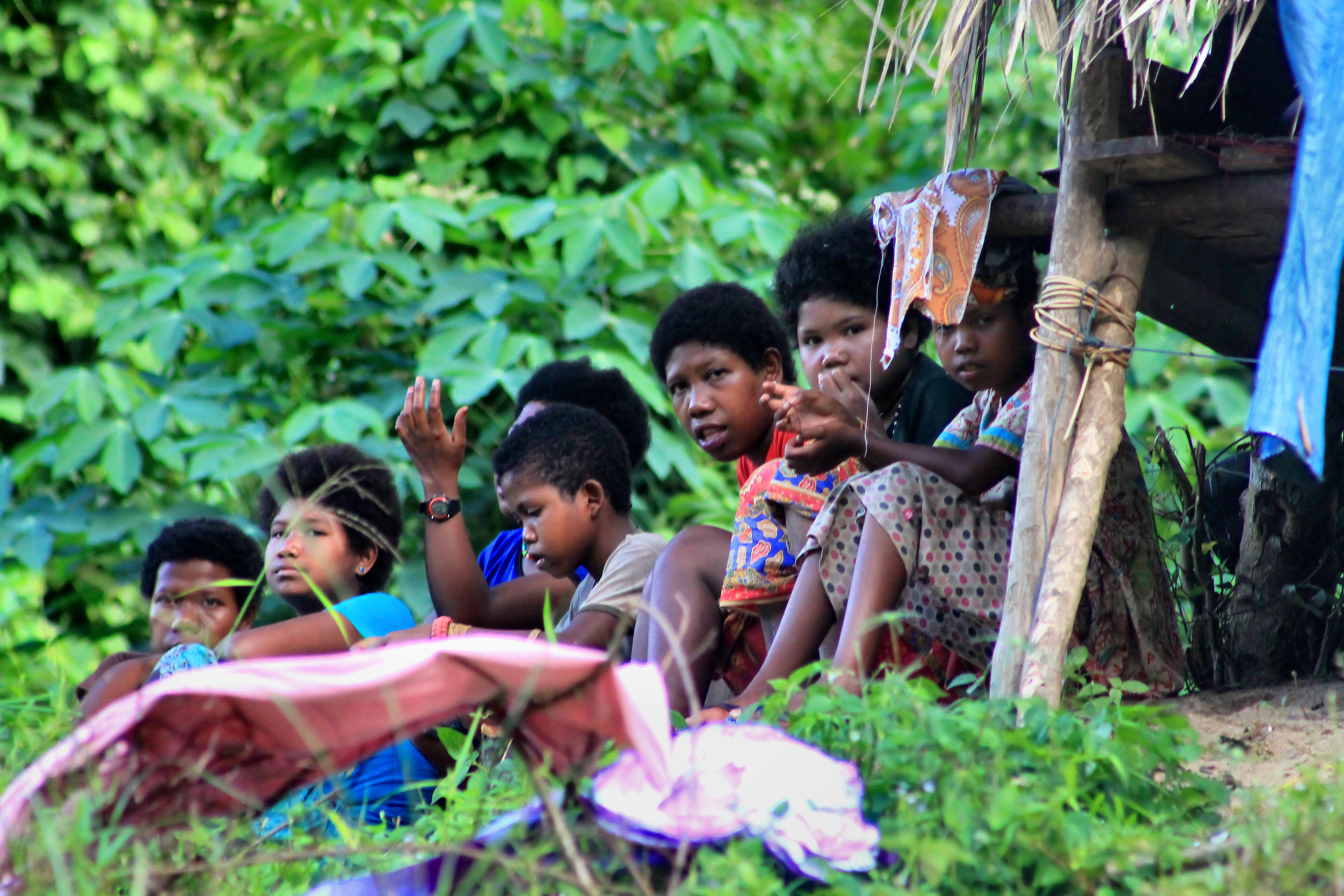
Batek family in Malaysia.

Most groups designated as "Negrito" historically lived as hunter-gatherers, although some also used agriculture. Today most live assimilated to the majority population of their respective homeland. Discrimination and poverty are often problems, caused either by their lower social position, their hunter-gatherer lifestyles, or both.

== Origins ==
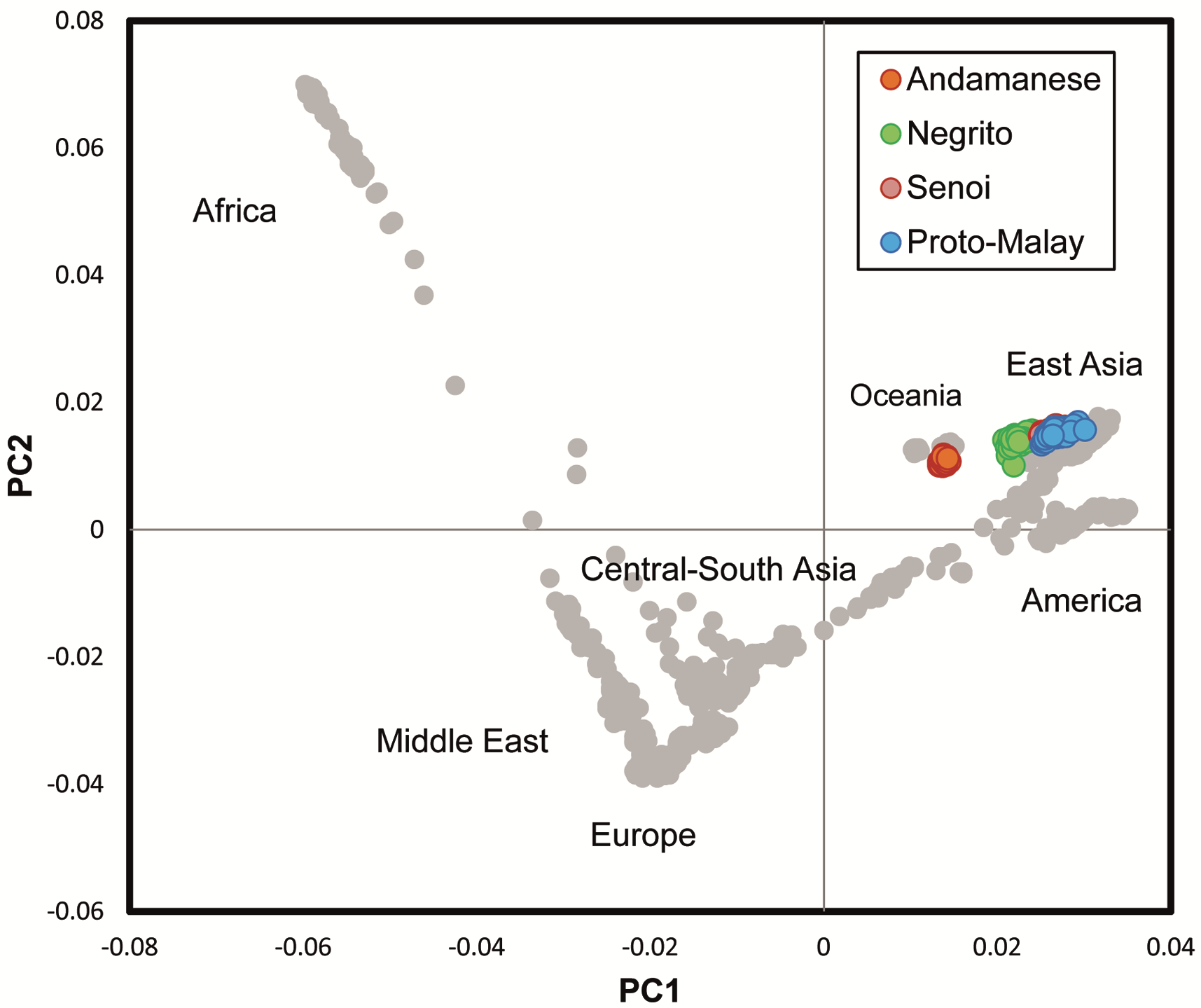
Position of various ethnic groups considered "Negrito". Negritos and Oceanians are most closely related to East Asians followed by Native Americans.

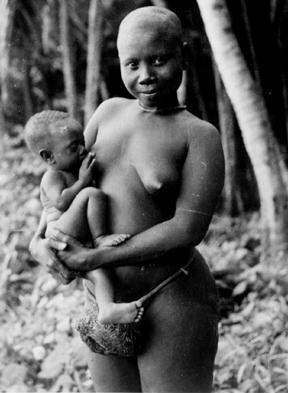
A young Onge mother with her baby (Andaman Islands, India, 1905)

Based on perceived physical similarities, Negritos were once considered a single population of closely related people. However, genetic studies suggest that they are genetically heterogeneous and consist of several separate groups, descended from the same ancient East Eurasian meta-population that gave rise to modern East Asian peoples and Oceanian peoples. The Negritos form the indigenous population of Southeast Asia, but were largely absorbed by Austroasiatic- and Austronesian-speaking groups who migrated from southern East Asia into Mainland and Insular Southeast Asia with the Neolithic expansion. The remainders form minority groups in geographically isolated regions.

Genetic studies provided mixed evidence of modern Negrito populations, with populations considered Negrito showing diverse admixtures. Although a genetic affinity between Andaman Islanders, Malaysian and Filipino Negritos was detected by some authors, several studies indicate that Negrito populations are closer to their neighboring non-Negrito communities in their paternal heritage and autosomal DNA on average. Most modern groups considered Negrito possess significant admixture from Austronesian or Austroasiatic sources, with Negrito groups in the Philippines found to have between 30 and 50% Austronesian ancestry.

The Semang and Maniq in the interior of the Malay Peninsula share genetic affinities with ancient Hoabinhian hunter-gatherers, while also possessing ~35% East Asian related ancestry, likely brought about by recent admixture with surrounding agriculturalist communities in the region, according to the authors of a 2022 genetic study.

It has been found that the physical and morphological phenotypes of Negritos, such as short stature, a broad and snub nose, curly or kinky hair and dark skin, "are shaped by novel mechanisms for adaptation to tropical rainforests" through convergent evolution and positive selection, rather than a remnant of a shared common ancestor, as suggested previously by some researchers.

According to a 2026 genetic study, Negrito populations are genetically differentiated from the Andamanese but share some ancestral components, reflective of their shared East Eurasian origins. They are also more related to Papuans and exhibit admixture with the ancestors of Papuans.

A Negrito-like population was most likely also present in Taiwan before the Neolithic expansion and must have persisted into historical times, as suggested by evidence from morphological features of human skeletal remains dating from around 6,000 years ago resembling Negritos (especially Aetas in northern Luzon), and further corroborated by Chinese reports from the Qing period rule of Taiwan (1684 to 1895) and from tales of Taiwanese indigenous peoples about people with "dark skin, short-and-small body stature, frizzy hair, and occupation in forested mountains or remote caves".

== See also ==
- Australo-Melanesian – Outdated grouping of human beings
- Mbabaram people – Aboriginal Australian people
- Melanesians – Indigenous inhabitants of Melanesia
- Philippine Negrito languages – Languages of the Negrito peoples of the Philippines
- Pygmy peoples
