= Batek language =

Austroasiatic language spoken in Malaysia

Batek
- Native to: Malaysia
- Ethnicity: 1,160 Batek people (2008)
- Native speakers: 1,000 (2006)
- Language family: Austroasiatic: Aslian; Jahaic; Eastern; Batek
- Dialects: Teq; Deq (De’); Iga; Nong

Language codes
- ISO 639-3: btq
- Glottolog: bate1262
- ELP: Batek

Batek is an Aslian language of Malaysia, spoken by the Batek people. The Mintil (Batek Tanum), Dèq and Nong dialects may be separate languages. The number of speakers is small and decreasing.
