= Maniq people =

Ethnic group of Thailand

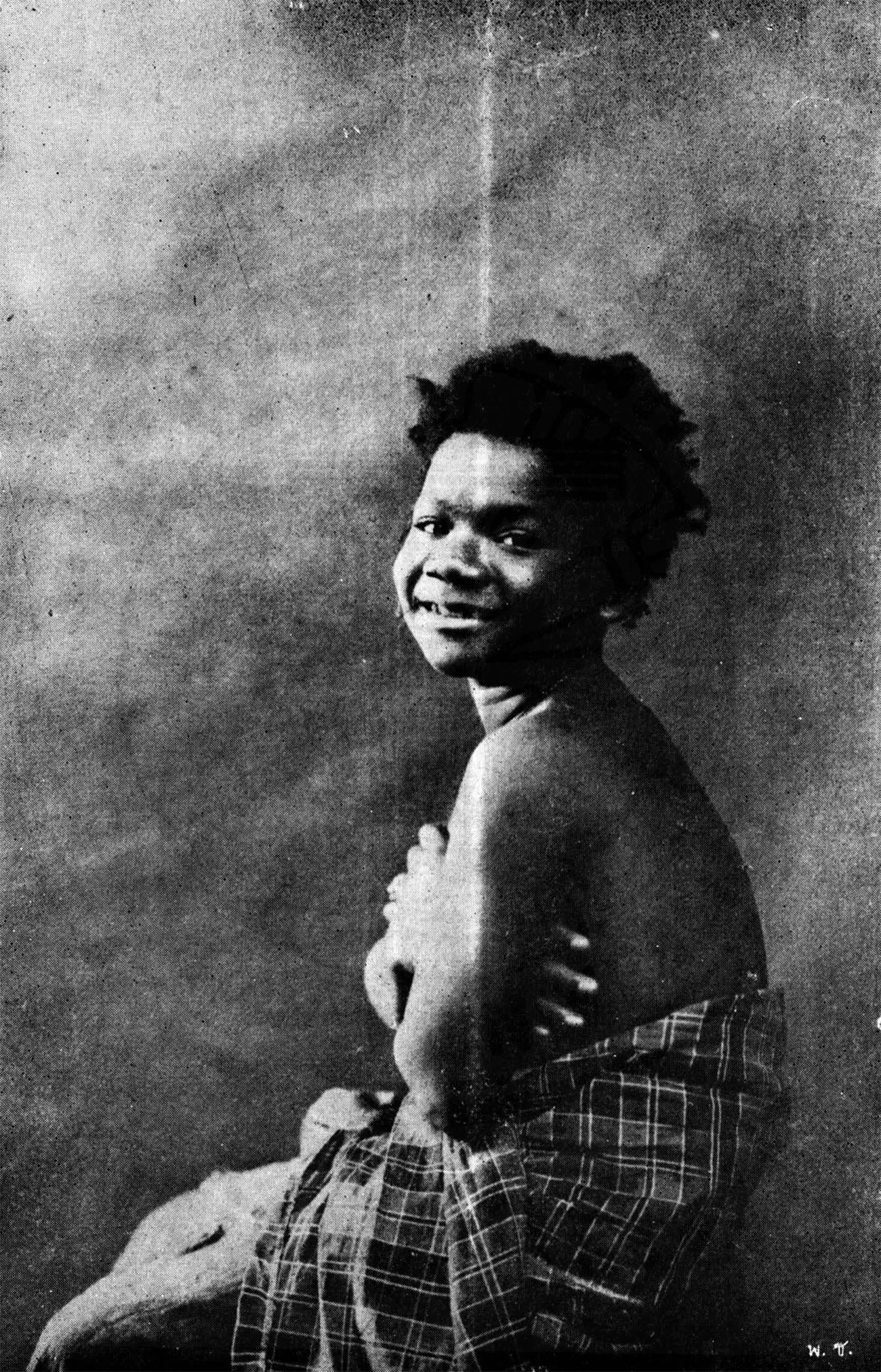
- Khanang, an ethnic Maniq person who was a royal page boy at the service of King Chulalongkorn of Siam. (1906)

Total population
- 350

Regions with significant populations
- Southern Thailand

Languages
- Kensiu, Ten'edn, Thai (L2)

Religion
- Animism

Related ethnic groups
- Semangs

The Maniq or Mani are a Negrito ethnic group of Thailand. They are more widely known in Thailand as the Sakai (Thai: ซาไก), a controversial derogatory term meaning 'barbarism'. They are the only Negritos in Thailand and speak a variety of related Aslian languages, primarily Kensiu and Ten'edn, which do not have standard writing systems.

In Thailand, the Maniq minority live in the southern provinces of Yala, Narathiwat, Phatthalung, Trang, and Satun.

== History ==
The Maniq people are among the earliest known inhabitants of Southeast Asia. They are part of the broader group historically referred to as "Negritos," which includes the Semang of Malaysia, the Aeta of the Philippines, and the Andamanese of India. These groups are believed to be descendants of the first modern humans (Homo sapiens) who migrated out of Africa approximately 50,000 to 60,000 years ago, following a southern coastal route into Asia.

Over time, these populations adapted to diverse forested environments across the region, maintaining distinct cultural and genetic lineages. While later waves of migration, such as the Austroasiatic and Austronesian-speaking peoples, brought agriculture and new technologies, groups like the Maniq remained relatively isolated, preserving foraging lifestyles and oral traditions.

Among the Malaysian sultans and rulers of the southern provinces of Thailand who ruled and enslaved the Negrito slaves, it was once regarded as prestigious to keep Negritos in their yards as part of collections of amusing jungle beings. In the first decade of the twentieth century, the king of Thailand, King Chulalongkorn (Rama V) visited the southern regions of his country and met with the Semang people. In 1906, an orphan Semang boy who was captured and named Khanung was sent to the royal court, where he was perceived as the adoptive son of the ruler. From this event, it has led to the patronage of the Semang people by the royal court.

The Banthat mountain chain became a base area for the communist insurgency in Thailand during the 1970s and thus a battleground between communist guerrillas and Thai government forces. Especially during the years of 1975-1977, the insurgents were battered in ground and air attacks. The Mani suffered terribly during this war, with government forces frequently mistaking the smoke of Mani campfires for insurgent activity. Those living in Trang and Phatthalung provinces had to move to the sanctuary of Thoungwan district in Satun province.

During field campaigns in 1995 and 1996, the occupation of ten rock shelters and nine forest camps was recorded. All these belong to the present-day system of up to one hundred different living sites, inhabited by Mani groups during one year in the forested region of Trang, Satun and Phatthalung Provinces.

Today, the Maniq continue to face challenges related to land rights, cultural preservation, and environmental change.

== Social and Cultural Life ==
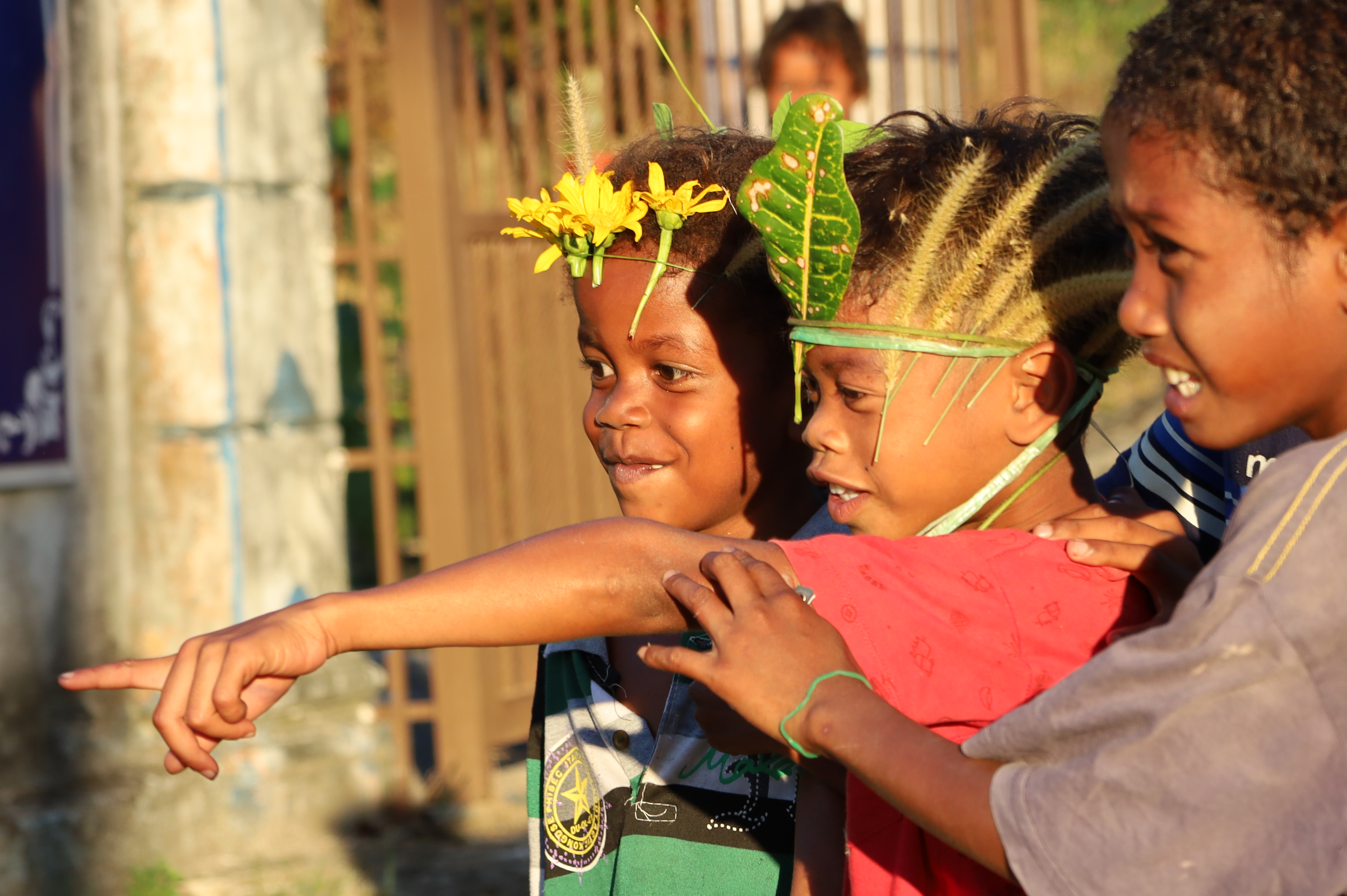
Kensiu Maniq children playing while wearing a daun lalang style tempok in Kedah, Malaysia.

The Maniq are a hunting and gathering society. They build temporary huts of bamboo with roofs made of banana leaves. They hunt many types of animals and consume many different kinds of vegetables and fruits. They wear simple clothes made of materials such as bamboo leaves. They are familiar with many different species of medicinal herbs.

The director-general of the Rights and Liberties Protection Department of the Justice Ministry said the Maniq are categorised into two groups based on where they live. The first group lives in the Titiwangsa Mountains in Yala and Narathiwat, while the second group dwells in the Banthat Mountains in Phatthalung, Trang, and Satun.

Current estimates on population size range from 300 to 350 people, up from 100 to 300 people according to pre-1960 estimates.

Occasionally, Mani clans will move to a new area. Hunters are sent to navigate the terrain in order to find a spot for their clan to set up camp. When a spot is found the hunters return to their clan to bring them to their new home.

== Genetics ==
Among the Maniq, balancing selection has been identified in genes relating to olfactory receptors and the immune system (particularly within the HLA region). In the latter case, this selection occurred due to the benefit of genetic diversity in a pathogen-rich environment (such as the rainforests the Maniq inhabit), so as to protect against a wide range of threats.

== See also ==
- Negrito
- Semang
- Batek people
- Lanoh people
- List of ethnic groups in Thailand
