= Mintil language =

Austroasiatic language spoken in Malaysia

Mintil
- Mayah, Tanɨm
- Native to: Malaysia
- Region: Lipis District, Pahang
- Native speakers: 400 (2020)
- Language family: Austroasiatic: Aslian; Jahaic; Eastern; Mintil

Language codes
- ISO 639-3: mzt
- Glottolog: mint1239
- ELP: Mintil

Mintil (alternatively Batek Tanum, Tanɨm, or Mayah) is an Aslian language of Malaysia. It is considered to be a variety of the Batek language.

== Background ==
In the late 1960s, Geoffrey Benjamin had come across speakers of Mintil among patients of the Orang Asli hospital at Ulu Gombak, just outside Kuala Lumpur.

== Names and villages ==
The people are commonly referred to as Batek. There are 400 speakers of Mintil in Lipis District, Pahang who call themselves Batɛik ‘in-group people’, Batɛik Tɔm Tanɨm ‘people of the Tanum River’, and Batɛik Mayah [ba'tɛik may'ãh]. Their villages are:

- Kampung Sungai Garam (Tɔm Mayɛm) (4° 27’ 12” N, 102° 3’ 20” E; 2.5 km south of Kampung Dada Kering)
- Kampung Bencah Kelubi (Batuˀ Jalaŋ) (4° 38’ 23” N, 101° 58’ 45” E; 4 km east of Kampung Telok Gunong)
- Kampung Paya Keladi (Tɔm Hɨyaŋ) (4° 24’ 18” N, 101° 55’ 27” E; 10 km north of Kampung Chegar Perah)
- Kampung Tɔm Kəlkɔəˀ (4° 34’ 39” N, 101° 59’ 43” E; 2 km north of Kampung Kubang Rusa)

== Phonology ==
The following phonemes of Mintil was recorded by Benjamin (1985).

Mintil onsets
		Labial	Alveolar	Palatal	Velar	Glottal
Plosive	plain	p	t	c	k	ʔ
Plosive	voiced	b	d	ɟ	ɡ	
Fricative		ɸ	s			h
Nasal		m	n	ɲ	ŋ	
Approximant		w	l r	j		

Vowels
	Front	Central	Back
High	i	ɨ	u
Mid	e	ə	o
Low	ɛ	a	ɔ

== See also ==
- Batek language
