= Orang =

Orang may refer to:

== Places ==
- Orang County, in North Hamgyong Province, North Korea
- Orang National Park, in Assam, India
- Orang, Nepal, a village development committee

== Ethnic groups ==
- Orang Asal, a classification of native people in Malaysia
- Orang Asli, a various indigenous ethnic groups in the Malay Peninsula
- Orang Kanaq, an ethnic group in Indonesia
- Orang Kuala, an ethnic group in Indonesia and Malaysia
- Orang Laut, an ethnic group in Indonesia, Malaysia, and Singapore
- Orang Rimba, an ethnic groups in Indonesia
- Orang Seletar, an ethnic groups in Malaysia and Singapore
- Orang Sungai, an ethnic groups in Malaysia
- Orang Ulu, an ethnic groups in Malaysia

== Other uses ==
- .O.rang, a British band
- Orang station, a railway station in North Korea

== See also ==
- Orangutan, three species of great apes
