= Moklen =

Moken may refer to:

- One of the Moken peoples
- Moklen language
