= Jakun people =

Group of indigenous people of Malaysia

Jakun people Urang Jakun / Orang Ulu
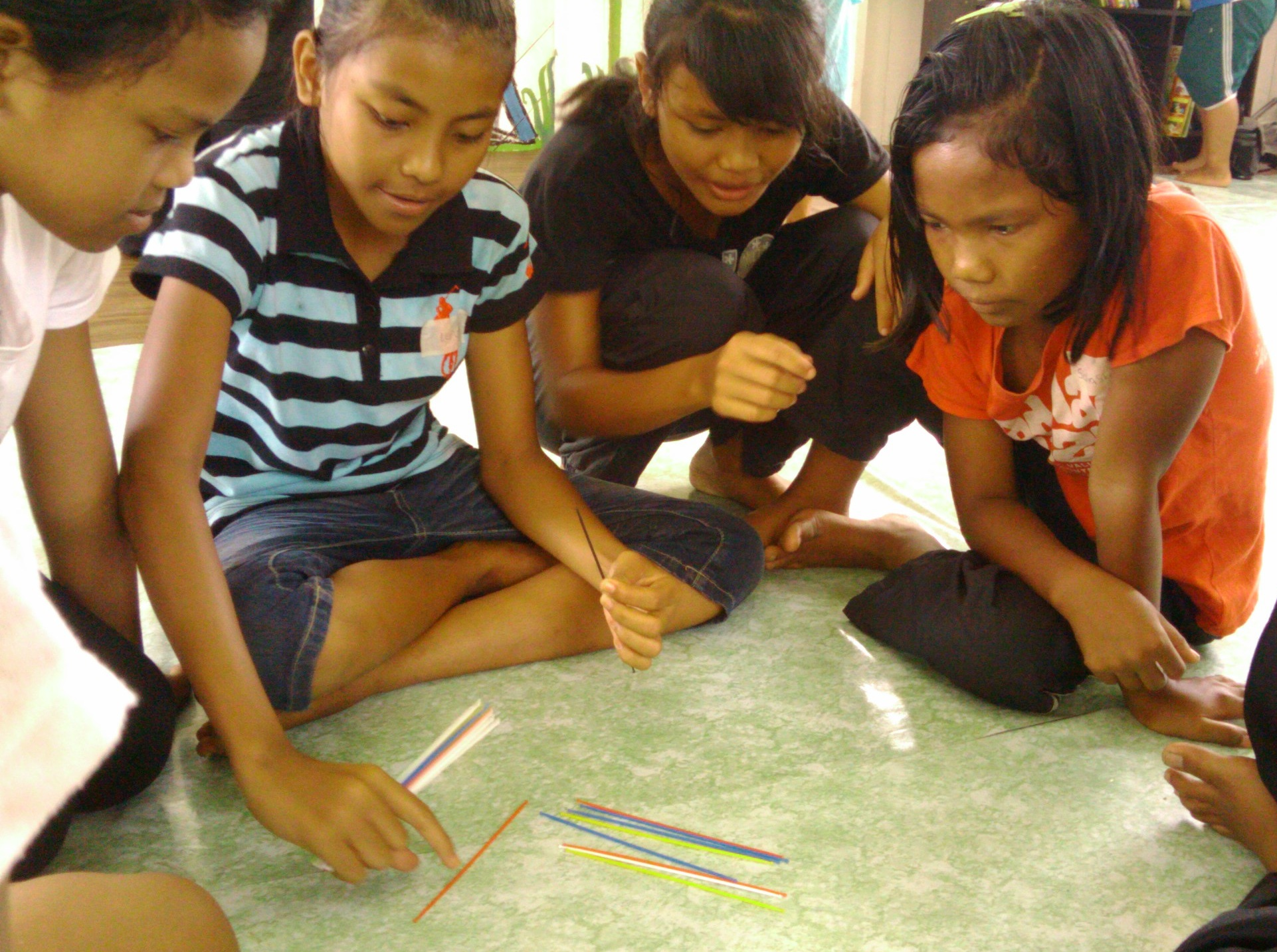
- Jakun teenagers playing pick-up sticks in a community centre.

Total population
- 31,577 (2010)

Regions with significant populations
- Malaysia (Johor and Pahang)

Languages
- Jakun language, Malay language

Religion
- Traditional religion, Chinese folk religion, Christianity, Islam

Related ethnic groups
- Temoq people, Malay people

Jakun people or Orang Ulu/Orang Hulu (meaning "people of the upstream") are an ethnic group recognised as Orang Asli (indigenous people) of the Malay Peninsula in Malaysia.

The Malaysian government recognises 18 different sub-groups of Orang Asli, including three broad divisions: the Negrito (Semang), Senoi and aboriginal Malays (Proto-Malay). The Jakun people are the largest sub-group in the Proto-Malay division, and the second-largest Orang Asli sub-group overall, after the Semai.

In the past, the name Jakun was used as a term that encompasses all sub-groups in the Proto-Malay division, including the Temuan people of the southwest and centre of the Peninsula and several coastal communities of the south of the Peninsula, including the Orang laut (Orang Seletar, Orang Kuala) and Orang Kanaq.

In terms of anthropological characteristics, the Proto-Malay are southern Mongoloid, generally taller and having lighter skin than other groups of Orang Asli.

In standard Malay, the name "jakun" carries a derogatory connotation meaning "slave" or unsophisticated person.

== Settlement areas ==
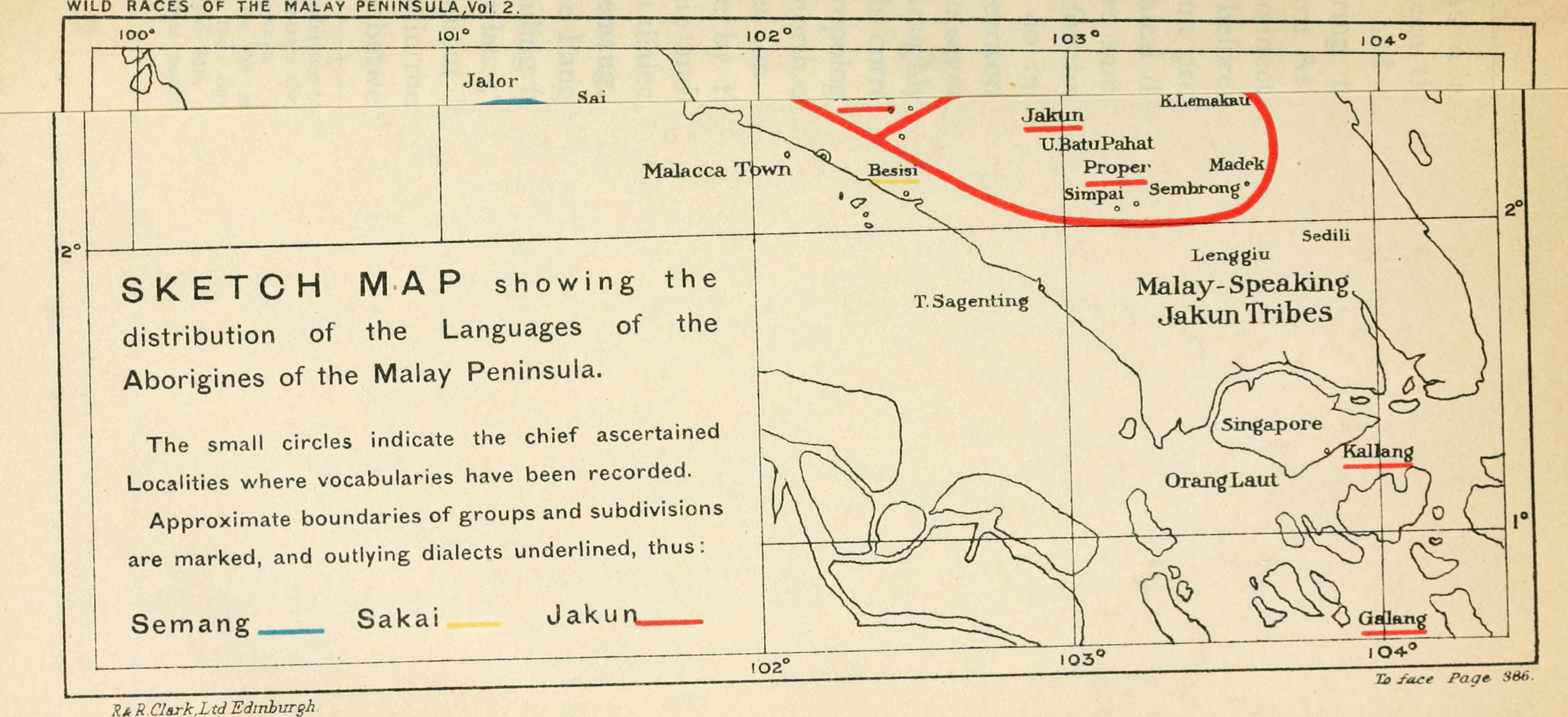
The area circled in red indicates the location of the Jakun people in southern Peninsula Malaysia.

Jakuns are mostly located in the southern region of the Malay Peninsula, in the interior of the southwest Pahang and north Johor All Jakun settlements are located near the jungle, and their population is more or less dependent on jungle resources. The geography of this region varies from a wet swampy area to dense tropical jungles. The local climate is determined by high humidity and seasonal monsoons.

Jakun live in villages belonging to different categories. This development is the Rancangan Pengumpulan Semula (RPS, "Regrouping Plan") settlement, a regrouping scheme for undeveloped settlements and those that are developing. In RPS settlements, all residents have individual house, built by the government where they are provided with electricity and water supply, communication facilities, public halls, shops, schools, children's and medical institutions, asphalted roads are laid for them. People from different settlements located in or near the jungle were moved to such villages. Much of the people still continue to live in old settlements. Usually there is no electricity there, water is taken from natural sources, and there are only a few houses built out of durable building materials. Access to these villages are through earthen roads and jungle paths.

Some of the settlements that the Jakun people are located includes:-

- Kampung Sayong Pinang, Kota Tinggi District, Johor
- Kampung Semangar, Kota Tinggi District, Johor
- Kampung Pasir Intan, Kota Tinggi District, Johor
- Kampung Peta, Endau-Rompin National Park, Johor
- Kampung Batu 10, Gunung Arong, Mersing, Johor
- Bekok, Segamat District, Johor
- Kampung Cendahan, Chini Lake, Pekan District, Pahang
- Kampung Buluh Nipis, Muadzam Shah, Kuantan, Pahang
- Kampung Langkap, Rompin, Pahang
- Kampung Batu Tiga, Rompin, Pahang

== Population ==
The Jakun people are the second largest ethnic group among the Orang Asli and the largest among the Proto-Malay people group. They are numbered at 31,577 people as of 2010.

The population dynamics of the Jakun people are as the following:

Year	1960	1965	1969	1974	1980	1991	1993	1996	2000	2003	2004	2010
Population	6,786	7,331	8,995	8,719	9,605	17,066	16,637	16,637	21,484	27,448	27,448	31,577

Distribution of the Jakun population by states (1996, JHEOA statistic):

State	Jakun people	Total Orang Asli	Percentage of Jakun people
Pahang	13,113	33,741	38.9%
Johor	3,353	7,379	45.4%
Selangor	157	10,472	1.5%
Negeri Sembilan	14	6,188	0.2%
Total	16,637	92,529	18.0 %

== Appearance ==
The Jakuns are taller than the other aboriginal peoples of the Malay Peninsula, the Semang and Sakai tribes. Jakun people typically have olive-brown to dark copper skin color. Some have intermarried with ethnic Malays or Chinese. Those who marry or assimilated with Malays usually adhere or convert to Islam, and end up abandoning their culture and traditions. While families with Chinese heritage may practice Chinese folk religion in addition to Jakun customs.

== Language ==
Jakuns speak Jakun language, a Malayic language of the Malayo-Polynesian languages group, closely related to Malay. Perhaps it should be considered as one of the archaic dialects of the Malay language. It does not have its own written language, is gradually replaced by Malay and is under threat of disappearance.

The Malaysian radio on the Asyik FM channel broadcasts separate Jakun programs daily.

== History ==
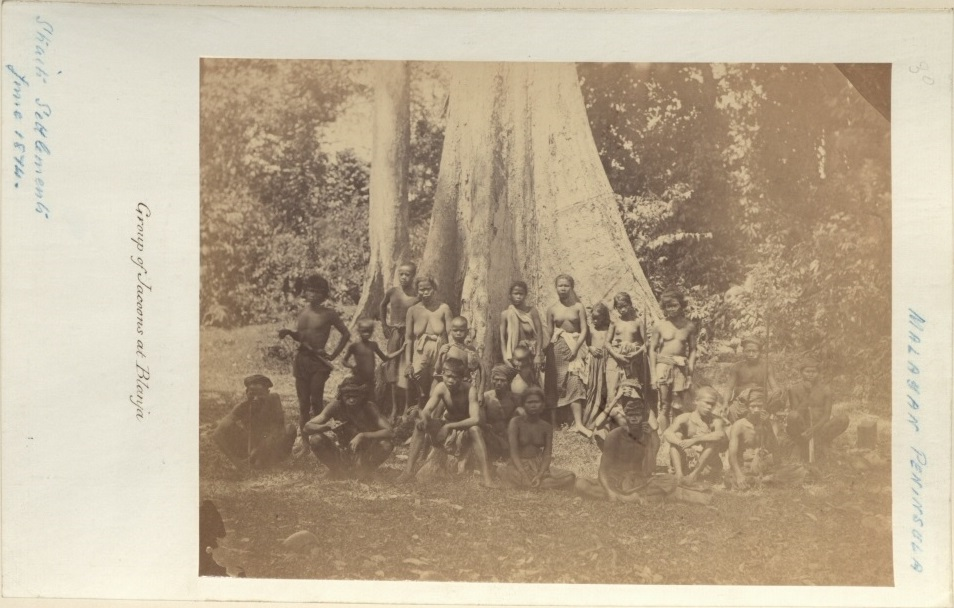
A group of Jakun people at Blanja, Perak Tengah District, Perak, June 1874.

It is traditionally believed that the ancestors of Jakun people, like other Proto-Malay people, arrived in the Malay Peninsula from the southern Chinese province of Yunnan some 5,000 years ago. The ancestors of the other two groups of Orang Asli were living here are the Semang and Senoi people.

The first Malay people arrived on the peninsula much later, probably around 1,500-2,000 years ago from Taiwan. Initially, the Malay people initially established trade relations with the local population, but later began to dominate the land. The Malay people often mixed with the Jakun people, and the aborigines became part of the Malay population. Those indigenous people who opposed the outsiders were eventually moved to the interior regions and retained a significant part of their traditional culture.

For a period of long time the Jakun people continued to live mostly in isolation from the outside world.

Jakun people living along the Endau River in Johor recall with horror how during the Second World War, pillars of Japanese soldiers were passing their jungle.

The active penetration of the state government and individuals into traditional Jakun areas began in the mid-1980s, and intensified in the 1990s. In 1987, there was a land conflict between local Jakun settlers and the other settlers in Pasir Asam, near Kota Tinggi, Johor. The state government was favouring the settlers and offered the Jakun settlers to move to a new settlement specially built for the indigenous people.

The state government regards the Orang Asli as poor and marginalized ethnic minorities that are far from center of developments. Their socioeconomic activity, which is closely linked to the surrounding natural resources, is considered to be backward. For a better life, they are offered to move to permanent residence in villages based on the model of Malay peasants. As a result of the implementation of government programs under the resettlement scheme, most Jakun people were forced to leave their traditional villages and found themselves in specially constructed for them new state-owned so-called RPS (Rancangan Pengumpulan Semula, the "Regrouping Plan") sites whose settlers are provided with basic amenities. Although they were placed in new state-funded houses in already existing villages, the provision of amenities and infrastructure is noticeably lagging behind. Jungles that are cut down near Jakun villages were replaced with other commodity crop plantations that are not theirs, but the Jakun people still receive revenues from these plantations.

The resettlement of Jakun people to new settlements has often occurred in relation with some natural disasters. Such as the villagers of Selingkong and Meranti in Pekan District, Pahang moved here after a major flood in 1971. Another group of Jakun people living in the jungles of Endau, left their native land through a cholera outbreak settled in the Segamat District and Kota Tinggi District in the state of Johor, as well as in Rompin District in the state of Pahang.

Now their villages are far from the forest, they are deprived of their native environment, where they collected rattan, root crops, looked after their forest plants. This is also added with a significant depletion of the remaining natural resources.

There are areas of Jakun settlements that found themselves in the areas of attention in the tourism industry. Tourists are attracted primarily by "untouched nature" of the locals. A popular place for ecotourism, particularly Lake Chini, with its legend about the immersion of an ancient city of Khmer Empire under water. However, due to the depletion of the local natural resources, the flow of tourists has decreased. In 2007, they managed to attract only 17,000 people.

== Traditional economy ==
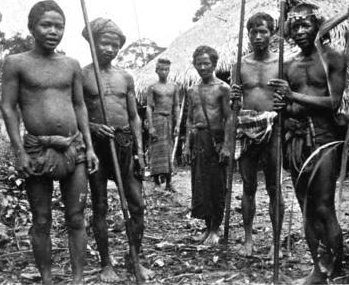
Jakun blowgun hunting party, 1906.

In the past, the Jakun people were hunter-gatherers. The nutritional diet are based on fish and wild animals. Animals such as wild boars, indigenous deer species (pelandok, kancil and kijang), lizards, monkeys and other small animals are hunted. Blowguns (sampit) are employed in hunting; which is usually made of bamboo tubing with sharpened tip bamboo darts that are pre-dipped in poison. Jakun hunters can shoot their blowgun with deadly precision of 30 meters.

Cage traps (bubu) made of bamboo and bounded by rocks are used to catch fish in rivers or streams. The type and shape of the cage trap depends on the size and type of fish they are going to catch.

Jungle produce such as wild fruits, rattan, wood, rubber, wax, camphor and herbs are gathered. A significant portion of these produce are then exchanged for other commodities.

In some areas, the Jakun people also engage in primitive agriculture. They had small farms in the jungle. For this purpose, the land was cleared by slash-and-burn method. Rice and tuber-based crops like sweet potatoes are grown. They practice shifting cultivation where after two seasons of land cultivation had passed, they would move on to another plot of land and start everything again from the beginning. They would only return to the old plot of land after many years.

However, most Jakun people prefer not to engage in farming but to exchange foods from the Malay and Chinese people with their jungle produce such as kemenyan, gaharu, dammar gum and rattan by barter. Thus they also received clothing, tobacco, salt, gambier and areca nut palm.

In using natural resources, the Jakun people must take into account the ownership of specific communities in a certain territory. Although they do not physically demarcate it, everyone knew well the limits of the possessions of their neighboring communities. People hunted animals, caught fish, cultivated farms, or collected grass only within their own territory. In addition, they do not take anything superfluous in regards to using natural resources, because they understood that the jungle should not be harmed.

The traditional house of the Jakun people is hut made of bamboo flooring, tree bark or wooden plank walls and Nipah roofing.

In the past, Jakun people wore loincloth around the hips made from the bark of trees with their own hands and did not buy clothes.

== Beliefs ==
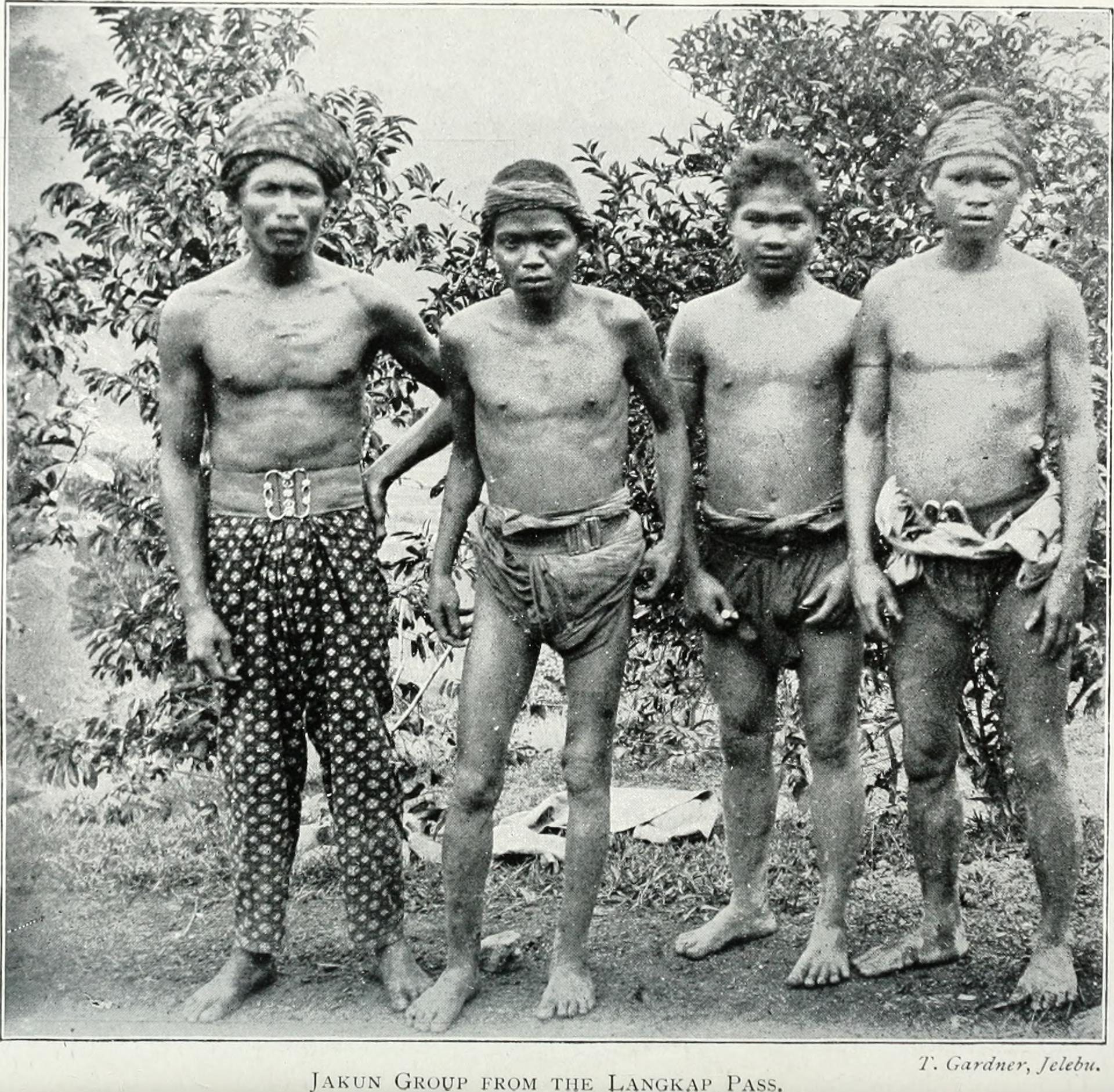
A group of Jakun men from the Langkap Pass, Negeri Sembilan, 1906.

Most Jakun people adhere to their animistic beliefs that are closely related to their natural surroundings. They believe that not only people have souls but animals, plants, and even inanimate objects (mountains, hills, settlements, rivers, rocks, caves, and so on) as well.

The personality of Orang Asli is closely linked to the nature and the land on which they live. It is the basis of their material and spiritual being, as well as the source of their physical and emotional nourishment. Jakun people do not consider themselves as a higher being higher than animals. They speak with animals too, as if they can understand them. There is great respect for every living thing, from the big elephant to the tiny cicada.

Jakun people are very superstitious, as they believe that misfortune awaits due to violations of rules established by nature for people.

Jakun people believe that the forces that "live" in natural objects are so powerful that they can bring about inconceivable things at first glance. In their beliefs, one could only just touch a leaf of a certain plant, and it can heal a sick person or make one crave a certain desire, because that leaf has the power of the spirit. For that reason, the Jakun people believe in the strength found in traditional medicine based on herbs and roots that they find in the wild.

It is believed that souls can leave their hosts, and they can be tempted or coerced by magic. A Jakun bomo (bomoh in Malay language meaning, "healer" or "sorcerers") are able to "communicate" with spirits, and because of this they are respected and revered by society. Sometimes they are more influential than rural heads. In order to communicate with supernatural forces or ancestral spirits, the bomo would hold special ceremonies.

In carrying out the policy of Islamization of the indigenous population; which became intensified after 1980, Muslim missionaries began to operate in Orang Asli communities. As a result, a certain part of the Jakun population was converted to Islam. According to JHEOA statistics in 1996, a total of 16,637 Jakun people totaled 1,324 Muslims (8%). In the state of Johor, the results of Islamization were more prominent with 20% of the Jakun people are Muslims, while in Pahang there are only 5%.

The Islamization of the Jakun people is often superficial. They regard themselves as Muslims only to receive certain benefits. There is also a psychological factor involved. Jakun people who live in close contact with the Malay people, would almost always say that they are Muslims. But they usually do not know any Muslim prayer, nor do they go to a mosque, and do not adhere to the laws of Islam.

== Changes under the influence of the present ==
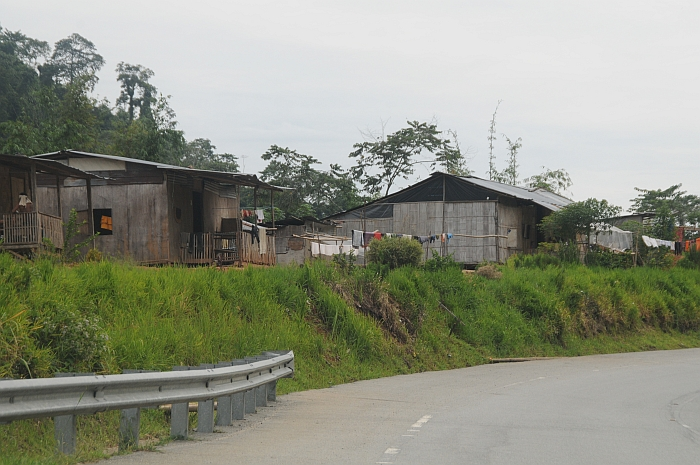
A typical village house for the Orang Asli.

Under the influence of integration into modern economy, the life of the indigenous peoples of Malaysia experience a transformation. Before the colonial era, many Jakun people would enter the jungle on a seasonal basis to harvest jungle produce. The Jakun people are now torn off from the jungle, although from time to time they would still harvest jungle produce. Traditional activities are no longer a source of income for them. Most Jakun communities in the modern age have a settled lifestyle and live in permanent villages practicing agriculture. Much of the Jakun people are collective owner of the rubber and oil palm plantations; the main commodity produced in the region. From these plantations, they receive monthly earnings. These funds, as well as government monetary assistance, are fully used to cover their daily expenses. In addition, people have plots of land in the village where groats (yams, lemongrass, cassava, bananas) are grown and animals are raised.

At the same time, due to the increased demand for jungle produce, some Jakun people have resumed harvesting of rattan, bamboo, wood, wild bush, roots and medicinal plants. The collected products are for sale.

Jakun people still use traditional traps for fishing. Although they are familiar with fishing rods, they only perceive their use for leisure. Unless there is really a need to catch fish, they would still use fish traps.

Some of the Jakun people work in the tourism field, especially among those that lived in the national park territories. They conduct excursions or services for tourists. Some of the locals began to organize tourist attractions in their villages with elements of local traditions such as arranging traditional greetings, selling traditional handmade products, provide training classes on local ways of hunting for tourists, fishing and jungle trekking.

Most children would go to school. Their parents have a positive attitude towards schooling, because they believe that education will improve the chances of children to have a better life. But like many other Orang Asli groups, however, they suffer from inadequate access to public schools, which can be far away from the communities.

Many of the young people work in cities. If the work brings them good income, then they will not settle back in their native villages.

Jakun people are becoming more and more modernized and they are no longer seen as a stereotypical indigenous people as they are dressed as like any ordinary Malaysians, watch television, listen to radio, drive cars, ride motorcycles and speak the Malay language. At the same time, the security of Jakun people's everyday amenities is still insufficient. Many of the Jakun villages do not have water supply and electricity. The poverty rate in many of their communities is one of the highest in the country. Young people also do not have enough business opportunities.

== Society ==
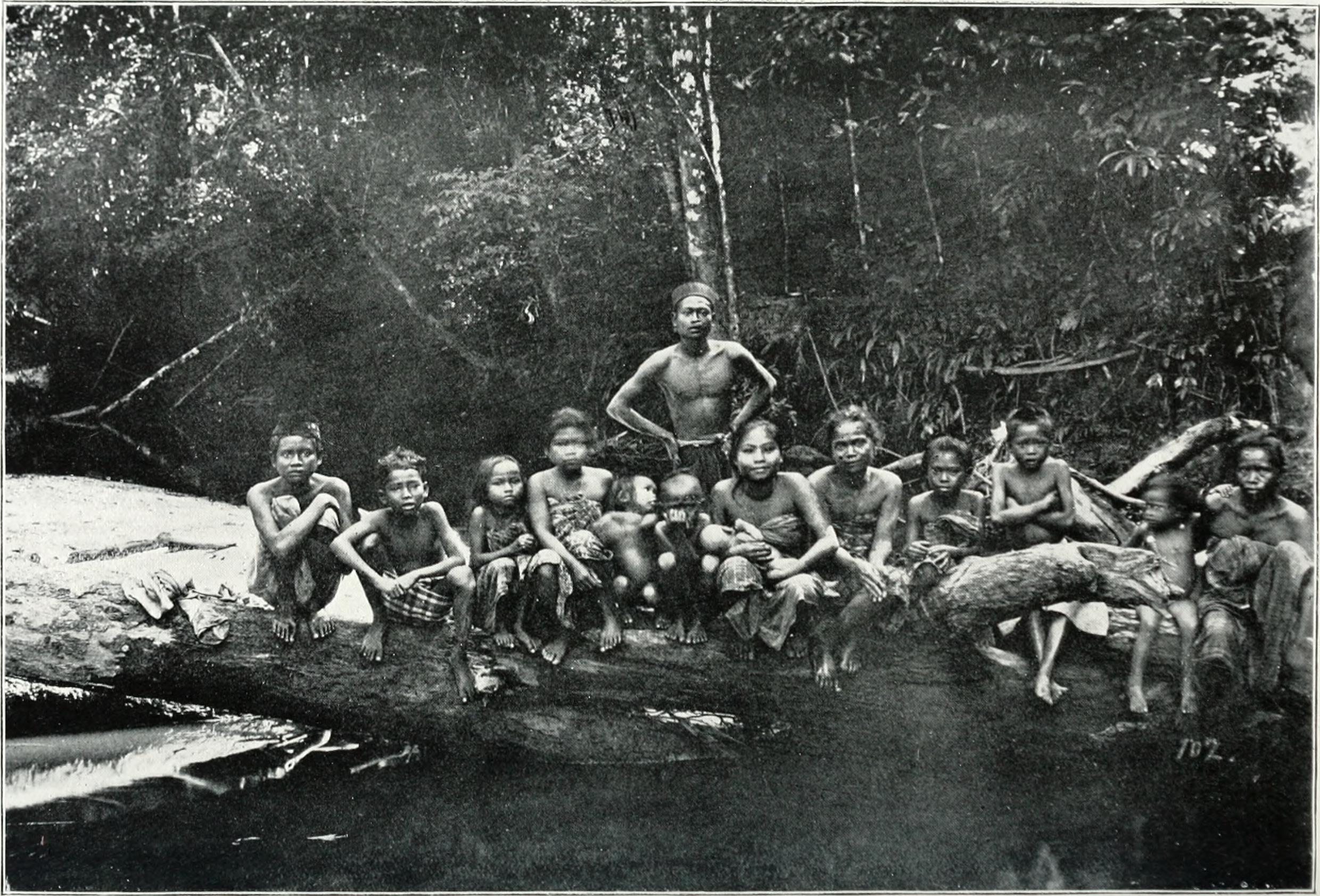
A group of Jakun people in Ulu Batu Pahat, Johor, 1906.

A Jakun village usually consists of several families. Those families are grouped into a village community headed by a village head, chieftain, leader or elder called, Batin. Unlike the Malay people, the Jakun community is an informal association of fully autonomous families. In the past, the village head often headed the group only during their wanderings in the jungles and hunting. At the same time, in areas closer to Malay settlements, such a leader gradually turned into a hereditary Batin leader.

The nucleus family; which usually consists of five or six individuals, predominates. The Jakun people live in close contact with their relatives, brothers and sisters, parents and children are usually standing next to each other. Here they attach special importance to the institution of the family, such as values of respect for the elders, as well as the character of each person. The family is very stable and intact. Before marriage, children live with their parents, until they would start their own new family. Although they live separately, they would often visit their parents.

Family life begins about 17 years old. When a boy chooses a girlfriend, his family sends a matchmaker to arrange a marriage and set the value of the dowry for the young. According to Jakun's customs, the bride's family later in the form of a gift returns to the bridegroom's family for about half of the dowry. A dance is performed during the wedding day, in the middle of which the bride would dash off into the jungle followed by the bridegroom to chase her. Should he failed to return without the bride, the wedding would be called off and he would be jeered by the attendees of the wedding. During the wedding ceremony, young couple must feed each other with rice.

Usually after a marriage, when the young couple do not have their own house, the husband goes to live with his wife's parents. According to tradition, every wife must visit their husband's parents for at least three days each year. This event is celebrated injunction with traditional holidays.

Jakun people are usually monogamous, and divorces occur extremely rarely among them. In cases of adultery, punishment may even be death. Traditionally, the man would have his wife; who have committed the offence tied to a tree in front of his house, and then hides in the bushes with three spears. Her lover; whom she had committed the offence with should try to free her and bring her into her husband's house. At this point, the husband throws the spear out in ambush and to take the life of either his wife or her lover. If the lover can manage to bring woman into the house, then she cannot be killed anymore, but she can still be driven out of her husband's house. A wife in the same way cannot punish her unfaithful husband in an event of adultery. If the man divorces his wife, then he will lose his dowry unless if the woman divorces her husband, then she must return the dowry to her husband.

Men and women in Jakun society are equal. The husband is the head of the household, therefore it is he who is responsible for ensuring the material needs of the family, which in most cases he works outside of the home. The woman on the other hand mainly deals with housework, including cooking, washing and taking care of children. In the field, there are representatives of both sexes. Besides housework, women are engaged in rubber tapping, collecting wild fruits, herbs and oil palm fruits. Despite the fact that men dominate the economic field, the role of women here is also gradually increasing. There are already female entrepreneurs. If in regards to the outside world, Jakun communities are predominantly men, whereas decision making at the family level is usually carried out by women. Women are not silent and reduced here, as it is with Malay Muslim women, they are actively involved in all conversations and discussions.

The birth of a child changes the identity of the child's parents and grandparents; of which they move up to a more respectable category. Their name changes accordingly, since this time the parents are called by the name of their eldest child with the addition of "father" or "mother". A new name is also given to newly born's grandmother and grandfather, now that their name is named after their grandson in the same manner.

Usually Jakun people are referred to as quiet, kind and timid people. They have dislike of strangers and try to avoid contact with them. The Aboriginal Peoples Act of 1954, which, with some changes, continues to operate today, contributes to the preservation of the barrier between Orang Asli and other groups of the population. The law defines the criteria by which a person may be considered Orang Asli, the main of which one belongs to an indigenous community and their adherence to traditional customs, language, beliefs and lifestyles. However, Jakun people often interact with other Orang Asli groups, as well as Chinese and Malay people, and residents of the surrounding villages. Occasionally, there are mixed marriages.

== Preservation of traditional knowledge ==
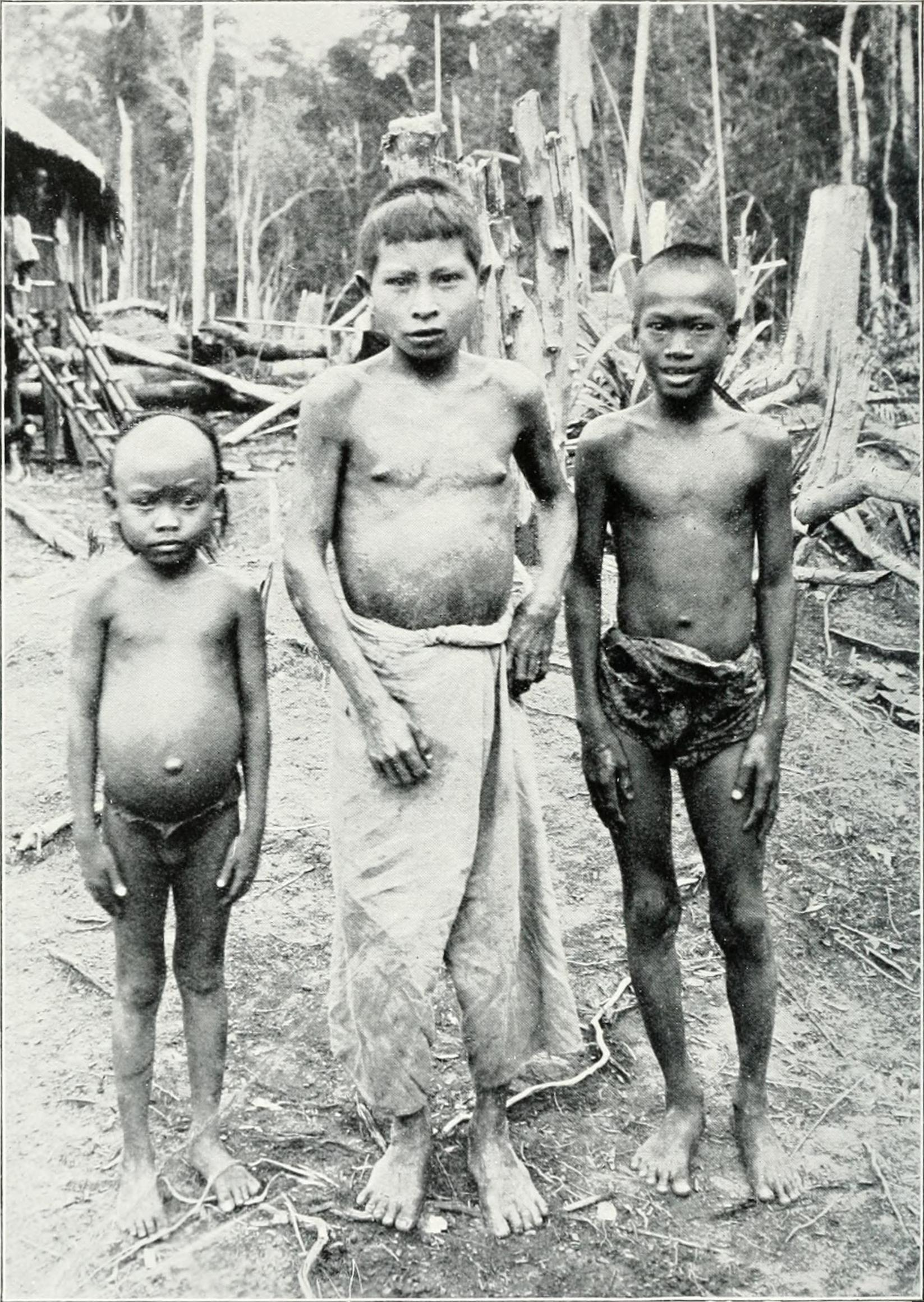
Three Jakun boys, Ulu Batu Pahat, Johor, 1906.

The Orang Asli have formed a distinctive culture. Living in wet tropical jungles, they have a high level of knowledge about the environment, formed on the basis of empirical experience. This knowledge is inherited from their ancestors and passed from generation to generation. Loss of jungles, degradation of the natural environment and change in the way of life of the Jakun people lead to the loss of their traditional knowledge and skills, and with them, to the loss of their identity as a separate people. The wanderings through the jungle bring moral satisfaction and pleasant memories to the older generation, but for the young people it is a forgotten tradition.

Some international and Malaysian organizations are attempting, on a commercial basis, to introduce activities based on traditional knowledge and skills of the people in Jakun communities. An example could be the introduction of cultivation of local medicinal plants of commercial value, the production of mats for sale, rugs from Pandan leaves, baskets handbags and so forth.

The Jakun people, possessing traditional knowledge and having the appropriate experience, can make a significant contribution to the conservation of jungles. In general, they have a positive attitude to these processes, but it is specific. On one hand, the jungle is in their blood, they perceive it as a refuge of their traditional knowledge, as their heritage. On the other hand, the jungle for them is a source of livelihood. Therefore, they consider the conservation of jungles as a guarantee of the well-being of their future generations. Hence, the Jakun people do not perceive nature conservation in the sense of restricting activities in the jungle. They refer to these problems purely from practical considerations and the conservation of jungles is considered from the point of view of quantitative assessment of the benefits that they will derive from.

== Notes ==
=== Bibliography ===
- Walter William Skeat & Charles Otto Blagden (1906), Pagan Races of the Malay Peninsula: Preface. Introduction. pt. 1. Race. pt. 2. Manners and customs. Appendix. Place and personal names, Macmillan and Company, Limited, OCLC 574352578
- Edward Green Balfour, ed. (1873), Cyclopædia of India and of Eastern and Southern Asia, Commercial, Industrial and Scientific: Products of the Mineral, Vegetable and Animal Kingdoms, Useful Arts and Manufactures, Volume 3, Printed at the Scottish & Adelphi presses, OCLC 246685387
- Muhammad Adha Shaleh; Miriam Karen Guth; Syed Ajijur Rahman (2016), "Local Understanding of Forest Conservation in Land Use Change Dynamics: Evidence from the Orang Asli Jakun Community Living in Tropical Peat Swamp Forest, Pahang, Malaysia", International Journal of Environmental Planning and Management, 2 (2), American Institute of Science: 6–14, ISSN 2381-7240
