= Proto-Malay =

Indigenous ethnic group of the Malay Archipelago

Malaysia: Melayu Asli, Melayu Purba Indonesia: Melayu Tua, Melayu Kuno
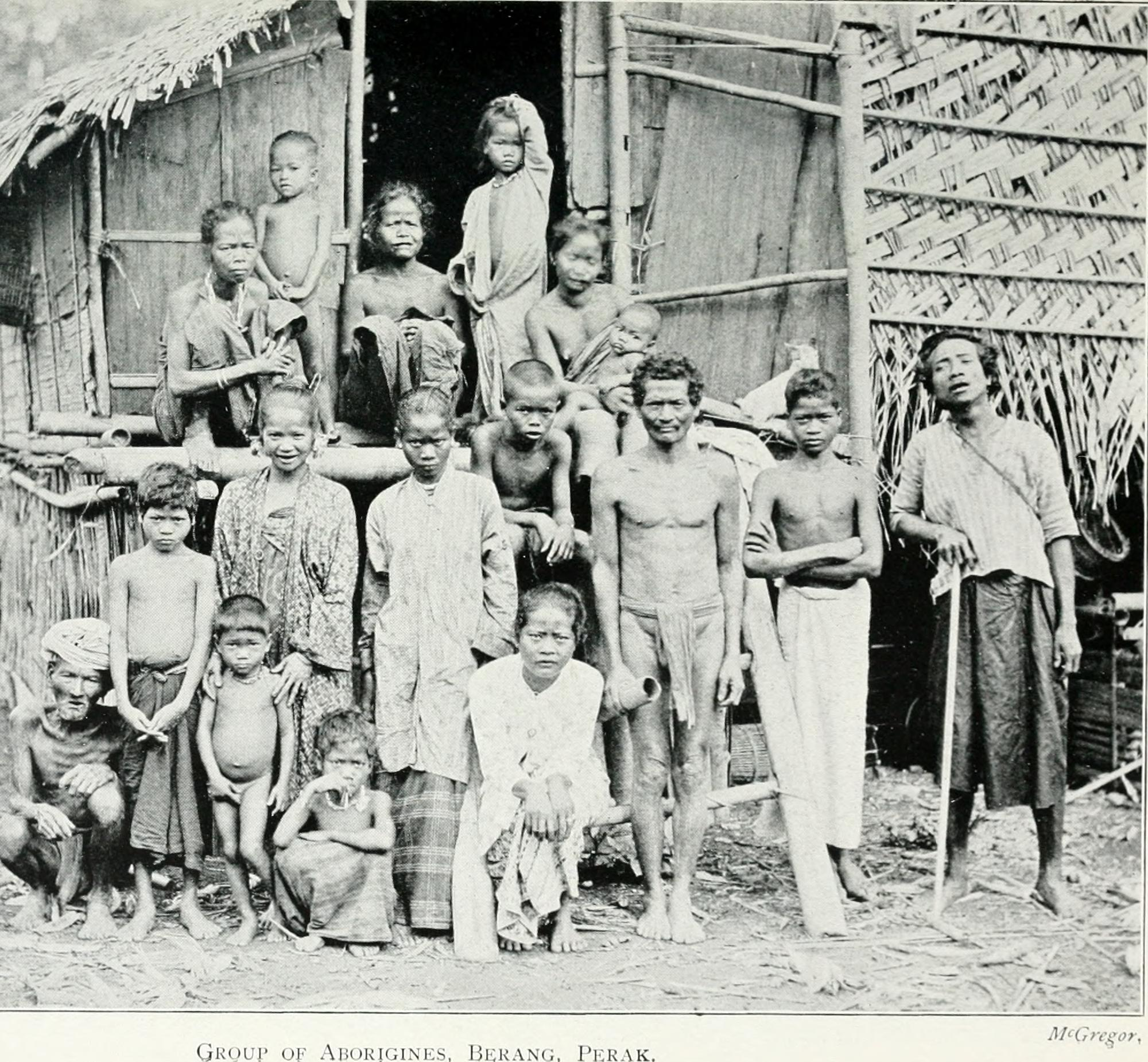
- A group of Proto-Malay Aboriginal people in Behrang, Perak, Malaysia, 1906.

Regions with significant populations
- Malay Archipelago
- Indonesia: c. 13,000,000–15,000,000 (2010)
- Malaysia: 65,189 (2010)

Languages
- Malayic languages, Semelaic languages, Batak languages, Dayak languages, Indonesian language, Malaysian language, English language

Religion
- Animism, Islam, Christianity

Related ethnic groups
- Senoi (Semaq Beri people, Mah Meri people), Orang laut, Malays (ethnic group), Native Indonesians, Malagasy people

The term Proto-Malay, which translates to Melayu Asli (aboriginal Malay) or Melayu Purba (ancient Malay) or Melayu Tua (old Malay), refers to Austronesian speakers who moved from mainland Asia, to the Malay Peninsula and Malay Archipelago in a long series of migrations between 2500 and 1500 BCE, before that of the Deutero-Malays about a thousand years later. The Proto-Malays have ancestry of the first humans living in Southeast Asia.

The Proto-Malays are believed to have been seafarers knowledgeable in oceanography who possessed advanced fishing as well as basic agricultural skills. Over the years, they settled in various places and adopted various customs and religions as a result of acculturation and inter-marriage with most of the people they came in contact with, such as the Semang and Senoi peoples.

== Origin ==
The Encyclopedia of Malaysia: Early History has pointed out three theories of the origin of the Proto-Malay:

- The Yunnan theory, Mekong river migration (first published in 1889). The theory of Proto-Malay originating from Yunnan is supported by R.H Geldern, J.H.C Kern, J.R Foster, J.R Logen, Slametmuljana and Asmah Haji Omar. Other evidence that supports this theory includes: stone tools found at Malay Archipelago which are analogous to Central Asian tools; similarity between Malay and Assam customs; and the fact that the Malay and Cambodian languages are kindred languages because the ancestral home of Cambodians originated at the source of Mekong River.
- The seafarers theory (first published in 1965).
- The Taiwan theory (first published in 1997). For more information, see Austronesian peoples and Austronesian languages.

Some historical linguists have concluded that there is scant linguistic basis for a Proto-/Deutero-Malay split. The findings suggests that the Proto-Malay and the Deutero-Malay peoples possibly come from the same origin. Previous theories suggested that the Deutero-Malays came in a second wave of migration, around 300 BCE, compared to the arrival of the Proto-Malays who came much earlier.

== Geographical regions ==
=== Indonesia ===
Ernest-Théodore Hamy (1896) first identified 3 Proto-Malay groups that are found in Sumatra and Borneo, Indonesia:

- Batak people
- Dayak people
- Nias people

Both Koentjaraningrat and Alfred Russel Wallace's (1869) research also concluded that most of the Moluccans came under the Proto-Malay classification with a admixture with Melanesian. However, António Mendes Correia's findings re-classified the Timorese in Alfred Russel Wallace's ethnological chart as predominantly Proto-Malay. This is evidenced by the striking similarity in the architectural designs of traditional houses in Lospalos, East Timor with the Batak and Toraja people. In Sulawesi, not only are the Toraja people are regarded as part of the ancient Proto-Malay, but their neighboring Minahasan people as well who have migrated to the island in the megalithic period. In Sumatra, a little known pygmy tribe called the Mante people of Aceh are regarded as Proto-Malay and are thought to be extinct.

Other ethnic groups that are closely related to the Proto-Malay are such as the Nage people from Flores, which are considered a mixture of Proto-Malay and Melanesian and the Sakai people from Riau, which were originally pure Proto-Malay until later they were forced into the interior by the Deutero-Malays which led to their mixing with the Negritos. Off the west coast of Bengkulu, Sumatra Island, the indigenous people of Enggano Island known as the Enggano people are considered largely Proto-Malays.

=== Malaysia ===
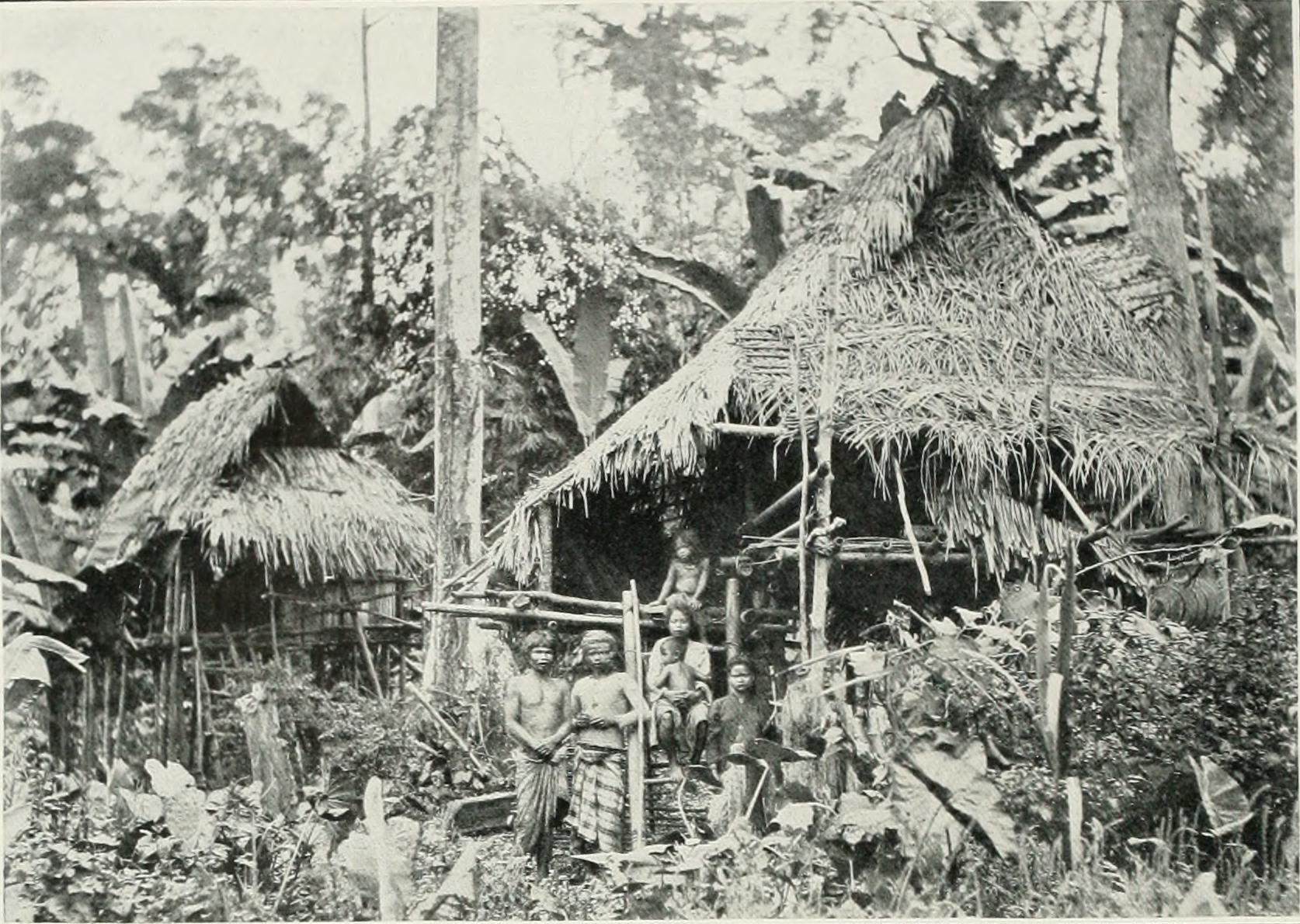
Houses of Proto-Malays near Lubuk Kelubi, Hulu Langat District, Selangor, Malaysia, 1908.

In Malaysia, the Proto-Malay are classified under the native Orang Asli group of people in the Peninsular Malaysia. They are officially known as:

- Jakun people
- Orang Kanaq
- Orang Kuala
- Orang Laut
- Orang Seletar
- Semelai people
- Temoq people
- Temuan people

Other ethnic groups outside of the Peninsular Malaysia that are also regarded as Proto-Malay apart from the Orang Asli people group are such as the Rungus people.

=== The Philippines ===
In modern scholarship, the classification of Philippine ethnic groups as "Proto-Malay" is considered an obsolete anthropological category. Contemporary research in genetics, linguistics, and archaeology instead places the settlement of the Philippines within the broader context of the Austronesian expansion.

==== Modern scientific consensus ====
According to the out of Taiwan model, Austronesian-speaking populations migrated south into the Philippines approximately 4,000–5,000 years ago. These groups did not arrive in distinct, sequential "waves" as theorized in the early 20th century, but through complex, multi-directional maritime networks.

A 2021 genomic study by Larena et al. demonstrated that Cordilleran populations (such as the Bontoc and Ifugao) possess high levels of basal Austronesian ancestry. This research indicates these groups are genetically distinct from the populations historically labeled as "Malay" in the southern archipelago.

Groups formerly categorized as "Proto-Malay" speak languages belonging to the Northern Luzon languages and other Philippine languages branch. These languages evolved independently over millennia and are not "mixtures" of Malay and other ethnic groups.

== Historical perspectives and misconceptions ==
=== 20th-century "Waves of Migration" theory ===
In the early 20th century, anthropologist H. Otley Beyer popularized the "Waves of Migration" theory. This model categorized Philippine ethnic groups based on perceived physical traits and arrival sequences, often using the 1918 Census of the Philippine Islands (published 1921) as a framework. Under this now-discredited theory, several groups were labeled as "Proto-Malay" or "mixtures":

- Mangyan people and Manguangan
- Bontoc, Ifugao, and Tinggian (historically described as "mainly Malay")
- Apayao, Teduray, and Batak (historically described as mixtures of Proto-Malay and Native Indonesian or Negrito)

Modern scholars view this classification as part of the historiographical development of Philippine anthropology rather than an accurate ethnographic or biological description.

== See also ==
- Prehistoric Malaysia
- Melayu Kingdom, a Melayu Kuno kingdom
