= Boat people (disambiguation) =

Boat people are the Vietnamese who fled South Vietnam.

Boat people may also refer to:

== People ==
- Boat people (Hong Kong) or Tanka people
- Boat people, Rohingya people fleeing Burma by sea during the 2015 refugee crisis
- Người Tàu, an alternative name for Hoa people
- Balseros, the name given to boat people who fled Cuba in self-constructed or precarious vessels.
- Haitian boat people, refugees who ride boats from Haiti to the United States or the Bahamas.

== Other uses ==
- Boat People (1982 film), a Hong Kong film about Vietnamese refugees in the territory
- Boat People (2023 film), a Canadian animated short film
- The Boat People (band), an indie pop band from Australia

== See also ==
- Fisherman
- Sailor
- Sea Gypsies (disambiguation), various ethnicities who live largely or principally on boats
