= Water tribe =

Water tribe or Water tribes may refer to:

== People ==
- Bajau people, an ethnic group of the southern Philippines
- Bhishti, a Muslim community in northern India and Pakistan
- Moken, an Austronesian ethnic group

== Fictional tribes ==
- Water Tribe in the Avatar: The Last Airbender franchise
- Water Tribe in the Bionicle universe
- Water Tribe, a faction in Chouseishin Gransazer

== See also ==
- Sea Gypsies (disambiguation)
