= Orang Kanaq language =

Aboriginal Malay language

Orang Kanaq
- Pronunciation: [ˈoraŋ ˈkanaʔ]
- Native to: Malaysia
- Ethnicity: Orang Kanaq
- Native speakers: 80 (2007)
- Language family: Austronesian: Malayo-Polynesian; Malayic; Malay?; Orang Kanaq

Language codes
- ISO 639-3: orn
- Glottolog: oran1258
- ELP: Orang Kanaq
- Orang Kanaq is classified as Severely Endangered by the UNESCO Atlas of the World's Languages in Danger

Orang Kanaq is one of the Malayic languages, grouped under the Austronesian languages. It is spoken by the Orang Kanaq, one of the 19 Orang Asli groups in Peninsular Malaysia. The language is believed to have been extinct since the 1950s according to the UNESCO Atlas of the World's Languages in Danger.

A variant of Malay, Orang Kanaq is distinct from the dialects spoken by ethnic Malays living near them. All members of the Orang Kanaq tribe understand the language; however, its lexicon has been largely influenced by the Malay language.

== See also ==
- Orang Asli
- Austronesian Languages
- Malay Languages
- Aboriginal Malay languages
- List of endangered languages in Asia
