= Moklenic languages =

Austroneasian language branch

Moklenic
- Moken–Moklen
- Geographic distribution: Mergui Archipelago; Myanmar; Peninsular Thailand
- Ethnicity: Moken people, Moklen people
- Linguistic classification: Austronesian: Malayo-Polynesian; Greater North Borneo?; Moklenic
- Proto-language: Proto-Moklenic (Proto-Moken-Moklen)
- Subdivisions: Moken; Moklen

Language codes
- Glottolog: moke1241

The Moklenic or Moken–Moklen languages consist of a pair of two closely related but distinct languages, namely Moken and Moklen. Larish (1999) establishes the two languages as forming two distinct subgroups of a larger Moken–Moklen branch. Larish (2005) suggests Moklenic as an alternative name for Moken–Moklen, the latter term which was originally used by Larish (1999).

== Languages ==
There are two Moklenic languages.

- Moken, spoken by about 2,500-3,000 Moken people or "Sea Gypsies" of Thailand and Myanmar.
- Moklen, spoken by 2,500-3,000 Moklen people of southern Thailand.

Moken and Moklen are linguistically and culturally related but distinct from each other, with Moken speakers primarily being sea-based hunter-gatherers, while Moklen speakers are land-based people living in villages and towns of southern Thailand (Larish 2005). Comparative studies of Moken and Moklen include those of Leerabhandh (1984), Makboon (1981), and Larish (1999).

The Moklenic languages are spoken along a 650-kilometer stretch of the west coast of southern Myanmar and southern Thailand, from Tavoy Island, Myanmar, to Phi Phi Island, Thailand (Larish 2005). Moken has a very wide distribution, while Moklen is exclusively spoken on the western coast of southern Thailand. Moklen displays heavy Southern Thai influence and is more endangered than Moken.

Urak Lawoi’ is spoken by another group of Sea Gypsies in southern Thailand. It is one of the Malayic languages, and is not a Moklenic language. On Phuket Island, Urak Lawoi’ is in contact with Moken.

== External relationships ==
=== Larish (1999, 2005) ===
Larish (1999, 2005) considers Moklenic to be a sister of the Chamic and Malayic languages rather than as part of them. Moklenic languages have also been strongly influenced by Austroasiatic languages, with many of those Austroasiatic loanwords, such as 'bird', also found in Chamic.

Larish (1999) classifies the two languages Moken and Moklen as part of a larger Moklenic–Acehnese-Chamic-Malayic ("MACM") subgroup.

Moklenic–Acehnese-Chamic-Malayic

- "Funan"?
- Moklenic (displays *q > *k sound change)
  - Moken
  - Moklen
- Acehnese-Chamic-Malayic (displays *q > *h sound change)
  - Acehnese-Chamic
  - Malayic

While the Acehnese-Chamic-Malayic languages display a Proto-Malayo-Polynesian *q > *h sound change, Moklenic languages instead display a Proto-Malayo-Polynesian *q > *k sound change. In Duano, although belongs to the Malayic branch, *q changes into *k instead of usual *h (*qulu → Duano kulu, but Proto-Malayic *hulu), shared with Moklenic.

Larish (1999) also speculates that the unknown extinct language (or languages) of the Funan Empire in southern Vietnam may have been an early split from Proto-Moklenic–Acehnese-Chamic-Malayic.

=== Smith (2017) ===
In a recent classification of the western Malayo-Polynesian languages, Smith (2017: 459) argues based on phonological evidence that Moklenic is a primary branch from Proto-Malayo-Polynesian.

== Reconstruction ==
Proto-Moken-Moklen has been reconstructed by Larish (1999).
