= The Water Gipsies =

The Water Gipsies may refer to:

- The Water Gipsies (novel), a 1930 British novel by A. P. Herbert
- The Water Gipsies (film), a 1932 British film adaptation directed by Maurice Elvey
- The Water Gipsies (musical), a 1955 stage version by A. P. Herbert and Vivian Ellis

== See also ==
- Sea Gypsies (disambiguation)
