= Sea Gypsies =

Sea Gypsies, Sea Gypsy, Sea People, Sea Nomads and Sea Nomad may refer to:

== Ethnography ==
- Sama-Bajau peoples, a collective name for several ethnic groups in the Philippines, Sabah, eastern Malaysia, Brunei, Indonesia, and parts of Sarawak
- Moken, an Austronesian ethnic group who maintain a nomadic, sea-based culture
- Orang Laut, a group of Malay people living in the Riau Islands of Indonesia
- Tanka people, an ethnic sub-group distinct form Han Chinese, that live on boats in Southern China
- Urak Lawoi, coastal dwellers of Thailand
- Jalia Kaibarta, an aboriginal Indian fishermen tribe
- Sjøreisande, a sea nomadic group, part of Norwegian Traveller community

== Other uses ==
- Badjao: The Sea Gypsies, a 1957 film directed by Philippine National Artist Lamberto V. Avellana and starring Rosa Rosal and Tony Santos, Sr.
- The Sea Gypsies (1978 film), starring Robert Logan and Heather Rattray
- "Gypsies of the sea", Alexander Dumas' description of Catalans in The Count of Monte Cristo

== See also ==
- Water tribe (disambiguation)
- "Ocean Gypsy", a song by Renaissance
- The Water Gipsies (disambiguation)
- Seasteading
