= Moken language =

Austronesian language spoken in southern Thailand and in western Burma

Moken
- Selung, Mawken, Basing, Selong, Salong, Salon, Chau Ko', Moklen
- Native to: Thailand, Myanmar
- Region: Southeast Asia
- Ethnicity: Moken
- Native speakers: 6,000 worldwide (2010)
- Language family: Austronesian: Malayo-Polynesian; Moklenic; Moken

Language codes
- ISO 639-3: mwt
- Glottolog: moke1242
- ELP: Moken

Moken is a Malayo-Polynesian language spoken by inhabitants in southern Myanmar and Southern Thailand, who refer to themselves as Moken (people) and Mawken.

== Classification ==
The language is closely related to the Moklen language, and can be mistaken to be similar to Urak Lawoi' but is in actuality distantly related. They are also regarded as "sea people" as the speakers are primarily concentrated within the Andaman Sea.

== History ==
An oral language, Moken is a Malayo-Polynesian language formed after the migration of the Austronesians from Taiwan 5,000–6,000 years ago, resulting in the development of this Austronesian language. While the population consists of 4,000 Moken, only an estimated 1,500 native speakers remain as of 2009, causing the language to be threatened with extinction.

== Endangerment ==
Out of the ethnic population, the main speakers of Moken are the elder generations as its lack of literacy becomes difficult in the transference of the language, however its lack of literacy has also helped conserve the language. Their title of "sea people" alludes to their grand knowledge of the sea, as that was their way of migration, and the traditional lifestyle of remaining within villages has built generations of marine and forest knowledge as well as boating skills. The advantages of their lifestyle were capitalised when the Surin Islands, where a great many Moken reside, experienced a great tsunami in December 2004 as their ancestors have integrated legends of the "seven rollers" and the "laboon" (giant wave).

== Geographic distribution ==
The language of Moken is spoken in Myanmar and Thailand, and its derived languages are spoken around the Andaman Sea.

== Dialects/Varieties ==
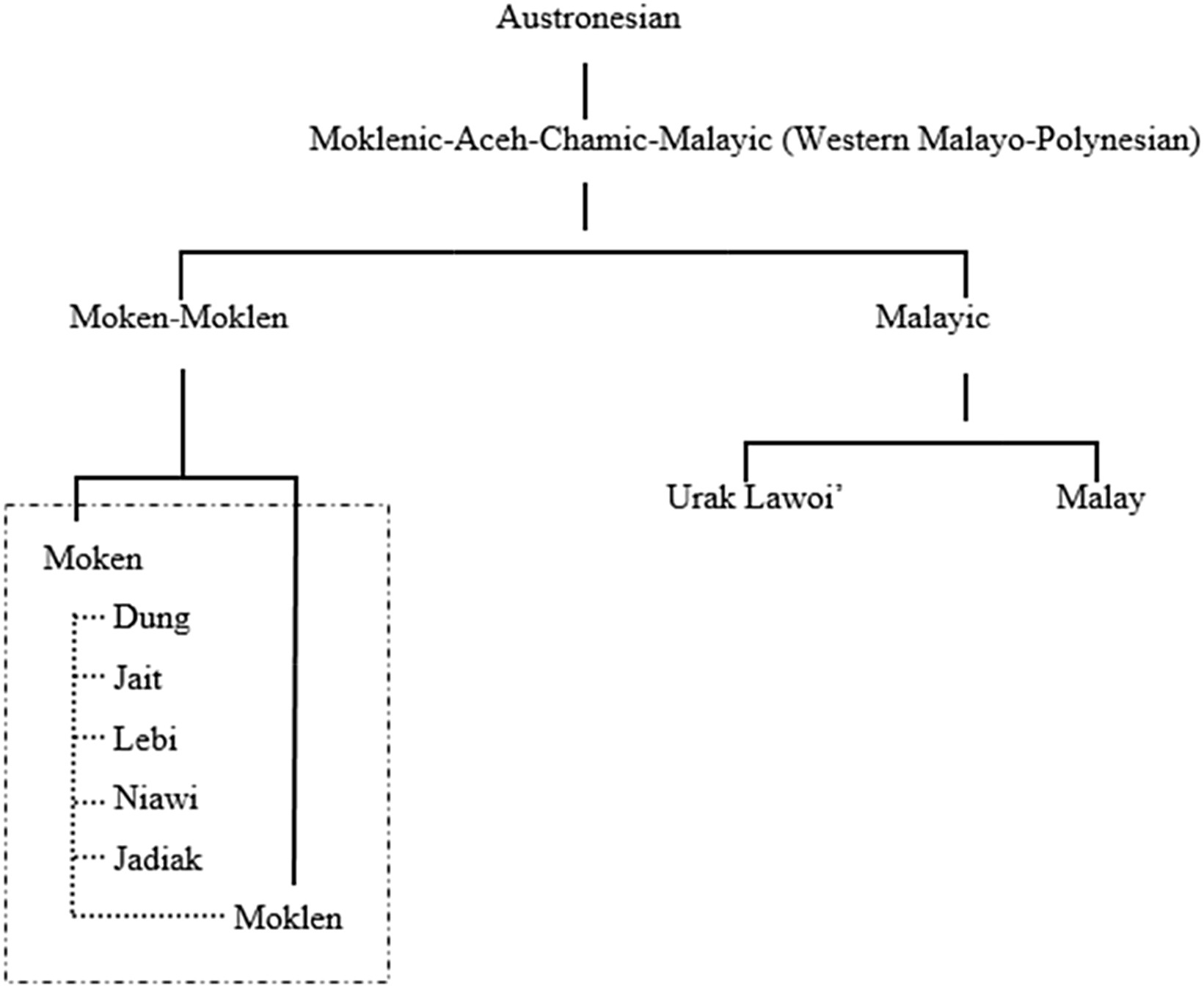

- Dung (635 speakers), spoken in Myanmar
- Jait (331 speakers), spoken in Myanmar
- Lebi, L'be (980 speakers), spoken in Myanmar
- Niawi, spoken in Myanmar
- Jadiak, spoken in Thailand

Dung, Jait, Lebi, and Niawi are spoken in Myanmar, and Jadiak in Thailand. The Burmese varieties have not been adequately investigated.

== Phonology ==
Consonants of Moken
		Labial	Alveolar	Palatal	Velar	Glottal
Nasal		m	n	ɲ	ŋ	
Plosive	plain	p	t	c	k	ʔ
Plosive	aspirated	pʰ	tʰ	cʰ	kʰ	
Plosive	voiced	b	d	ɟ	g	
Fricative			s			h
Rhotic			(r)			
Approximant		w	l	j		

The phonemic status of /r/ is described as 'highly questionable' and it is likely an allophone of /d/. In the Surin Island dialect, [ɾ] and [r] are described as intervocalic allophones of /d/.

Vowels of Moken
	Front	Central	Back
Close	i, iː		u, uː
Close-mid	e, eː	ə	o, oː
Open-mid	ɛ, ɛː		ɔ, ɔː
Open		a, aː	
Diphthong	iə		uə

/i/ has the allophone [ɪ] in closed syllables and /ɛ/ has the allophone [æ] in open syllables.

=== Phonotactics ===
Moken has a maximum CVC syllable structure. Consonant clusters are usually forbidden, which can be seen by the adaptation of loanwords (E.g. Thai nangsui → Moken lasiː ('book')) All consonants can occur syllable-initially, but in coda position only /m/, /n/, /ŋ/, /p/, /t/, /k/, /ʔ/, /h/, /w/ and /j/ can occur.

Moken mostly consists of disyllabic words., however two-syllable words are frequently reduced to monosyllabic form through the optional deletion of unaccented initial syllables in actual connected speech.

=== Intonation and stress ===
The Moken language follows similar to English phonology regarding intonation in sentences. Rising contour intonations occur when saying sentences that end as questions or as exclamations. Falling contour intonations are used within regular sentences.

When it comes to two words in Moken that are pronounced in sequences; the first word will maintain a level intonation and the second word ends with a rising intonation.

In terms of syllables, monosyllabic words with have a levelled amount of stress throughout pronunciation; while words composed of a prefixed syllable and a major syllable will have stress placed on the major syllable. In other words, the last syllable will always be stressed and its absence gives clue to word breaks.

== Morphology ==
=== Verbal derivation ===
Moken verbs are derived from nouns, which usually start with a non-nasal consonant, by changing the initial consonant to a nasal. For example:

cəkuːt ('rudder') → ɲəkuːt ('to steer')

cʰɔbaŋ ('earring') → ŋɔbaŋ ('to put on earring')

cʰuju:k ('pointing finger') → luju:k ('to point')

ʔɔbat ('medicine') → ŋɔbat ('to medicate')

cəcik ('scale (fish)') → məcik ('to scale a fish')

solaːy ('comb') → ɲolaːy ('to comb')

kapiːt ('claw (crab)') → ŋapiːt ('to clip, to pinch')

pəjaːn ('fishing net') → məjaːn ('to throw a net')

Although nasals are indicative of verbs, many Moken verbs do not possess an initial nasal, e.g. kehaʔ ('to feel distressed, to be busy'), kəboːk ('to be lazy') and toloŋ ('to help').

The adaptation of loanwords into Moken show a verbal prefix ma-/mə-, e.g. Thai thām → Moken məthaːm ('to ask for') and Thai ān → Moken maːn ('to read'). This prefix is likely a cognate with the Malay prefix məN- (meng-) and thus the reconstructed Proto-Malayo-Polynesian prefix *maN-, which are also used as a verbal prefix. This derivation method seems to no longer be productive, as more recent Thai loanwords do not carry the prefix.

=== Nominal derivation ===
Similarly to the verbal prefix, a nominal prefix kʰa- is found in Moken, e.g. Thai muək → Moken kʰamuək ('hat'). This morpheme also appears to have lost its productivity.

A male name marker ʔa- and a female name marker ʔi- are obligatory before Moken and Moklen names, unless a kinship term is used.

A phonologically reduced form of the numeral 'one' ʔa- is used as prefix, functioning as an indefinite article.

== Bibliography ==
- Bradley, David (2007). "East and Southeast Asia". In Moseley, Christopher (ed.). Encyclopedia of the World's Endangered Languages. London: Routledge. pp. 349–424.
- Chantanakomes, V. (1980). A Description of Moken: A Malayo-Polynesian Language (Master's thesis). Mahidol University.
- Dancause, Kelsey Needham; Chan, Chim W; Arunotai, Narumon Hinshiranan; Lum, J Koji (2009). "Origins of the Moken Sea Gypsies Inferred from Mitochondrial Hypervariable Region and Whole Genome Sequences". Journal of Human Genetics. 54 (2): 86–93. doi:10.1038/jhg.2008.12.
- Kraisame, Sarawut (2018). "Language Endangerment and Community Empowerment: Experience Form Community Training in the Moken Language Documentation and Preservation Project". Kasetsart Journal of Social Sciences. 39 (2): 244–253. doi:10.1016/j.kjss.2017.05.002.
- Larish, Michael (2005). "Moken and Moklen". In Adelaar, Alexander; Himmelmann, Nikolaus P. (eds.). The Austronesian Languages of Asia and Madagascar. London: Routledge. pp. 513–533. ISBN 0-7007-1286-0.
- Naw Say Bay (1995). "The Phonology of the Dung Dialect of Moken". In Bradley, D. (ed.). Papers in Southeast Asian Linguistics No. 13: Studies in Burmese Languages. Canberra: Pacific Linguistics. pp. 193–205. doi:10.15144/PL-A83.193. ISBN 0-85883-427-8.
- Pittayaporn, Pittayawat (2005). "Moken as a Mainland Southeast Asian language". In Grant, A.; Sidwell, P. (eds.). Chamic and Beyond: Studies in Mainland Austronesian Languages. Canberra: Pacific Linguistics. pp. 189–209. doi:10.15144/PL-569.189. ISBN 0-85883-561-4.
- UN/ISDR (2008). Indigenous Knowledge for Disaster Risk Reduction: Good Practices and Lessons Learnt from the Asia-Pacific Region.
