= Orang Kanaq =

Orang Kanaq Orang Kanak / Kanak people
Total population
- 238 (2010, Population & Housing Census)

Regions with significant populations
- Malaysia
- Johor: 139 (2010, JHEOA)

Languages
- Orang Kanaq, Malay

Religion
- No religious system (originally and predominantly), Christianity, Islam

Related ethnic groups
- Jakun people, Orang Kuala, Orang Seletar, Temuan people, Orang Laut

Orang Kanaq are one of the 18 Orang Asli ethnic groups in Malaysia. They are classified under the Proto-Malay people group, which forms the three major people group of the Orang Asli. The Orang Kanaq are considered as the smallest Orang Asli group with a population of approximately 90 people only.

Despite its negligible numbers, most representatives of the micro-ethnos have well maintained their identity. However, the sad dynamics of the Kanaq people's population show that there is a real threat of disappearance over their unique language and culture. It continues to exist only because of the low level of contact with other people since its traditions do not approve of mixed marriages with other ethnic groups.

Indigenous inhabitants of Peninsular Malaysia have a special status, which is enshrined in the legislation of the country. They use the special term Orang Asli, which means "ancient inhabitants", "original peoples", "first peoples", "aborigines" in the Malay language. They were sponsored by the state Department of Orang Asli Development (JAKOA) until 2011 when it became the Department of Orang Asli Affairs (Jabatan Hal Ehwal Orang Asli, JHEOA). The purpose of the department is to raise the living standard of the indigenous people to the country's average.

The Orang Asli do not form a united community, but it is a conglomerate of different origins, culture, way of life, language and racial features of tribes and peoples. For ease of administration, JHEOA divides them into 18 tribes, uniting in 3 groups of 6 tribes in each. This group are the Negritos, the Senoi and the Proto-Malays. Kanaq people belong to the last of them.

Despite belonging to the indigenous population, the Kanaq people are relatively recent inhabitants of the country. They have lived on the Malay Peninsula for only about 200 years. Their motherland is the islands of the Riau-Lingga Archipelago located further south, within the present-day Indonesia. There, on a small island, Daik, that is still inhabited by a tribe of Sekanak people, which is believed to be related to the Kanaq people of Peninsular Malaysia.

The Kanaq people are the least studied group of Orang Asli. Usually, they avoid contact with other people and so researchers have paid little attention to them. Only recently have Malaysian scholars published a number of materials devoted to this tribe.

The spoken language of the Orang Kanaq resembles Malay but with a distinct coarse accent. Its population of the Orang Kanaq is dwindling, bit according to the Center of Orang Asli Concern, the Orang Kanaq language has still managed to survive.

== Settlement area ==
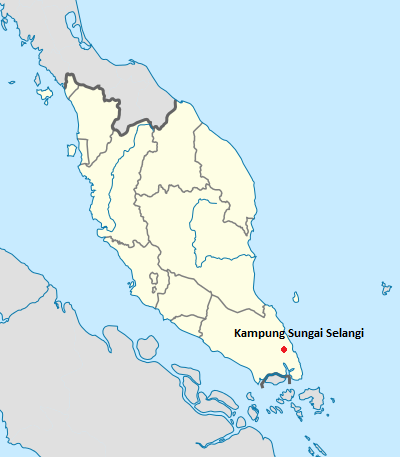
Location of Kampung Sungai Selangi in Malaysia.

Currently, they are situated at Kampung Sungai Selangi, located northeast of Mawai, within the Kota Tinggi District, in the eastern Johor state. Out of the 147,412 Orang Asli from 18 tribes in Malaysia, the Kanaq people make up the smallest number. The inhabitants of the Sungai Selangi village comprise 87 Orang Kanaq people, including 3 Malays, from 23 families. The village took shape in 1965, with only 40 Kanaq residents from 10 families. In addition to them, only a few Malay people live in Sungai Selangi.

== Population ==
The data available in various sources allow to a certain extent to observe the dynamics of the Kanaq people's population:-

Year	1952 (Williams-Hunt)	1960	1965	1969	1974	1980	1996	2000	2003	2004	2008	2010
Population	34	38	40	40	36	37	64	73	83	83	85	139 (JHEOA) / 238 (Population & Housing Census)

The census, conducted in 2008 among the Orang Asli communities in the state of Johor's local Department of Orang Asli Affairs (JHEOA), Johor Bahru, covering five major groups of Proto-Malay's Jakun, Orang Seletar, Orang Kuala, Temuan and Kanaq people. The census showed that the Kanaq people are the smallest of these five groups, with only 85 people, or 0.72% of the total Proto-Malay's population of 11,701 individuals. All of them; 23 families, are residents of the Selangi village.

According to the Department of Orang Asli Affairs (JHEOA) in 2010, 29 families of Kanaq people lived in Malaysia numbered at 139 people (2010, JHEOA). They made up 0.18% of the Proto-Malay people and 0.1% of the Orang Asli's total population.

== Language ==
They speak Orang Kanaq language, which belongs to the Malay group of Austronesian languages. Little is explored about the Orang Kanaq language. In the early 2000s, Mohammad Sharifudin Yusof in the course of field research, for the first time he composed a list of words of the Orang Kanaq language and presented it in phonetic form. Using these records, the reader will be able to pronounce Kanaq words correctly, even if one has never spoken to native a speaker.

In general, Orang Kanaq language is very similar to Malay language, especially in vocabulary and sound system, but it has a special accent and some other features. Sometimes it's called a coarse dialect of Malay language.

Most Kanaq people speak their native language well. But Orang Kanaq language is under increasing pressure from the standard Malay language, this tendency is especially noticeable among the younger generation. Malay language for the Kanak people is the language of schooling. Given the small number of Orang Kanaq language speakers, it can be argued that it is in serious danger of disappearance.

== Religion ==
Most Kanaq people continue to adhere to traditional beliefs, which are a complex set of different cults and rituals. They believe in the existence of spirits and souls, believe in the power of spirits, which, if necessary, become a source of help for them. Numerous taboos, passed from generation to generation, regulate the daily lives of Kanaq people. These people have a whole set of myths and legends associated with faith in supernatural deities. Traditional shamans act as mediums that communicate with invisible forces.

As a result of missionary activity, part of the Kanak population has already adopted Islam or Christianity. Joshua Project estimates the religious composition of the tribal members as follows: 81% support traditional beliefs, 15% Muslims, 4% Christians. At the same time, JHEOA statistics say that almost all Kanaq people are Muslims: 65 people in 1997. Islamization of the people is associated with active government policy in this direction, which was carried out in the 1980s.

== History ==
=== As part of the Orang Laut ===
The Orang Kanaq were originally one of the Sea Gypsy peoples, a group of sea nomads and pirates from the Riau-Lingga archipelago located on the east of Sumatra, Indonesia. It is believed that the Kanaq people originated from the small island of Pulau Sekanak located in this archipelago, in the north of Batam Island, Indonesia.

Orang laut played an important role in the history of the Malaysian statehood. The special relationship between the Orang laut and the Malay rulers developed during the time of the Srivijaya empire (7th-11th centuries). In this state, sea nomads served as the navy. For hundreds of years, the loyalty of the Orang laut to the Malay rulers was a decisive factor in the preservation and prosperity of the state. These special relationships were inherited in the 14th century by the Malacca Sultanate, and then followed by its successor, the Johor Sultanate. The Orang laut continued to occupy prominent positions in the Johor Empire in the 17th-18th centuries. In particular, the Orang Kanaq tribe is mentioned in the legendary Malay Annals. At the beginning of the 19th century, mentions of the Kanaq people are found in the notes of European researchers, in particular Logan (Logan, 1847).

The 1699 rebellion in Johor brought an illegitimate ruler to power and destroyed the established relationship between the Sultan and the Orang laut. The latter did not recognize the new government and began, to some extent, to take uncontrollable piracy. Tribes of sea nomads have changed the place of their disposition several times. In particular, the Orang Kanaq tribe was attested in Sekana Bay on the northern shore of the island of Singkep in the Lingga Islands. They were headed by a man (leader of the tribes of the Lingga Islands's Orang laut) by the name of Panglima Raman. The overlords of the Kanaq people were rulers of the Bintan-Lingga Sultanate, dependent on the Johor Sultanate. The tribe is mentioned in those days as not very skillful pirates, who in their predatory campaigns reached the shores of Siam and Cochinchina.

The further political situation was not in favor of the Orang laut. At the end of the eighteenth century, the Siak Sultanate, ruler from the east coast of Sumatra, summoned the service of the Ilanun (Iranun people), which significantly outperformed the Orang laut in the naval affairs. Another important trend in the region was the strengthening of the position of Europeans, primarily Dutch and English colonials, who in the 19th century already firmly established in the Strait of Malacca. Europeans had inappropriate piracy in the region, and they began to carry out military operations against the Iranun people and Orang laut. In 1843 an action was carried out on the "reconciliation" of the Kanaq people. Lingga Sultanate, at the request of the Dutch, persuaded them to stop pursuing piracy. In the same year, Dutch troops destroyed the Kanaq settlement in Sekana Gulf, forcing the tribe to move deeper into the island. To demonstrate loyalty to the Sultan, the Kanaq people symbolically burned their boats and committed themselves to farming, which did not have any skills and abilities. They took the new occupation as forced labour (kerah in Malay language), that is, corvee.

After 1862, there were no more signs of the presence of the Kanaq people in the Gulf of Sekana (Sopher, 1965). Instead, they are mentioned in the list of Orang laut tribes, which were vassal of the Johor Sultanate. The Sultanate's then society was highly structured, each of the vassal tribes occupied a place strictly defined for it, which corresponded to the tribal status and obligated to perform certain duties in favor of the ruling Sultan. The Orang Kanaq's status was rather high, they ruled the Sultan's ships. At that time, the Kanaq people had their settlement near the island of Bintan, south of Singapore, but often had to leave their homes for a long time; and it could last for more than a year.

=== Relocation to Malay Peninsula ===
The date and reasons for the resettlement of the Kanaq people from Bintan to the Malay Peninsula remain unexplained. Different sources give contradictory dates, and the discrepancy between which is more than 100 years. One of the undocumented documents held in the archives of the Department of Orang Asli Affairs in Johor Bahru states that the first group of the Kanaq people numbering about 100 people was delivered by the Dutch to the Kota Tinggi District in 1758 to work on a black pepper plantation in the Sungai Papan village. After the plantation was closed, they moved to Lebak Mincin, a land awarded to them by the Sultan of Johor at the foothills of Gunung Panti and founded a new settlement here. There they began to grow fruit trees and collect forest products.

The Kanaq people themselves argue that their ancestors numbered about 150 people at one time sailed in small boats to the coast of Johor, climbed into the interior area of Sungai Sedili and stayed in the area Mawai Lama, and that was where they founded their settlement. In their view, the relocation from the Riau Islands, which they consider to be their homeland, was caused by the oppressive behavior of the Dutch colonials. They started to migrate to Malay Peninsula in around 1784 from Riau just before a Dutch resident was set up there in 1795. Fugitives have chosen Mawai Lama in the Kota Tinggi District because of its isolated location; here they could avoid contacts with outsiders, in relation to which they felt panic and fear. Other sources by the Kanaq people claimed that their ancestors had been relocated to Kota Tinggi by the Sultan of Johor himself. Such a statement has grounds, because at that time Johor began to engage in the commodity harvesting of rubber, which was in high demand in European markets. To carry out these works, the Sultan needed working labourers that he could easily obtain from his subjects. Apparently, the Kanak people worked as slave labourers in those rubber plantations. The dates of resettlement in Johor, of course, were not recorded.

In one way or another, the Kanak people consider Lebak Mincin as their new homeland, and it is here that their traditional forest lands are located. They are considered to be one of the country's earliest inhabitants even though they have been living on the Peninsula for only about 200 years.

=== Eviction in Selangor ===
Initially, the Kanaq people settled more or less calmly in the village at Mawai Lama, Kota Tinggi but until the times of the Malayan Emergency (1948-1960) they then relocated to Selayang, Gombak District during the 1950s, when the Malayan Communist Party rebels opposed the British authorities in Malaya. The rebels used assistance and support from indigenous Orang Asli people, the residents of the country's inland forest areas. In order to break off communications that are harmful to the government, the British authorities organized a resettlement of indigenous Orang Asli communities in the so-called "new villages", located in other regions controlled by the authorities in the country. The same fate fell on the Kanaq people as well. In 1951 they moved from Mawai Lama Aboriginal Research Center, to a village located in Sungai Gombak in the state of Selangor, 13 km from Kuala Lumpur.

The Kanaq people become experimental subjects in the hands of the special department in the Department of Aboriginal Affairs at the new place created in 1950. In order to "best preserve the natural environment", the Kanaq settlement, which occupied only 1.2 hectares of land, was covered with barbed wire around it and was placed under protection. The department employees were able to "study" this group of people and conduct experiments on them. As noted by Williams-Hunt, an employee of the department, the Mawai Lama Kanaq people grew almost nothing. Their traditional way of life included the collection of forest products, including rattan, wild yam and so on. In Sungai Gombak, they began to cultivate farming skills. Kanaq people had a very hard to become accustomed to the new conditions of living in camp environment, which led to many people ill and dying. According to the same Williams-Hunt, in 1953 only 40 Kanaq people survived there.

=== Return to Kota Tinggi ===
Realizing the complete failure of their resettlement policy, the British authorities in 1955 turned the Kanaq people back to Johor, in the same Kota Tinggi District, but several times they had to change their place of residence. Originally settled in the village of Semangar, the Kanaq people were dissatisfied with this settlement, because it was located only 230 meters from the settlement of Jakun people, another indigenous Orang Asli people of Peninsular Malaysia. They lived in Semangar until 1959, after which they moved to the Batu 9 in Jalan Mawai. Finally, in order to mitigate the situation, the government specially allocated Kanaq people for allocating 28 hectares of land for housing and agricultural land from the state reserve, and in the year 1964, 10 Kanaq families (about 40 people) settled in Sungai Selangi, where people still live.

The events of the Malayan Emergency marked the beginning of the modern history of indigenous Orang Asli peoples of Peninsular Malaysia. Since then, they have received serious attention from the government. Initially their affairs were dealt with by the Department of Aboriginal Affairs. After Malaysia received independence in 1957, this structure was transformed into the Department of Orang Asli Affairs, and after the reorganization in 2011 it became known as the Department of Orang Asli Development. As in the case of other indigenous Orang Asli communities, a special Field Assistant officer was assigned to the Kanaq people, who had to bring the decision of the government to the tribe. A representative from the tribe served as the elder.

== Culture ==
=== Lifelihood ===
The current Kanaq people are not at all like their ancestors- the seafarers, as they have long lost contact with sea life. However, agriculture remains alien to them; despite all the efforts of the state government to instill new skills for their welfare, Kanaq people never seriously did not treat their occupations with agriculture. They are more than happy with the traditional lessons related to the use of natural resources such as harvesting, hunting and fishing. In the area of Lebak Mincin, located 15 kilometers from their village in Sungai Selangi, the tribe has its own traditional jungle lands, the land of ancestors, called saka. This territory has the status of land reserves. There is a norm among Orang Asli where their mother-saka, is located in unoccupied places at a considerable distance from their permanent settlements. Periodically, especially during the ripening season of the fruit or when there is not much work in the village, the Kanaq people for a certain period of time would go to Lebak Mincin to collect "gifts" from the forest. In addition to fruit, they collect rattan in large quantities here, which are then sold through a middle-person. For their own needs, rattan is practically not used, unless what is available from it to make brooms.

The gathering of rattans in the life of the tribe is of paramount importance, since it is the main source of their income. In 1965 the Kanaq people collected as many as 20 trucks of rattan. The collection of this plant involves groups of families, which they would go together in the jungle for a few days. Before going into the woods, they would hold a great ceremony, spells, trying to receive blessings and protection from the jungle spirits in order to make a successful journey. The great distances that must be overcome and the reduction of rattan stocks due to its excessive cutting are the reasons why this occupation has become less attractive for the Kanaq people in recent years.

Fishing is also common, there are plenty of fish in local rivers. In addition, hunting of small wild animals in the jungle is carried out with the use of blowguns with poisonous darts.

The total area of land allocated for the settlement of Kanaq people is 27.92 hectares; namely, the village occupies only 0.6 hectares. The rest of the territory is used by the people to plant their crops, although the land is not fertile here. They grow cassava, sweet potatoes, yams, and most of these products are consumed in the same place.

In the past, the Orang Kanaq were slave workers tapping trees in rubber plantations. The government has repeatedly tried to attract Kanaq people, like other Orang Asli tribes, to produce plantation crops. At first, a small rubber plantation was created with an area of 3.02 hectares, in which each family received four rows of trees. But the Kanaq people did not show any interest in rubber tapping. The trees left growing without supervision, and eventually they were abandoned and infested with wild deer. In such condition was the plantation in 1964. Subsequently, the Kanaq people gave it to the local Chinese people. In 1983, the state company of Federal Land Consolidation and Rehabilitation Authority (FELCRA) started planting oil palm in an area of 24.74 hectares of plantation. The project was attended by 12 Kanaq families. Their income could be bigger if they worked on the plantation themselves. However, the tribe traditionally does not show any entrepreneurial initiative. Today, one of their main sources of income comes from their work in oil palm plantation managed by FELCRA.

The desire to get money from time to time prompts Kanaq men to get hired to work on neighbouring private plantations, logging companies, and state land projects. However, hired labour did not become a permanent occupation for them. There are situations when they abandon their work without notice, for example, during the season of maturation of fruits in the jungle. On the other hand, business employers are not always honest in their relations with the Kanaq people, where the money they earn is either not paid on time or not fully paid.

They are also lagging behind in modern technology and education and are still working as labourers in rubber and shrub plantations.

=== Housing ===
In recent years, the Kanaq people lived in cottages that looked more like chicken coops. But the state government under the program of Housing Maintenance Scheme (Skim Perumahan Kesejahteraan Rakyat, SPKR) has built 23 new housing huts in Sungai Selangi. This is standard for the Orang Asli design, a wooden cabin on stilts, but a reduced version of a typical rural Malay house, specially designed for this purpose by JHEOA authorities. This house includes two living rooms, a kitchen and an open veranda in front porch. The village is also provided with basic utilities and infrastructure such as clean water and electricity, and household appliances.

=== Society ===
All those who have encountered the Kanaq people have noticed their extraordinary reticence. They usually avoid contact with strangers. When they see outsiders on the street, the Kanaq women flee to their homes and watch from the windows until the stranger leaves their settlement. It takes years of contact to build trust with the Kanaq people. In general, the Kanaq people prefer to remain in the company exclusively among their own tribesmen.

To this should be added also the age-old tradition of tribal endogamy. The Kanaq people avoid marriages with outsiders. It is difficult for the close-knitted Orang Kanaq community to be separated as they avoid marrying outsiders. They believe that such unions will bring a curse on their tribesmen. On the other hand, this tradition has allowed them for many years to maintain their identity, despite the low birthrates that have caused their numbers to dwindle over the years.

The Orang Kanaq have long puzzled outsiders for being able to maintain their small population at 30-40 for generations. This is because they have practiced birth control with traditional methods by drinking a herbal drink called "jarak anak", and even more recently with modern medications.

The crowd is headed by a village head, or tok batin. He is a community representative in relations with the state government, he distributes help among members of the tribal community with the assistance they regularly receive from the government, he negotiates with outsiders who address specific issues in the community. The tok batin has the final say as a decisive factor in permitting the issuance of rattan cutting licenses and other work carried out within the jungle area reserved for the tribe. The position elected by seniority, but in real life, the position is usually inherited by a man's line.

It is difficult for the Kanaq people to form a relationship with other people. They, if not the largest of all indigenous Orang Asli peoples of Peninsular Malaysia, were once involved in the processes of forced relocation, restriction of freedom and free use of natural resources. This had negative consequences not only for the social and economic life of the community, but also for the moral state of these people. Mistrust of the government, sown in previous years, remains relevant to this day. This is one reason why JHEOA efforts to "modernize" the tribe were not very successful.

The Kanaq people traditionally have closer contact with Chinese traders who are called tauke as intermediaries, of whom they are trusted more than the government officials. In the early twentieth century these taukes provided the Kanaq people with the opportunity to sell the products that they gathered in the jungle. The local Chinese people continued to provide such services, besides giving out loans to those who are in debt, and hired them to work in their plantations. Middleman constantly tricked and cheated the Kanaq people, using their ignorance, and used them as cheap labour, and resell their products at a much higher price. Excessive dependence and trust in the local Chinese people is the reason that the Kanaq people are ready to sell to them their licenses issued by the Forest Department of Johor for harvesting and processing of jungle products.

=== Modernisation ===
The Malaysian government, through the Department of Orang Asli Development (JAKOA), is trying to change the lives of Kanaq people, to overcome their lagging socio-economic, and to implement specific community development programmes to this day. JAKOA and other institutions provide the Kanaq people with a variety of education, health care, financial assistance, agricultural subsidies and livestock subsidies, free housing and business opportunities. Almost every family has received from the state government some kind of domestic economy. Kanaq people also receive a share of FELCRA's palm oil sales, monthly free food, clothing and other basic necessities.

However, the Orang Asli themselves do not always have a positive response towards these transformations. In particular, the Kanaq people would rather avoid accepting them, and they continued their traditional way of life, had free access to their native land and jungles, and could hunt and collect timber there.

Nevertheless, in recent years, the efforts of government structures to integrate Kanaq people into the Malaysian society have begun to bring results. Asphalted roads were paved into the village, a mosque, a public hall and a kindergarten were built in Sungai Selangi. Parents began sending their children to a public school. Part of the Kanaq people have accepted Islam, and mixed marriages are no longer surprising. The standard of living of the people began to increase. Some members of the tribe bought motorcycles and electric home appliances began to appear in homes.

Unfortunately, the living standards of the Kanaq people are still very low, and the help they receive often does not have the desired effect. This is confirmed by the results of a survey conducted in 2012 between the two communities of Orang Asli in the state of Johor, namely, the Kanaq and Orang Kuala. Characteristically, Kanaq people by absolutely all indicators are considerably inferior to the Orang Kuala. The reason for this, according to specialists, is due to the lack of an appropriate interest among the Kanaq people themselves. These people are used to being small and feel comfortable with this. State aid provided to them for many years are mainly used to meet urgent needs. Such assistance cannot change the lives of people in such a way that they could provide themselves with consistent stable income and thereby have the opportunity to improve their financial position.

The same applies to the education system. Kanaq children attends public primary school (Sekolah Kebangsaan, SK) in Mawai and secondary school (Sekolah Menengah Kebangsaan, SMK) in Felda Bukit Aping Barat. However, their parents do not take seriously the importance of education, and therefore many children drop out of school, especially in the first few years of study.
