= Moklen language =

Austronesian language spoken in Thailand

Moklen
- Native to: Thailand
- Region: Phang Nga Province, Ranong Province, and northern Phuket Island
- Ethnicity: Moklen
- Native speakers: (2,000 cited 1984–2007)
- Language family: Austronesian: Malayo-Polynesian; Moklenic; Moklen

Language codes
- ISO 639-3: mkm
- Glottolog: mokl1243
- ELP: Moklen

Moklen is an Austronesian language spoken on the western coast of southern Thailand. It is related to but distinct from the Moken language of Myanmar and southern Thailand. Unlike Moken, it is not spoken in Myanmar.

== Dialects ==
Larish (2005) lists three main Moklen areas in Thailand. Moklen is spoken mostly, but not exclusively, in Phang Nga Province. It is also spoken in Ranong Province and Phuket Island.

- Northern Moklen area (eight villages): located about 40 km (25 mi) from the main concentration of Jadiak Moken speakers in Ranong Province, Thailand, ranging from the villages of Ko Phra Thɔɔng (เกาะพระทอง; in Khura Buri District) in the north to Baang Sak in the south. There is a high degree of interaction with Moken in the Ko Phra Thɔɔng area.
- Central Moklen area (nine villages): from Paak Wiip (in Takua Pa District) to Hin Laat. The Baan Dɔɔn Can dialect is the variety mainly studied by Larish (1999, 2005).
- Southern Moklen area (three villages): northern tip of Phuket Island.

Swastham (1982) describes the Moklen dialect of Lam Phi (ลำภี), Thai Mueang District, Phang Nga Province in southern Thailand. Other Moklen villages near Lam Phi listed by Swastham (1982) are, listed from north to south, Bang Sak, Khuk Khak, Bang Niang, Thung Maphraw, and Tha Chat Chai.

Bishop & Peterson (1987) survey various Moklen dialects.

== Works cited ==
- Bishop, N.; Peterson, M. M. (1987). A Preliminary Language Research Survey Report: The Moklen and Sakai Language Groups. Bangkok: Summer Institute of Linguistics.
- Larish, Michael (2005). "Moken and Moklen". In Adelaar, Alexander; Himmelmann, Nikolaus P. (eds.). The Austronesian Languages of Asia and Madagascar. London: Routledge. pp. 513–533. ISBN 0-7007-1286-0.
- Swastham, Pensiri (1982). A Description of Moklen: A Malayo-Polynesian Language in Thailand (MA thesis). Mahidol University.
