= Orang Kuala =

Duano' people Desin Duano' / Desin Dolak / Orang Kuala
Total population
- 19,000 (2006)

Regions with significant populations
- Strait of Malacca
- Indonesia: 17,500
- Jambi: 331
- Riau: n/a
- Riau Islands: n/a
- Malaysia (Johor): 3,761 (2010)

Languages
- Duano' language, Indonesian language, Malay language

Religion
- Sunni Islam

Related ethnic groups
- Orang Laut, Urak Lawoi' people, Moken people, Orang Seletar

The Duano' people, also called Desin Dolak or Desin Duano' are an indigenous people of Malaysia and Indonesia (where they are also referred to as Orang Kuala, meaning "People of the Estuary") and can be found in islands along the northeastern region of Sumatra, Indonesia where most Duano' people have traditionally lived. They are one of the Proto-Malay group of cultures. Due to their nomadic boat lifestyle, based almost exclusively on fishing and collecting shellfish and crustaceans by using mud-boards, Duano' people are often categorized as Orang Laut (lit. Sea People), a group that includes the Urak Lawoi people and Moken people of the northern region of the Malacca Strait and the Andaman Sea. Although there are similarities in their way of life, they are a separate ethnic group. Citing their own language, culture, identity, and economic complexities, they deny being Orang Laut.

Their population is difficult to estimate and their geographical location and concentration is not easily defined. Despite living in a rather developed region and easily coming into contact with outsiders, the Duano' remain little known to the outside world. Their settlements are scattered along the coast of the Strait of Malacca, where individual settlements form local groups that are loosely interconnected.

The Orang Kuala numbered about 2,000 people in 2000. They speak a Para-Malay language called Duano', which is currently endangered.

== Etymology ==
Of all the local subgroups of Duano people, the most studied are found on the west coast of the Malaysian state of Johor, where they receive government services such as healthcare, police, education and infrastructure. In Malaysia, they are called Orang Kuala and are officially recognized as Orang Asli population, the general name for indigenous people in Peninsular Malaysia. In Indonesia, the Duano' people are called Desin Dolak (alternatively Desin Dola', Desin Dolak or Desin Dolaq), and are not included in the official statistics. The name Desin Dola' is only a translation into the Duano' language of the Malay term for Orang Laut, where desin means "people" and dolak means "sea".

Early sources of history and ethnography in the region referred to certain local groups of Duano' as Orang Laut Bugis (J.G. Schot, 1884), Orang Lahut (Tassillo Adam, 1928) and Sendaur (H. Kähler, 1949). This is likely the cause of confusion regarding the correct name of the group.

They refer to themselves as Desin Duano', or simply Duano'. In Malaysia, as noted by Sharifudin Mohamed Yusuf, only the older generation remembers Duano' as the true name of their tribe, since it has been almost completely replaced by the official name, Orang Kuala.

== Settlement area ==
The Duano' people live on both sides of the Straits of Malacca, but the group on the Malaysian side is much smaller.

Within Indonesia, the Duano' people settle the east coast of Sumatra and nearby islands, along a strip of coast between Bengkalis Island and the mouth of the Kampar River in the west, and the delta of the Batang Hari River in the east, including the western part of the Riau Archipelago, within the provinces of Riau, the Riau Islands and Jambi.

Duano' villages in Indonesia are located on Bengkalis Island, Kundur Island, Burung Island, Bangkong Island, Punai Island, Mendulang Island, as well as Tanjung Datu, Pasang Api, Istira, Batang Tuato, Djamih, Perigi Radja, Concong Luar (Kuala Langan), including estuaries located in Batang Hari River, Kateman River, Kampar River, Tungkal River, Retih River and Indragiri River. In Indonesia, most Duano' people live in the Indragiri Hilir Regency in eastern Riau Province.

Generally speaking, when determining the area of resettlement for the Duano' people, it is necessary to take into consideration their lifestyle. They are always on the move, and villages are seen as providing only temporary shelter. The Duano' people could easily leave their village and if necessary, settle in a new place.

In West Peninsular Malaysia, Duano' villages are located on the southwest coast, mainly in estuaries in Batu Pahat District and Pontian District in the state of Johor. They are located in towns like Lenga, Semerah, Minyak Beku, Senggarang, Rengit, Kuala Benut, Pontian Besar and Sungai Layau.

Today, the Duano' people no longer form a single ethnic settlement, instead, there are only isolated villages, often among the settlements of other ethnicities, mainly the ethnic Malays and Chinese.

The east coast of Sumatra is almost entirely covered by mangrove forests and swamps, making it almost inaccessible. Inland areas can only be reached by river transport. Similar natural conditions exist on the west coast of Johor, on the other side of the Strait of Malacca. Until recent development, the mangrove forests and swamps between the Kluang District and Kulai District were inaccessible, except via river mouths as wide as 20 km. These rivers flow into the shallow straits, and the Duano' settlements are found directly adjacent to the river mouths. Just inland are Malay villages, often with the same placenames. In these villages, there are Chinese stores where local fishermen can come to sell their products and buy necessities that are not available locally.

In the last 20 years of the 20th century, roads linking the cities of Johor Bahru and Malacca were laid through the Batu Pahat District. These roads ended the isolation of the coastal region, and now the Duano' villages can be found further inland on Peninsular Malaysia.

== Population ==
In Malaysia government authorities track and provide services to the indigenous peoples of the Peninsular Malaysia, so there are good statistics regarding the population of Orang Asli, and in particular, the Orang Kuala.

According to official data the population of Duano' (Kuala) people in Malaysia has been as follows:

| Year | 1960 | 1965 | 1969 | 1974 | 1980 | 1993 | 2000 | 2003 | 2004 | 2010 |
| Population | 936 | 1,259 | 1,480 | 1,612 | 1,625 | 2,492 | 3,221 | 4,066 | 4,066 | 3,761 |

As for statistics on the Duano' in Indonesia, there are only estimates. For example, according to Ethnologue's data, there are 15,000 (2006, SIL) Duano' people in Indonesia and 19,000 (2006, E. Seidlitz) globally.

Data from the 2017 Joshua Project estimates that there are 18,000 in Indonesia and 4,800 in Malaysia, for a total of 22,800 people.

== Language ==
The Duano' language belongs to the Malayan languages group, along with Indonesian language, Standard Malay language, Minangkabau language and many others. Along with other 35 languages, it is credited with Malay (macrolanguage).

So far the Duano' language has not been thoroughly studied by any linguists. At different times, separate lists of words were identified, which are attributed with the Duano' language. In the early 2000s, Mohd Sharifudin Yusop for the first time in his field research conducted in the territory of the Malaysian state of Johor, composed the list of Duano' words presented in phonetic form. Using these records, the reader will be able to correctly pronounce the Duano' words, even if one has never spoken to the native speakers. The results were published in 2013.

An analysis of existing word lists suggests that the Duano' language is close to the Malay language. The discrepancies between them consist mainly of minor phonetic differences. However, the Duano' language contains a whole group of words denoting action, body parts and various natural objects; for which it is difficult to determine their origin. Because of this, as well as the presence of a number of pronouns, questioning words, prefixes and adverbs, which are quite different from the Malay language, that it is incomprehensible to the Malay people. In general, it can be said that, although the Duano' language is different from Malay language, there are every reason to consider it as one of the Malay dialects, which is slightly different from the Standard Malay language compared to, for instance, the Minangkabau language.

In the Indonesian territory, the Duano' language continues to be actively used. Another is the situation in Malaysia, where it is vigorously supplanted by Standard Malay language, while most of the older generation are still able to converse in their native language. In Malaysia, the Duano' language is threatened with decay.

In addition to their native language, most of the Duano' people are able to speak the Malay language (Bradley 2007a).

Duano' people does not have a proper written language. The level of literacy among the Malaysian Duano' people in the Malay language is about 50%.

Its place in the classification of the Austronesian languages remains unclear to this day.

== History ==
The history of the Duano' people, as well as the history of other stateless people, who lived in harmony with nature and led an appropriate way of life, is virtually unknown. There are no records about them in the historical sources of their neighboring peoples, and the oral tradition of the people is very poor.

The records of J.G. Schot (1884) mentions the historical tradition of the Orang Laut Bugis people, one of the Duano' local groups living in the Indragiri Hilir Regency in the east of the Indonesian province of Riau. They considered themselves descendants of the Bugis people, who, after participating in the wars in Johor against Raja Kecil (Sultan Abdul Jalil Rahmat Shah of Johor) in the early 18th century, found shelter in the river mouth of the Indragiri River. Subsequently, a disaster destroyed their villages and caused many deaths; they vowed to no longer live in huts on the land and since then chose to remain in their boats. In this legend there are two themes, firstly the destruction of the original village, a very common folktale among the sea nomads of the region, and secondly the theme of Bugis domination. Of course, there is no reason to associate the Orang Laut Bugis people with the true Bugis people. Dictionary of the Orang Laut Bugis language, compiled by Shelter, fully corresponds to the Duano' language and therefore, has little in common with the Bugis language of the island of Sulawesi. On the other hand, the Bugis people in the 18th century had actively pursued commercial activities in the Riau Archipelago. They might well have close business relationships with certain groups of the Duano' people. The Bugis people during this period also occupied leading positions in a number of Malay sultanates, including in Johor. It is not surprising, then, that the Duano' people, to whom their Malay neighbors were contemptuous, sought an alliance, whether true or apparently, with representatives of this prestigious group of people. Unlike the Malay people, the Bugis people have always been kind to the indigenous population, as they were interested in the local's services as experts of the coast of the region.

In the 19th century, the Duano' people began to accept Islam. After which they had already appeared on the territory of modern Malaysia. Malaysian Orang Kuala people are believed to be descended from the Bengkalis Island.

== Religion ==
In regards to religion, the Duano' people are Muslims. They were converted to Islam in the 19th century.

In Malaysia, where the question of religion is related to the official status of the people, the Duano' people insist that they are not pagans, as they do not eat pork or dugongs, do not have dogs on their boats and therefore cannot be considered in the same category as with other indigenous Orang Asli people of the peninsular part of the country. They are also advocates of Islam, according to official statistics held in Malaysia. Thus, according to JHEOA 1997, in Johor, all 2,918 Orang Kuala were Muslims.

Despite the fact that the Duano' people have long been advocates of Islam, they are not diligent in daily prayers, nor do they visit mosques regularly, and do not usually attend to Friday prayers. It happens that during the execution of Muslim rituals, the Duano' people are always carefree, and in turn, offending the feelings of other believers.

Another norm not seen in the Duano' people is also the typical of Muslims social segregation by gender.

In their everyday practice, the Duano' people often turn to their pre-Islamic traditional animistic beliefs. They believe that the world around them is filled with the spirits of nature (Malay language, hantu). Causing dissatisfaction with the spirits, according to their beliefs, can result in one's illness, conflict, and death. A fisherman who dares to throw a fishing net in the rainy season without having fulfilled a pre-established ritual will inevitably suffer from it. The Duano' people have their own spiritual healers, who, in their opinion, have supernatural abilities. The only way to treat is to cast spell on the spirits.

At the same time, the Duano' people do not speak about their traditional religion, emphasizing their beliefs in Islam in every possible way.

== Culture ==
The Duano' people have developed a highly specialized complex economic, based on rich, but very limited variety of composition, local natural resources. Their villages are on the very edge of the land, usually in the river mouths and quite close to the seaside coast. During the sea tides, the water level rises high. The Duano' people place their huts on a narrow marshy land strip that appears along the mangrove thickets only during the outflow. Duano' buildings are made of wooden platforms, mounted on stilts, and resemble like bridges. On this platform, there is a living room, as well as a spacious area for drying nets and drying fish. All the designs are casually built from wooden boards. For example, the Duano' village of Kuala Benut in Malaysia, located at the mouth of the same name Benut River, where in 1967 there were about 60 of such huts.

During flood the water reaches up to the floor of their houses. During a flood the wooden stairs allow one to descend from the platform to the ground where the boats are.

Almost every Duano' family has a boat. There are two main types of boats that they buy or build. The jelo 'penat is a dugout-boat with a keel. Another type is a bigger boat called kota'. They have a dry palm leaf atap (roofing) and are able to seat a family on board. In Malay language, this type of boat is called sampan kotak.

The main occupation of the Duano' people is fishing. Fishes are caught in the river mouths, trapping them with a net, or in the open sea with grids, fishing line or traps. Additionally, mollusks and other marine life that are found in the mud by the coast are harvested. For this purpose, they use a special board called papantungka. There is no division of labor by gender in the Duano' society. Only young mothers caring for small children are exempted from fishing.

Although the Duano' people are often counted as part of the Orang laut, they are not sea nomads. Though they can live for a long time in their boats and go to sea for fishing, they would still return to their village by the coast. When, for example, in May, the southern winds interfere with navigation in the Strait of Malacca, the Duano' people often go to the eastern coast of the Malaysian Peninsula. Thus, we can say that their practices are seasonally based. At the same time, their migrations pattern have always taken place and occur in a limited area, where for centuries their places have remained practically in the same region.

Their villages are not permanent, people can easily change the location of the village, usually due to the variability of the coastline.

The Duano' people are well known in the local waters, as it is also known to all Orang laut tribes living in the region.

Fish and seafood are used for both own consumption and for sale.

One of the unique traditions of the Duano' people is to gather and harvest sumbun (Solen grandis) once a year. Sumbun is a type of a local razor clam that is a favorite delicacy of the Duano' community in Jambi, Indonesia. This habit of catching the sumbun is common among the Duano' people and many of those that inhabit the east coast of Jambi, Indonesia, especially in East Tanjung Jabung Regency and West Tanjung Jabung Regency. Sumbun is generally known to be found in China, West Kalimantan, and in the waters of Jambi, as well as parts of Riau Islands, Indonesia. In fact, these sumbuns that are found in muddy waters made East Tanjung Jabung Regency as one of three special regions of sumbun producers in Indonesia. Harvesting of the sumbun is a unique tradition of the locals with the potential for further development. The harvesting and gathering of sumbun can be introduced through this tradition, especially in Jambi due to the uniqueness of the region's water biota. The special dish of the local Duano' community is the sumbun soup, which is known of its soft and uniquely distinct meat.

The traditional way of managing their welfare does not allow these people to provide themselves with everything that they need. Clothing, foods and vegetables are bought from the neighboring Chinese or Malay population. They themselves offer fish and seafood. For this purpose, the Duano' people are regularly to go to the shops in the city, where they would carry out trading operations and store fresh water.

It is generally known that the Duano' people are simple and peaceful. They are not particularly attracted to modern technology and only a small percentage graduate high school. At the same time, contacts with the outside world are important. In Malaysia, the Duanp' people, like all of the other Orang Asli tribes, are supported by the Department of Orang Asli Development (JAKOA). Employees of the department regularly visit the Duano' community to implement various social, economic and educational programs. People are increasingly integrating into mainstream culture. They borrowed many aspects of Malay culture and lifestyle.

The traditional life of the Duano' people in Malaysia has now undergone significant changes. Their settlements have also appeared in inland areas, where their livelihood is not connected with the sea. There are some existing small Duano' farms and plantations. While some of them are hired in the industry and agriculture. The development of infrastructure in the region has made it easier for them to travel to work in large cities. Some of the Duano' people have achieved some success in business or working in the service sector. At least one Duano' village specializes in the restoration and sale of used furniture. But the leading branch of the economy remains, as before, the fishery, although here the increasing numbers of Duano' people have begun to use modern methods and technical means.

Mustafa Omar and Nor Hafizah Mohd Fizer, in 2015, published the results of a survey conducted in 2012 between the two communities of Orang Asli: the Orang Kuala and Orang Kanaq in the Kota Tinggi District, Johor, Malaysia. Those that were interviewed included 51 heads of households in the village of Sungai Layau. As it turned out, the Duano' people markedly dominated the Orang Kanaq on all indicators of living standards. None of them had a lower income than RM500 per month, that is, not being below the poverty line; 35.3% had earnings at RM500-999 per month, 37.3% at RM1,000-1,499, and 27.5% over RM1,500 per month. Significantly the Duano' people are more effective than the Orang Kanaq in using state aid, which is allocated for education and development of entrepreneurial activity.

== Relationship with other ethnicities ==
The Duano' people clearly position themselves as a separate people group. They believe that they have nothing to do with other non-Malaysian populations living in the Malacca Strait.

Indicative is the attitude of the Duano' people to the ethnic names imposed on them from the outside. Oranq Kuala in Malaysia do not perceive the term "Orang Asli", they consider it only as an official euphemism, which should replace the obscene name of "Sakai", which in the past was applied to the "wild" tribes of the inland areas of the Malay Peninsula. These people are pagans, do not adhere to Muslim rules, and the Duano' people who practice the Islamic faith can not be united with them. Orang Kuala wants to officially recognize the name "Orang Melayu Kuala" (Kuala Malay people or Kuala Malays), that is, "estuary Malay people" or "Malay people of the estuary", as this would be more in line with their social status.

They also reject the name "Orang laut" because of its disdainful shade. So the inhabitants of the land scornfully call the sea nomads, "dirty" people living in boats, do not adhere to Muslim traditions, involved with witchcraft and find themselves with unclean power. The Duano' people do not consider themselves to be as such.

Their relationship with their Malay neighbors, which they call Desin Damangami or Desin Damong, is ambiguous. These two peoples are very close in terms of language and culture, but they are clearly aware of the differences between them. The Duano' people have taken over many features of the Malay culture and lifestyle, but racial differences do not allow them to fully integrate into Malay society. At the forefront in the relations between peoples are political factors, given the dominant position of the Malay people in society. The Malay people, in general, are disdainful to the Duano' people and others like them, because they are of different origin. At the domestic level, they constantly reproached the Duano' people for their carefree attitude towards Islamic rituals and traditions. On the other hand, Duano' people that are not accepted in the Malay society, feel a clear image and do not want to recognize this state of affairs and do not consider themselves below the Malay people.

Given the nature of the relationship between the Malay people and the Duano' people, marriages between them are often not welcomed on both sides. Separate mixed marriages occur in the Duano' mostly with Bugis (originating from Sulawesi) and Banjar people (coming from the southeast Kalimantan). Another is the situation in Indonesia, at the mouth of the Indragiri River. Here the Duano' people often welcome marriages with local Malay people and in fact constitute a mixed group of people.

They practically do not contact other Duano' community and other people group from the sea nomads people that have resettled in the Strait of Malacca. Such a closed way of life only accentuate the isolation of the people.

== Notes ==
=== Bibliography ===
- Diandara Oryza; Samsuddin Samsuddin; Irmawati Sagala; Aris Dwi Nugroho; Jamaluddin Jamaluddin; Abdul Malik; Syamsul Bahri (2018), "Duano's Local Wisdom in Preserving Marine Ecosystem at Jambi Coastal Area", IOP Conference Series: Earth and Environmental Science, 175 (1) 012227, IOP Publishing, Bibcode:2018E&ES..175a2227O, doi:10.1088/1755-1315/175/1/012227, S2CID 134293339
