= Moken =

Ethnic group of the Mergui Archipelago and Surin Islands

Moken people Mawken/Morgan ဆလုံလူမျိုး/ชาวเล
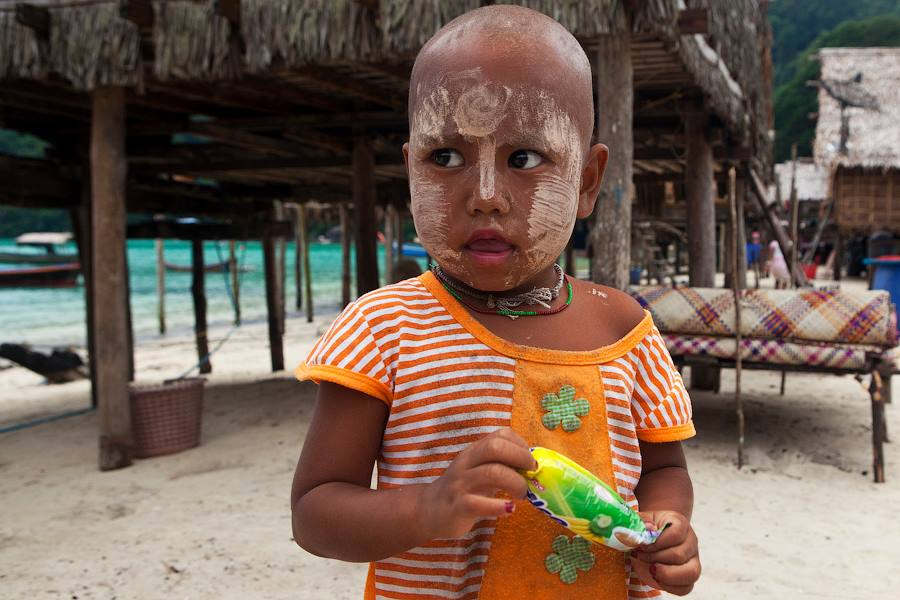
- Moken girl wearing thanaka on her face

Regions with significant populations
- Thailand; Myanmar

Languages
- Moken, Malay, Thai, Burmese, others

Religion
- Ancestor worship, Buddhism

Related ethnic groups
- Malay, Orang Laut, Bajau

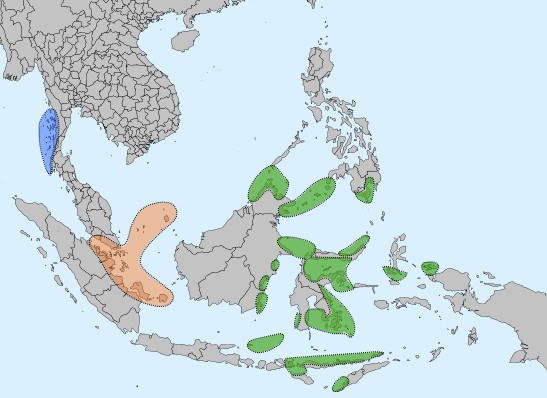
Regions inhabited by peoples usually known as "Sea Nomads". Moken Orang Laut Sama-Bajau

The Moken (also Mawken or Morgan; Burmese: ဆလုံ လူမျိုး; Thai: ชาวเล, romanized: chao le, lit. 'sea people') are an Austronesian people of the Mergui Archipelago, a group of approximately 800 islands claimed by both Myanmar and Thailand, and the Surin Islands. Most of the Moken live a semi-nomadic hunter-gatherer lifestyle heavily based on the sea, though this lifestyle is increasingly under threat.

The Moken identify in a common culture and some speak the Moken language, a distinct Austronesian language. Attempts by both Myanmar and Thailand to assimilate the Moken into the wider regional culture have met with very limited success. However, the Moken face an uncertain future as their population decreases and their nomadic lifestyle and unsettled legal status leave them marginalized by modern property and immigration laws, maritime conservation and development programs, and tightening border policies.

== Nomenclature ==
The people refer to themselves as Moken. The name is used for all of the Austronesian speaking tribes who inhabit the coast and islands in the Andaman Sea on the west coast of Thailand, the provinces of Satun, Trang, Krabi, Phuket, Phang Nga, and Ranong, up through the Mergui Archipelago of Myanmar. The group includes the Moken proper, the Moklen (Moklem), the Orang Sireh (Betel-leaf People), and the Orang Lanta. The last, the Orang Lanta, are a hybridized group formed when the Malay people settled the Lanta Islands where the proto-Malay Orang Sireh had been living. The Moken are considered to be mostly sedentary with more permanent villages in the provinces of Phang-nga, Phuket, Krabi, and Satun. These individuals also have closer ties to the countries in which they reside as they accept both the nationality and citizenship. Their children are also educated through local schools and are exposed to more mainstream cultural ideas. The Moken residing on the Surin Islands retain their more traditional methods and lifestyle.

The Burmese call the Moken Salone. In Thailand they are called chao le, which can mean people who "live by the sea and pursue a marine livelihood" or those who speak the Austronesian language. Another term that can be used is chao nam ("people of the water"), although these terms are also used loosely to include the Urak Lawoi and even the Orang Laut. In Thailand, acculturated Moken are called Thai mai ("new Thais").

Because of their nomadic lifestyle, the Moken are also called "sea gypsies" (unrelated to the Romani people), a generic term that applies to a number of peoples in Southeast Asia (see Sea Gypsies (disambiguation)). The Urak Lawoi are sometimes classified with the Moken, but they are linguistically and ethnologically distinct, being much more closely related to the Malay people.

== Way of life ==
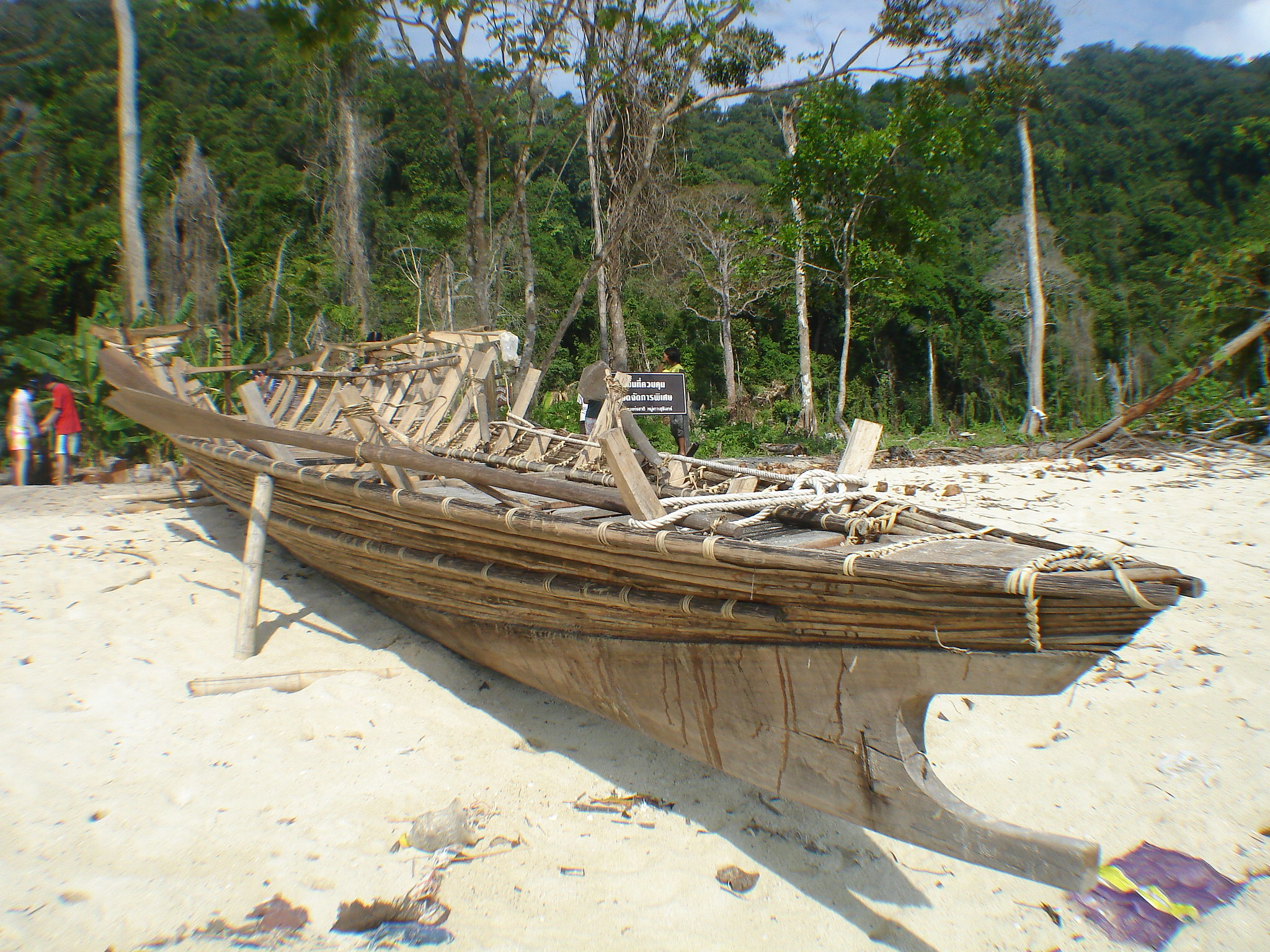
A Moken boat. Note the bifurcated bow missing in traditional Thai fishing boats.

Their knowledge of the sea enables them to live off its fauna and flora by using simple tools such as nets and spears to forage for food, which allows them to impact the environment less than other more intensive forms of subsistence. Furthermore, their frequent movement in kin groups of between two and ten families also allows the land to rest and prevents overuse. Moken are considered hunter-gatherers due to their nomadic lifestyle and lack of material good accumulation. They also believe strongly in the idea that natural resources cannot be owned individually but are rather something that the entire community has access to without restrictions. Their egalitarian society follows into their ancestral worship as they regularly present supernatural beings with food offerings.

More recently, they have reached out and begun trading some food (sea cucumbers and edible bird's nests) as well as marine products like pearls for other necessities at local markets. Trading and epidemics (cholera and smallpox) also lead to their nomadic lifestyles in order to collect a variety of products to trade and to avoid the spread of deadly diseases. If an epidemic begins to spread, the infected members will remain at the location with a small amount of provisions, while healthy members will depart to a new location. The hope is that the provisions will allow the sick enough time to recuperate while not endangering the rest of the kin group with their sickness. The nomadic lifestyle can also reduce group conflict as affected parties may leave one kin group and enter another to give some distance and allow the feud to die down. After some time has passed and the arguing parties see each other once more, the intensity of the argument will have decreased leading to more amicable relationships. The Moken use 83 plant species for food, 33 for medicinal purposes, 53 for construction of huts, boats and tools, and 54 species for other purposes.

During the dry north-east monsoon season (when the sea is relatively calm), the Moken used to live on their boats called kabang, which served not just as transportation, but also as a kitchen, bedroom, and living area. The last kabang of the Surin Islands was built in 2006 and an initiative to revive the tradition started in 2018. Previously the Moken used a kabang koman, "a dug-out boat equipped with a salacca gunwale [where] Salacca is a light wood with a long stem". To construct the boat, the different pieces are fitted into each other with the natural resources the Moken can find on land. The boat's usage was discontinued more than 40 years ago as the salt water eroded the wood within three to sixth months, therefore new techniques were devised to create more robust boats. The kabang lasts longer and one anthropologist, Jacques Ivanoff, suggests that the boat with its bifurcated bow and stern represent the human body. In monsoon season, which falls between the months of May and October, they set temporary camps on the mainland. During the monsoon season, they build additional boats and forage for food in the forest.

Some of the Burmese Moken are still nomadic people who roam the sea most of their lives; however, much of their traditional life, which is built on the premise of life as outsiders, is under threat.

== History ==
There is much speculation as to the historical origins of the Moken people. It is thought that, due to their Austronesian language, they originated in Southern China as agriculturalists 5000–6000 years ago. From there, the Austronesian peoples dispersed and settled various South Asian Islands. It is theorized that the Moken were forced off of these coastal islands into a nomadic lifestyle on the water due to rising sea levels. For centuries the Tenasserim coast, centered on the port of Myeik, was part of the Kingdom of Siam until 1765 when much of it was conquered by the Third Burmese Empire. In 1826 the region was conquered by the British Empire who ruled it until Burmese independence.

=== Recent history ===
The Andaman Sea off the Tenasserim coast was the subject of keen scrutiny from Myanmar's regime during the 1990s due to offshore petroleum discoveries by multinational corporations including Unocal, Petronas and others. Reports from the late-1990s told of forced relocation by Myanmar's military regime of the sea nomads to mainland sites. It was claimed most of the Moken peoples had been relocated by 1997, which is consistent with a pervasive pattern of forced relocation of suspect ethnic, economic and political groups, conducted throughout Myanmar during the 1990s.

The islands the Moken inhabit received much attention during the recovery from the 2004 tsunami. As they are keenly attuned to the ocean, the Moken in the Surin Islands knew the tsunami that struck on 26 December 2004 was coming and managed to preserve many lives. However, in the coastal villages of Phang Nga Province, like Tap Tawan, the Moken suffered severe devastation to housing and fishing boats in common with other Moken communities.

In Thailand, the Moken have been the target of land grabs by developers contesting their ownership of ancestral lands. Although nomadic peoples have resided in Thailand's Andaman coastal provinces for several centuries, they have historically neglected to register official ownership of the land due to their lack of knowledge and involvement in legal protocol. The Burmese and Thai governments have made attempts at assimilating the people into their own culture, but these efforts have met with limited success. Thai Moken have been permanently settled in villages located in the Surin Islands (Mu Ko Surin National Park), in Phuket Province, on the northwestern coast of Phuket Island, and on the nearby Phi Phi Islands of Krabi Province.

In Myanmar the largest industries in the region are fishing and mining much of which is government led despite the lands being designated a national park. The Moken have limited to know official documentation of their land rights which makes it easy for the government to seize lands for fishing and mining leaving the Moken "less [independence] every day with new regions being posted as off-limits." Mining pollutes and damages the coral reefs the Moken depend on for survival. The pearl diving trade has declined drastically but has been some replaced by business harvesting implanted pearls. However some Moken continue to dive for pearls and have even been offered contracts by fishing companies. Due to diving some people have been disabled and unable to fish making continued the practice reluctant.

Under the democratic government of Aung Sang Su Kyi things briefly improved for the Moken. Two thirds of the stateless Moken fishers were given identity papers. A scholarship fund was set up to allowing Moken children to go to high school in Myeik. Outside businesses came in to teach the Moken in various industries such as healthcare and tourism. Since the violent military takeover in 2021 all of this has dried up. After the coup, 300 Moken fled to Thailand hoping to avoid the war. The Moken have mostly not been mass conscripted by the Tatmandaw as of February 2026. However Moken currently face the same acute economic harship as the rest of the country and arbitrary detainment by police.

== Underwater sight ==
For most of the human population, unaided vision underwater is very poor because the eye's cornea fails to focus light onto the retina. In the air, the cornea accomplishes two thirds of the focussing of light; this is missing when underwater, yielding blur. Moken children, however, are able to see underwater while freediving to collect clams, sea cucumbers, and more. Anna Gislén and colleagues showed that the children see better underwater than European children: their "spatial resolution ... [is] more than twice as good".

The researchers showed that the Moken children have the ability to constrict their pupils when underwater and the ability to increase the power of their eyes' lenses to the maximum when underwater. Decreasing the size of the pupil improves the eye's depth of field, reducing blur; increasing the power of the eyes' lenses also reduces blur.

The researchers ruled out other possible explanations for the Moken children's underwater abilities: They had not, at some state of their evolutionary history, traded off focusing power from the corneas to their eyes' lenses. Their eyes are not shortsighted. Their ability to alter the power of their lenses is not superior. Later, Gislén and others trained European children to see better underwater, for example by crossing their eyes, which increases the power of their lenses and reduces the diameter of their pupils. They found that the European children could then see as well underwater as the Moken children.

== See also ==
- Moklenic languages
- Sama-Bajau
- Sea Nomads, a disambiguation page
- Urak Lawoi
