= Orang Laut =

Ethnic group of Southeast Asia

Orang Laut اورڠ لاءوت
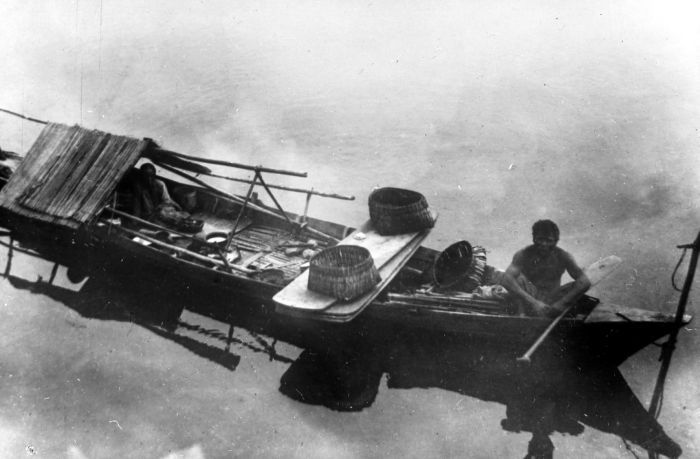
- An Orang Laut family living in a boat, circa 1914–1921.

Total population
- 420,000

Regions with significant populations
- Malay Peninsula: Malaysia Riau Archipelago: Indonesia Singapore

Languages
- Loncong, Orang Seletar, Malay (Malaysian, Singaporean, Indonesian)

Religion
- Animism, Folk religion, Islam

Related ethnic groups
- Orang Kuala, Orang Darat, Orang Seletar, Sama-Bajau, Moken, Urak Lawoi’ people, Malay people

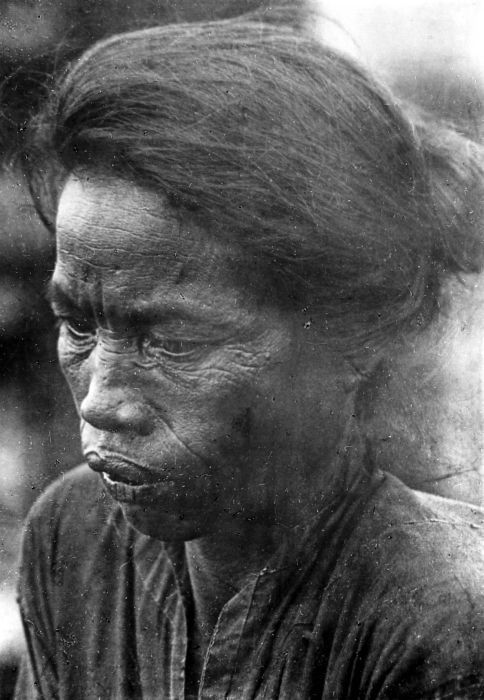
An Orang Laut woman in Solok, Jambi southern Sumatra

The Orang Laut (also known as the Orang Suku Laut) are several seafaring ethnic groups and tribes living around Singapore, Peninsular Malaysia and the Indonesian Riau Islands. The Orang Laut are commonly identified as the Orang Seletar (also known as Orang Selat) from the Straits of Johor. The term may also refer to any Malayic-speaking people living on coastal islands, including those of the Mergui Archipelago in Myanmar and Thailand, commonly known as Moken, sometimes even extended to Sama-Bajau.

The population of the tribe in the 21st century is estimated to be 420,000 people.

== Etymology ==
The Malay term orang laut literally means 'sea peoples'. The Orang Laut live and travel in their boats on the sea. They made their living from fishing, foraging and trading sea products. Another Malay term for them, Orang Selat (literally 'Straits people'), was brought into European languages as Celates or Selates.

== Distribution ==
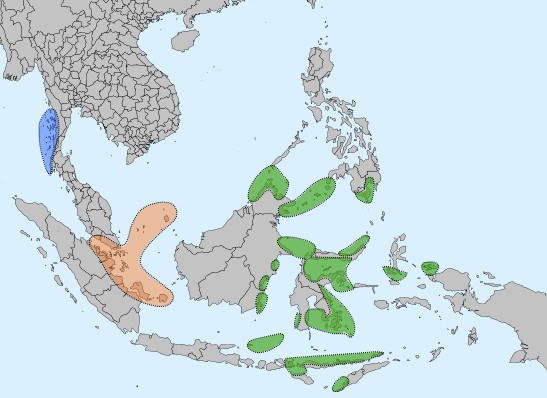
Regions inhabited by peoples usually known as "Sea Nomads". Orang Laut Moken Sama-Bajau

Broadly speaking, the term encompasses the numerous suku tribes and groups forming a maritime territory or Alam Melayu inhabiting the islands and estuaries in the Ria Archipelago, the Pulau Tujuh Islands, the Batam Archipelago, and the coasts and offshore islands of eastern Sumatra, the southern Malay Peninsula and Singapore.

== History ==
The earliest description of the Orang Laut may have been by the 14th century Chinese traveler Wang Dayuan who described the inhabitants of Temasek (present day Singapore) in his work Daoyi Zhilüe.

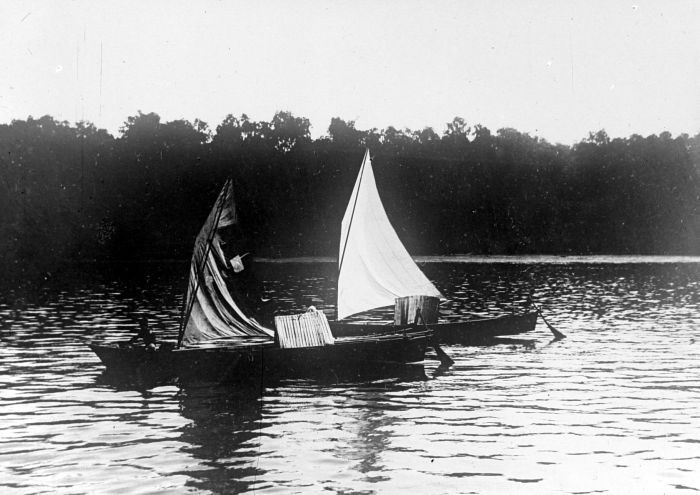
House barges of the Orang Laut off the coast of Jambi and Riau, Dutch East Indies, circa 1914–1921.

Historically, the Orang Laut played major roles in Srivijaya, the Sultanate of Malacca, and the Sultanate of Johor. They patrolled the adjacent sea areas, repelling pirates, directing traders to their employers' ports and maintaining those ports' dominance in the area. In return, the ruler gave the Orang Laut leaders prestigious titles and gifts.

The role of the Orang Laut declined with the disintegration of the Johor-Malacca Sultanate and its dynasty, being replaced by Bugis. They moved south, with the Orang Gelam at the Singapore River continuing to serve the Temenggong, and formed Singapore's main population until the arrival of the British in 1819.

From that point on, Orang Laut communities such as Orang Gelam, Orang Seletar or Orang Kallang settled in semi-nomadic fashion along rivers, coastlines and smaller islands such as Telok Saga or Selat Sinkheh on Pulau Brani. In Singapore, Orang Laut communities resided on Southern islands until the 1970s. Today, in Indonesia's Riau Islands, specifically Bintan, vulnerable Orang Suku Laut communities are one of the few left nomadic.

== Popular culture ==
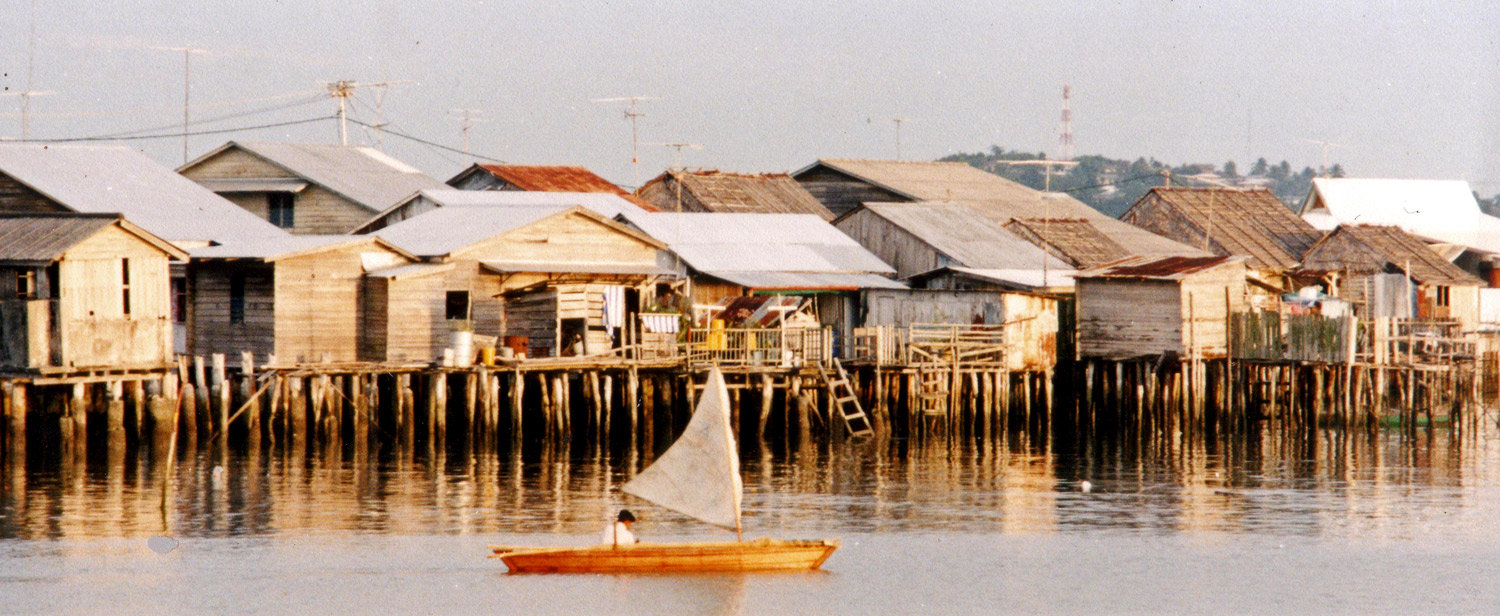
Villages of Orang Laut in Riau Islands.

In the story The Disturber of Traffic by Rudyard Kipling, a character called Fenwick misrenders the Orang Laut as "Orange-Lord", before being corrected by the narrator character, who states they are the "Orang-Laut".

== See also ==
- Piracy in the Strait of Malacca
- Orang Laut in Singapore
- Urak Lawoi’ people
- Sampan panjang, Orang Laut racing boat
- Loncong language
