= Jah Hut =

Jah Hut may refer to:

- Jah Hut language
- Jah Hut people
