= Orang Asli =

Indigenous peoples of Peninsular Malaysia

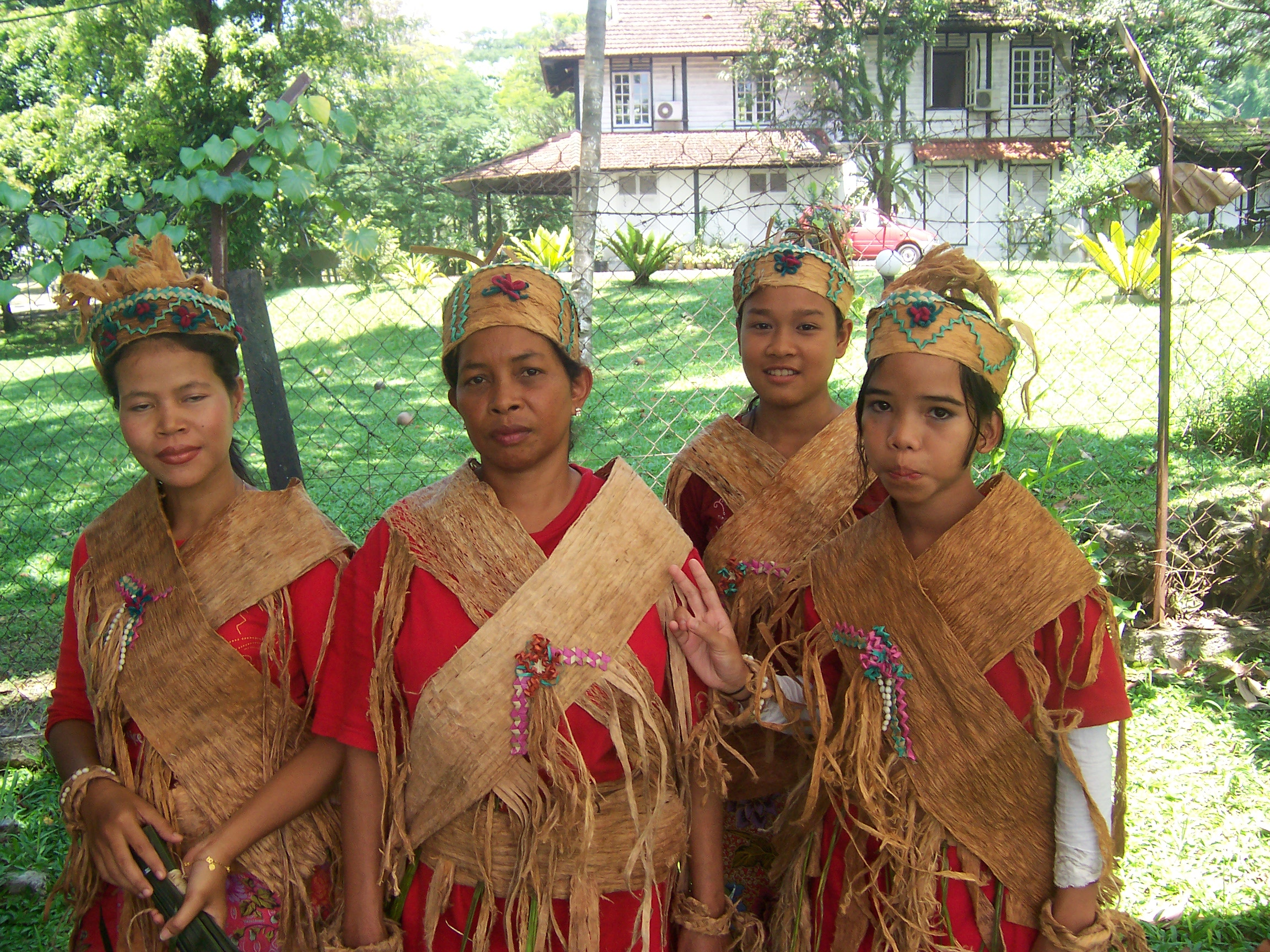
- A group of Orang Asli from Malacca in folk costume

Total population
- 221,098 (2024)

Regions with significant populations
- Malaysia

Languages
- Aslian languages (Austroasiatic); Aboriginal Malay languages (Austronesian); Malaysian, Bahasa Rojak, Manglish, English

Religion
- Animism, Christianity, Islam, Hinduism, Buddhism

Related ethnic groups
- Peninsula Malays; Maniq of southern Thailand; Akit, Orang Rimba, Batin, Bonai, Petalangan, Talang Mamak, and Sekak Bangka of Sumatera, Indonesia

The Orang Asli (Note: Malay for 'native people', 'original people', or 'aboriginal people'; there is no such equivalent in the indigenous languages. Instead, the names for individual ethnic groups are used.) are a heterogeneous indigenous population forming a national minority in Malaysia. They are the oldest inhabitants of Peninsular Malaysia.

As of 2017, the Orang Asli accounted for 0.7% of the population of Peninsular Malaysia. Although seldom mentioned in the country's demographics, the Orang Asli are a distinct group, alongside the Malays, Chinese, Indians, and the indigenous East Malaysians of Sabah and Sarawak. Their special status is enshrined in law. Orang Asli settlements are scattered among the mostly Malay population of the country, often in mountainous areas or the jungles of the rainforest.

While outsiders often perceive them as a single group, there are many distinctive groups and tribes, each with its own language, culture and customary land. Each group considers itself independent and different from the other communities. What mainly unites the Orang Asli is their distinctiveness from the three major ethnic groups of Peninsular Malaysia (ethnic Malays, Chinese, and Indian) and their historical sidelining in social, economic, and cultural matters. Like other indigenous peoples, Orang Asli strive to preserve their own distinctive culture and identity, which is linked by physical, economic, social, cultural, territorial, and spiritual ties to their immediate natural environment.

== Terminology ==
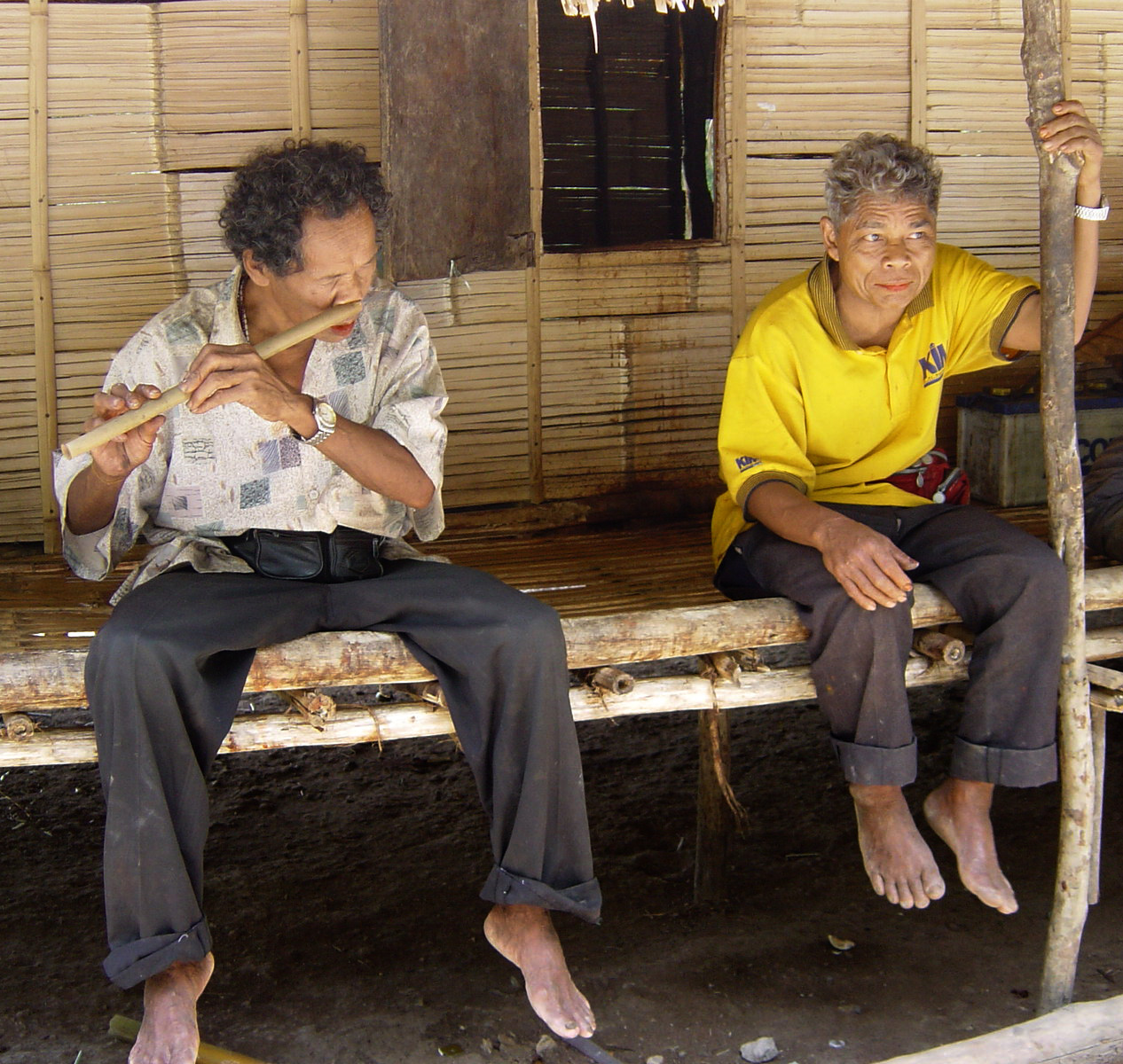
Orang Asli near Cameron Highlands playing a nose flute

Prior to the official use of the term "Orang Asli" beginning in the early 1960s, the common terms for the indigenous population of Peninsular Malaysia varied. Thomas John Newbold recorded that "Malays" of Rembau in present-day Negeri Sembilan had given their local forest-dwelling hunter-gathering population the contemporary name of orang benua (Jawi: اورڠ بنوا) meaning "people of the soil or country". Towards the end of British colonial rule on the Malay Peninsula, there were attempts to classify these disparate groups. Residents of the southern regions often called them Jakun, and those in the northern regions called them Sakai. Later on, all indigenous groups became known as Sakai, meaning Aborigines. The term "aborigines", as an official name, appeared in the English version of the Constitution of British Malaya and the laws of the country. Past colonial rule by European and Islamic powers gave both the Malay word Sakai and the English term Aborigines pejorative connotations, hinting at the supposed backwardness and primitivism of these people. During the Malayan Emergency in the 1950s Communist rebels, seeking the support of the indigenous tribes, began referring to them as Orang Asal, meaning "native people": the adjective asal itself from Arabic: أصل, romanized: 'asl "origin". The Communists won their support, and the government, seeking to do the same, began adopting the same terminology. Thus, the new, slightly modified term "Orang Asli", carrying the same sense of "original people", was born. The term was officially used in English, where it is identical in both the singular and the plural. Despite its origin as an exonym, the term was adopted by indigenous peoples themselves.

== Ethnogenesis ==
The Orang Asli make up one of 95 subgroups of indigenous people of Malaysia, the Orang Asal, each with their own distinct language and culture. The British colonial government classified the indigenous population of the Malay Peninsula on physiological and cultural-economic grounds upon which the Aboriginal Department (responsible for dealing with Orang Asli issues since the British Malaya government) developed their own classification of indigenous tribes based on their physical characteristics, linguistic kinship, cultural practices and geographical settlement. This divides Orang Asli into three main categories, with six ethnic subgroups each (totaling 18 ethnic subgroups).

- Negrito (or Semang), generally located in the northern portion of the peninsula, were short dark-skinned nomadic hunter-gatherers with Asiatic facial features and tightly curly hair.
- Senoi (or Sakai), residing in the central region, were wavy-haired people taller than the Negrito, engaged in slash-and-burn agriculture, and periodically changed their place of residence.
- Proto-Malay (or Aboriginal Malay), living in the southern region, were settled farmers, lighter-skinned, of normal height, with straight hair.

This division does not claim to be scientific and has many shortcomings. The boundaries between the groups are not fixed, and merge into each other, and the Orang Asli themselves use names associated with their specific area or by a local term meaning 'human being'.

Semang are part of the earliest modern human migration that arrived Peninsular Malaysia 50 to 60 thousand years ago, while Senoi are part of Austroasiatic population that arrived Peninsular Malaysia 10 to 30 thousand years ago. Some earlier hypotheses pointed out the Semang and Senoi as descendants of the Hoabinhian people, Further research showed Semang shared genetic drift with ancient genomes from Hoabinhian ancestry, suggesting that they are genetically closer to the ancestors of Hoabinhian hunter-gatherers who occupied northern parts of Peninsular Malaysia during the late Pleistocene. Both groups speak Austroasiatic languages (also known as Mon-Khmer language).

The Proto-Malays, who speak Austronesian languages, migrated to the area between 2000 and 1500 BCE during the Austronesian expansion. Along with the ethnic Malays, they originated from the seaborne migration of the Austronesian peoples, ultimately from Taiwan. It is believed that Proto-Malays were the first wave of Proto-Malayo-Polynesian speakers that settled Borneo and the western Sunda Islands initially, but didn't penetrate Peninsula Malaysia due to preexisting populations of Austroasiatic speakers. Later Austronesian migrations from either western Borneo or Sumatra, settled the coastal areas of Peninsular Malaysia became the modern Malayic-speaking populations ("Deutero-Malays"). However, other authors have also concluded that there is no real distinction between Proto-Malays and Deutero-Malays, and both are descendants of a single migration event into Sumatra, Peninsular Malaysia and southern Vietnam from western Borneo, This migration diverged into the modern speakers of the Malayic and Chamic branches of the Austronesian language family.

The Proto-Malays were originally considered ethnic Malay, but reclassified arbitrarily as part of Orang Asli by the British colonial authorities due to the similarity of their socio-economic and lifestyles with the Senoi and Semang. There are various degrees of admixture within all three groups. Only over time did indigenous peoples begin to identify themselves under the common name "Orang Asli" as a marker of collective identity as natives, distinct from the predominant ethnic groups more recently arrived to the peninsula. Orang Asli seldom associate themselves with the categories of "Negrito", "Senoi" and "Aboriginal Malays".

The Orang Asli Negrito share a common genetic origin with East Asian people, but each can be differentiated on a finer scale.

=== Semang ===
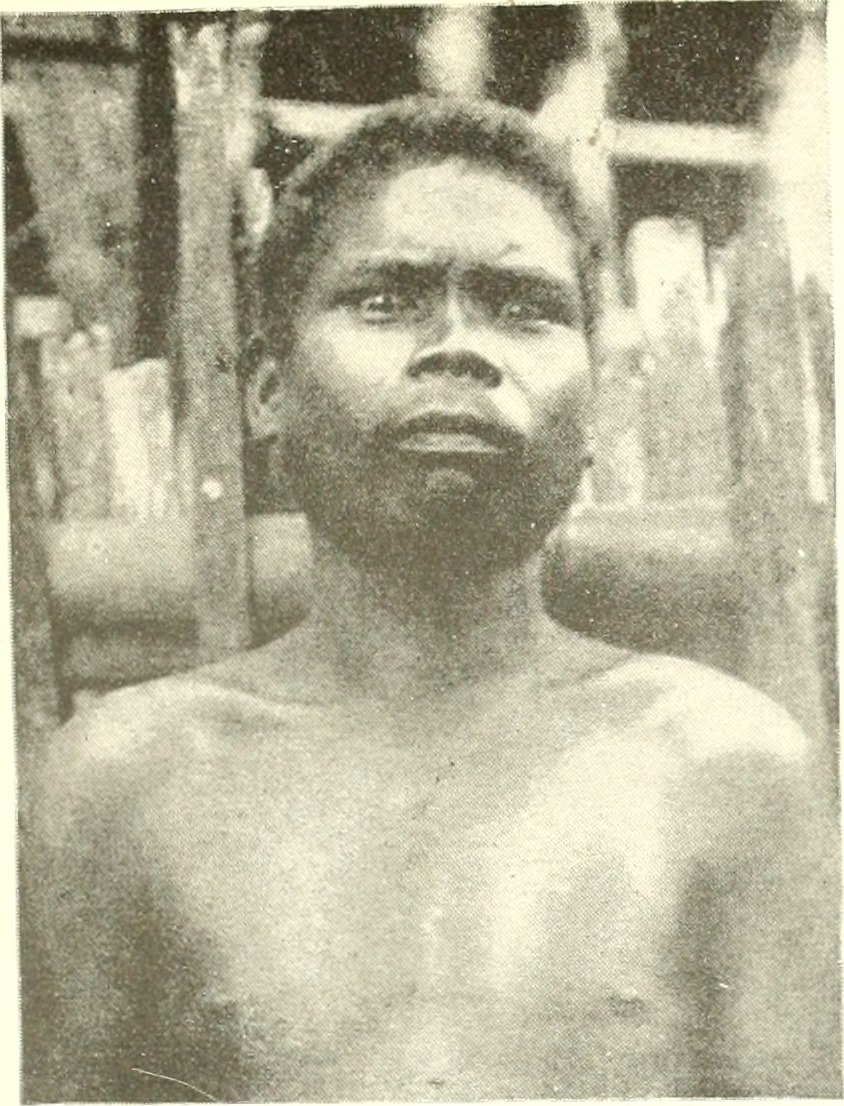
A Semang man from Kuala Aring, Ulu Kelantan, 1902

According to the Encyclopedia of Malaysia, the Semang or Pangan are regarded as the earliest inhabitants of the Malay Peninsula. They live mainly in the northern regions of the country, and are mostly descended from the people of the Hoabinhian cultural period, with many of their burials found dating back 10,000 years ago.

They speak the Aslian languages branch of the Mon-Khmer languages, which are part of the Austroasiatic language family, as do their Senoi agriculturalist neighbours. Most of them belong to the North Aslian language group, and only the Lanoh language belongs to the Central Aslian languages group.

Negrito tribes:

| Tribal name | Traditional occupation (pre-1950s) | Settlement areas | Branch of Aslian languages |
|---|---|---|---|
| Kensiu people | hunter-gatherer, trade | Kedah | North Aslian language |
| Kintaq people | hunter-gatherer, trade | Perak | North Aslian language |
| Lanoh people | harvesting, hunting, trade, slash-and-burn agriculture | Perak | Central Aslian languages |
| Jahai people | hunter-gatherer, trade | Perak, Kelantan | North Aslian language |
| Mendriq people | slash-and-burn agriculture, hunter-gatherer | Kelantan | North Aslian language |
| Batek people | hunter-gatherer, trade | Kelantan, Pahang | North Aslian language |
| Mintil people | hunter-gatherer, trade | Pahang | North Aslian language |
| Semang Bakau | hunter-gatherer, trade | Formerly Penang, Kedah [now extinct] | North Aslian |

As of 2010, the Semang number approximately 4,800. They mostly live in Perak (2,413 people, 48.2%), Kelantan (1,381 people, 27.6%) and Pahang (925 people, 18.5%). The remaining 5.7% of Semang are distributed throughout Malaysia.

=== Senoi ===
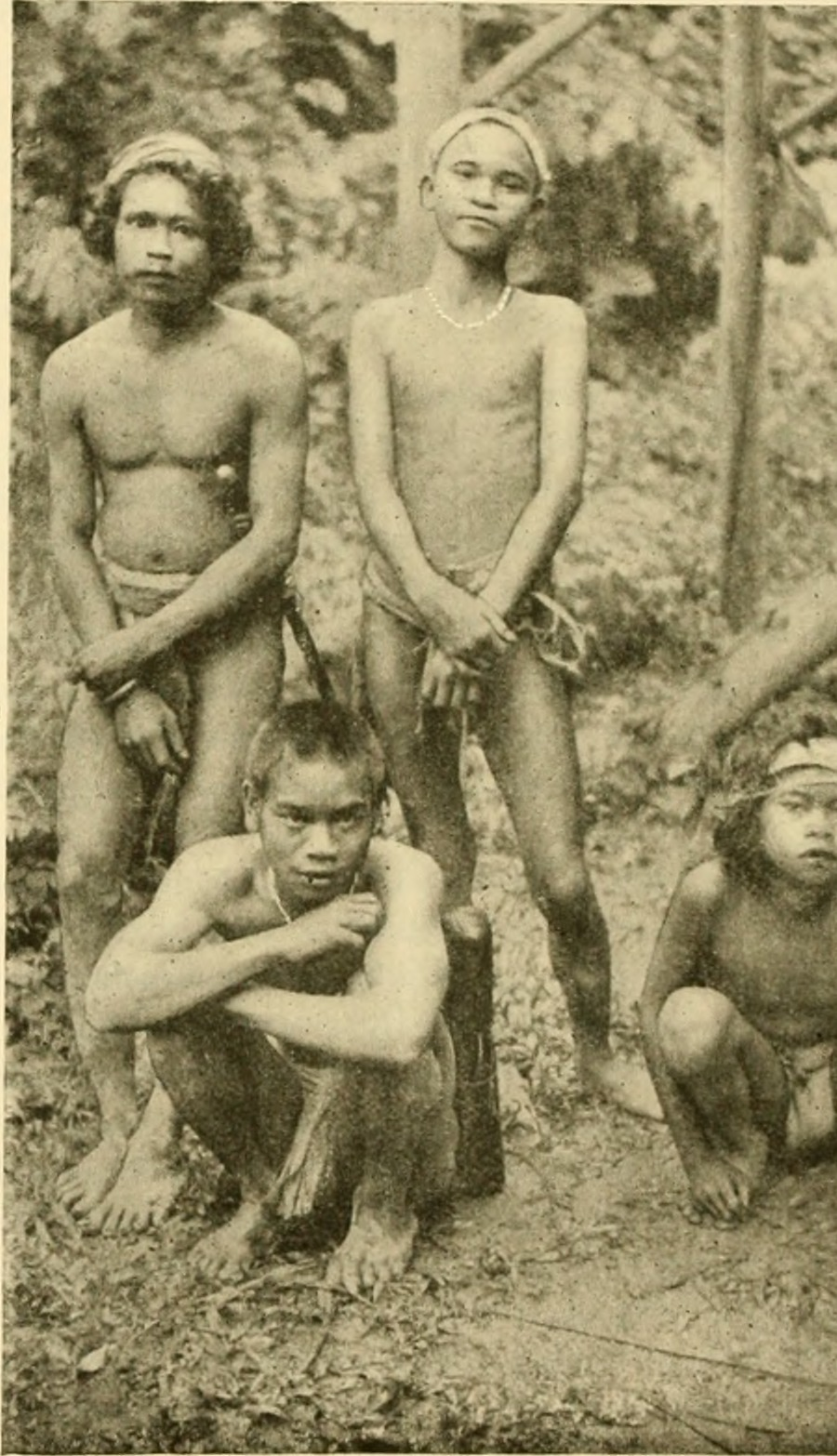
A group of Senoi men from Perak, 1901

Senoi is the largest subdivision of the Orang Asli, accounting for about 54% of their population. This ethnic group includes six tribes: Temiar, Semai, Semaq Beri, Jah Hut, Mah Meri and Cheq Wong. They live mainly in the central and northern parts of the Malay Peninsula. Their villages are scattered in the states of Perak, Kelantan and Pahang, including on the slopes of the Titiwangsa Mountains.

Physically, the Senois in general differ from the indigenous tribals in terms of being taller in height, and having much lighter skin colour, and wavy hair. They were thought to have similar physical characteristics to the Mongoloid (now a discredited racial term) and even the Dravidians. Like the Semang, they also speak Aslian languages. Many Senoi are believed to be descendants of unions of Negritos with migrants from Indochina, probably Proto-Malays.

The term "Senoi" comes from the words sen-oi and seng-oi, which means "people" in Semai language and Temiar language, respectively.

The traditional economy of the Senoi people was based on jungle resources, where they would engage in hunting, fishing, foraging and logging. In contact with the Malay and Siamese states, the Senoi people were involved in trading and were the main suppliers of jungle produce in the region. Now most of them work in the agricultural sector and have their own farms to grow rubber, oil palm, or cocoa.

In the daily life of the Senoi people, the norms of customary laws are observed. Since the days of the colonial era, missionaries of world religions have been active among these jungle dwellers. Now some people among the tribes are adherents of Islam, Christianity, or Baháʼí Faith.

Senoi tribes:

| Tribal name | Traditional occupation (pre-1950s) | Settlement areas | Branch of Aslian languages |
|---|---|---|---|
| Temiar people | slash-and-burn agriculture, trade | Perak, Kelantan | Central Aslian languages |
| Semai people | slash-and-burn agriculture, trade | Perak, Pahang, Selangor | Central Aslian languages |
| Semaq Beri people | slash-and-burn agriculture, hunting-gathering | Terengganu, Pahang | Southern Aslian languages |
| Jah Hut people | slash-and-burn agriculture, trade | Pahang | Jah Hut language |
| Mah Meri people | slash-and-burn agriculture, fishing, hunting-gathering | Selangor | Southern Aslian languages |
| Cheq Wong people | slash-and-burn agriculture, hunting-gathering | Pahang | Southern Aslian languages |

=== Aboriginal Malays ===
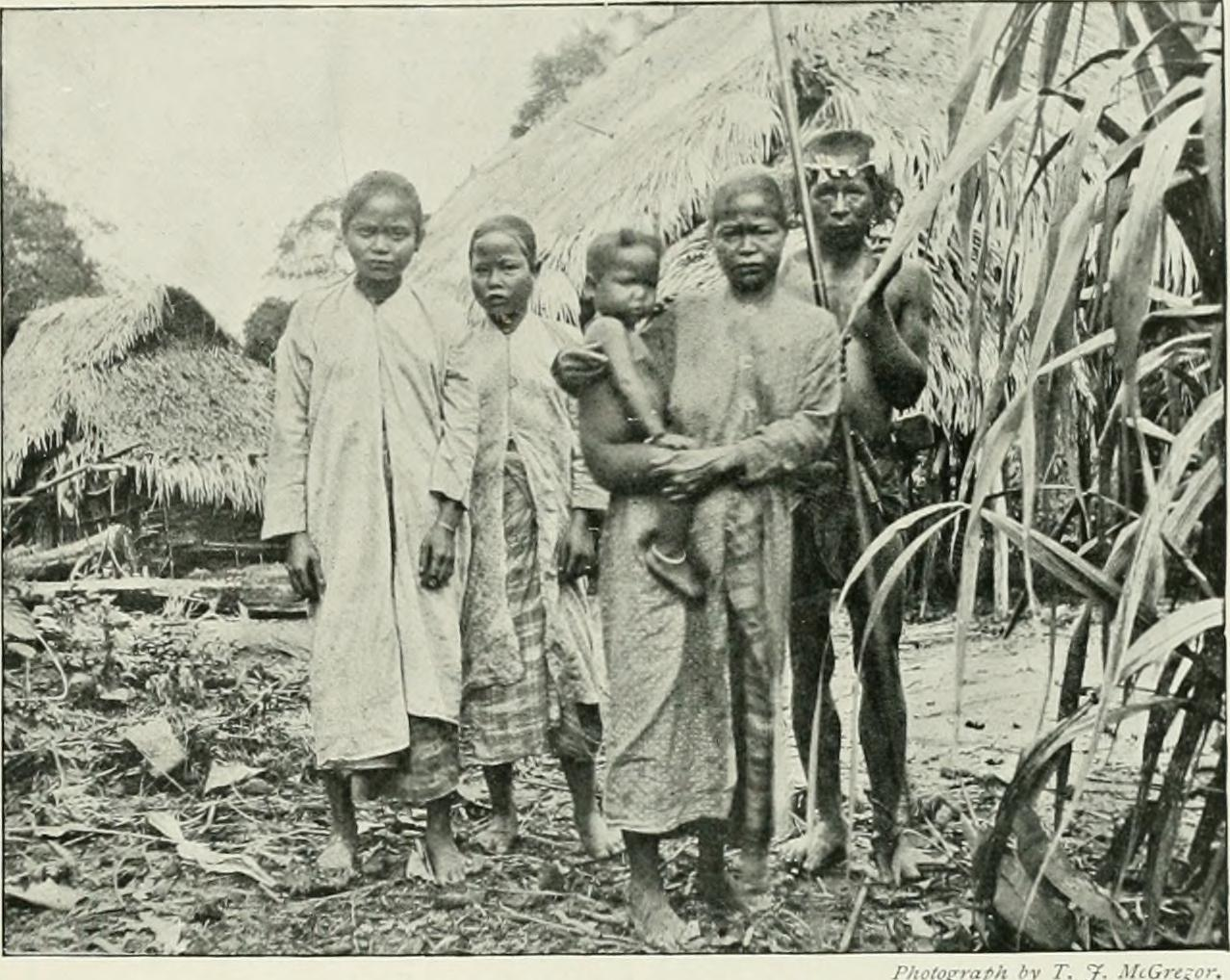
An Aboriginal Malay family in Selangor, 1908

Proto-Malays, or Aboriginal Malays, are the second largest group of Orang Asli, making up about 43%. This group consists of seven separate tribes: Jakun, Temuan, Temoq, Semelai, Kuala, Kanaq, and Seletar people. In the colonial period, they were all erroneously called Jakun people. They live mainly in the southern half of the peninsula, in the states of Selangor, Negeri Sembilan, Melaka, Pahang and Johor. Most of the settlements of the Aboriginal Malays are in the upper reaches of rivers and also along the coastal areas not pre-empted and taken over by the Malays.

Their customs, culture and languages are very similar to the Malaysian Malays. They are similar to the Malays in appearance, having a dark skin colour, straight hair and an epicanthic fold. Today, Aboriginal Malays are firmly settled people, mostly permanently employed in agriculture. Those who live on the river banks or on the coast are engaged in fishing. Many of them are also employed, and there are those who are engaged in entrepreneurial activities or work as professionals.

The group term covers tribes that are very distinct from each other. Temuan people, for example, have a long tradition of agriculture. The Orang Kuala and Orang Seletar, who live by the sea, are mainly engaged in the fishing and seafood industry. Semelai people and Temoq people differ from other groups in language.

The Aboriginal Malays are considered a race of people grouped within each smaller tribe of their own. These had long remained unaffected by foreign influences. The Aboriginal Malays are often distinguished from the Malaysian Malays because they are generally not Muslims, although the Orang Kuala converted to Islam before the independence of Malaysia.

More significant is the differing origins of these sub-groups. In Indonesia and Malaysia, some believe there are two branches of the Austronesian peoples, identified as Proto-Malays and Deutero-Malays. According to this theory, the Proto-Malays inhabited the islands of the Sunda archipelago about 2,500 years ago. The migration of Deutero-Malays is attributed to later times, but more than 1,500 years ago. They mingled with the Proto-Malays who were already inhabiting the land, as well as with the Siamese, Javanese people, Sumatrans, Indian ethnic groups, Thai people, and Persian, Arab and Chinese merchants, resulting in the formation of the modern Malays of the Malay Peninsula. Although this theory has not been supported by scientific evidence, it is generally accepted in the attitude of the Malays toward the indigenous tribes.

Some of the Aboriginal Malay tribes, including the Orang Kanaq and Orang Kuala, are difficult to be regarded as indigenous to the Malay Peninsula, as they only migrated in the last few centuries, much later than the Malays. Most Orang Kuala still live on the eastern coast of Sumatra in Indonesia, where they are also known as the Duano people.

The languages of the Proto-Malays are archaic dialects of the Malay language. The only exceptions are the Semelai language and the Temoq language, which are part of the Aslian languages, as are the Senoi and Semang languages.

Aboriginal Malay tribes:

| Tribal name | Traditional occupation (pre-1950s) | Settlement areas | Languages |
|---|---|---|---|
| Jakun people | agriculture, trade | Pahang, Johor | Malayic languages |
| Temuan people | agriculture, trade | Pahang, Selangor, Negeri Sembilan, Melaka | Malayic languages |
| Semelai people | slash-and-burn agriculture, trade | Pahang, Negeri Sembilan | Southern Aslian languages |
| Temoq people | agriculture, fishing, hunting-gathering | Pahang | Southern Aslian languages |
| Orang Kuala | fishing, other employment | Johor | Malayic languages |
| Orang Kanaq | agriculture, trade | Johor | Malayic languages |
| Orang Seletar | fishing, hunting-gathering | Johor | Malayic languages |

== Demography ==
Malays make up just over 50% of Malaysia's population, followed by Chinese (24%), Indians (7%) and the indigenous of Sabah and Sarawak (11%), while the remaining of Orang Asli is only 0.7%. Their population is approximately 148,000. The largest group are the Senois, constituting about 54% of the total Orang Asli population. The Proto-Malays form 43%, and the Semang forming 3%. Thailand is home to roughly 600 Orang Asli, divided between Mani people with Thai citizenship, and 300 others in the deep south. At the same time, the number of Orang Asli has been growing steadily for many years. Between 1947 and 1997, the average growth rate averaged at 4% per year. This is largely due to the overall improvement in the quality of life of indigenous people.

Population of the Orang Asli:

| Year | 1891 | 1901 | 1911 | 1921 | 1931 | 1947 | 1957 | 1970 | 1980 | 1991 | 2000 | 2010 |
| Population | 9,624 | 17,259 | 30,065 | 32,448 | 31,852 | 34,737 | 41,360 | 53,379 | 65,992 | 98,494 | 132,786 | 160,993 |

Distribution of Orang Asli by state (2010)
1. Pahang - 63,174 (39.2%)
2. Perak - 51,585 (32.0%)
3. Кelantan - 13,123 (8.15%)
4. Selangor - 10,399 (6.46%)
5. Johor - 10,257 (6.37%)
6. Negeri Sembilan - 9,502 (5.90%)
7. Меlaka - 1,502 (0.93%)
8. Тerengganu - 619 (0.38%)
9. Кеdah - 338 (0.21%)
10. Кuala Lumpur - 316 (0.20%)
11. Penang - 156 (0.10%)
12. Perlis - 22 (0.01%)

More than half of the Orang Asli live in the states of Pahang and Perak, followed by the indigenous peoples of Kelantan, Selangor, Johor, and Negeri Sembilan. In the states of Perlis and Penang, the Orang Asli are not considered indigenous. Their presence there indicates the mobility of the Orang Asli, as they come to the industrial areas of the country in search of employment opportunities.

Distribution of Orang Asli tribes by state:

| | Кеdah | Perаk | Кеlantan | Теrengganu | Pahang | Selangor | Negeri Sembilan | Меlaka | Johor | Total |
|---|---|---|---|---|---|---|---|---|---|---|
| Semang | | | | | | | | | | |
| Кеnsiu | 180 | 30 | 14 | | | | | | | 224 |
| Кintaq | | 227 | 8 | | | | | | | 235 |
| Lanoh | | 359 | | | | | | | | 359 |
| Jahai | | 740 | 309 | | | | | | | 1,049 |
| Меndriq | | | 131 | | 14 | | | | | 145 |
| Batek | | | 247 | 55 | 658 | | | | | 960 |
| Senoi | | | | | | | | | | |
| Теmiar | | 8,779 | 5,994 | | 116 | 227 | 6 | | | 15,122 |
| Semai | | 16,299 | 91 | | 9,040 | 619 | | | | 26,049 |
| Semaq Beri | | | | 451 | 2,037 | | | | | 2,488 |
| Jah Hut | | | | | 3,150 | 38 | 5 | | | 3,193 |
| Маh Meri | | | | | | 2,162 | 12 | 7 | 4 | 2,185 |
| Cheq Wong | | 4 | | | 381 | 12 | | | 6 | 403 |
| Proto-Malay | | | | | | | | | | |
| Jakun | | | | | 13,113 | 157 | 14 | | 3,353 | 16,637 |
| Теmuan | | | | | 2,741 | 7,107 | 4,691 | 818 | 663 | 16,020 |
| Semelai | | | | | 2,491 | 135 | 1,460 | 6 | 11 | 4,103 |
| Кuala | | | | | | 10 | | | 2,482 | 2,492 |
| Кanaq | | | | | | | | | 64 | 64 |
| Seletar | | | | | | 5 | | | 796 | 801 |
| Total | 180 | 26,438 | 6,794 | 506 | 33,741 | 10,472 | 6,188 | 831 | 7,379 | 92,529 |

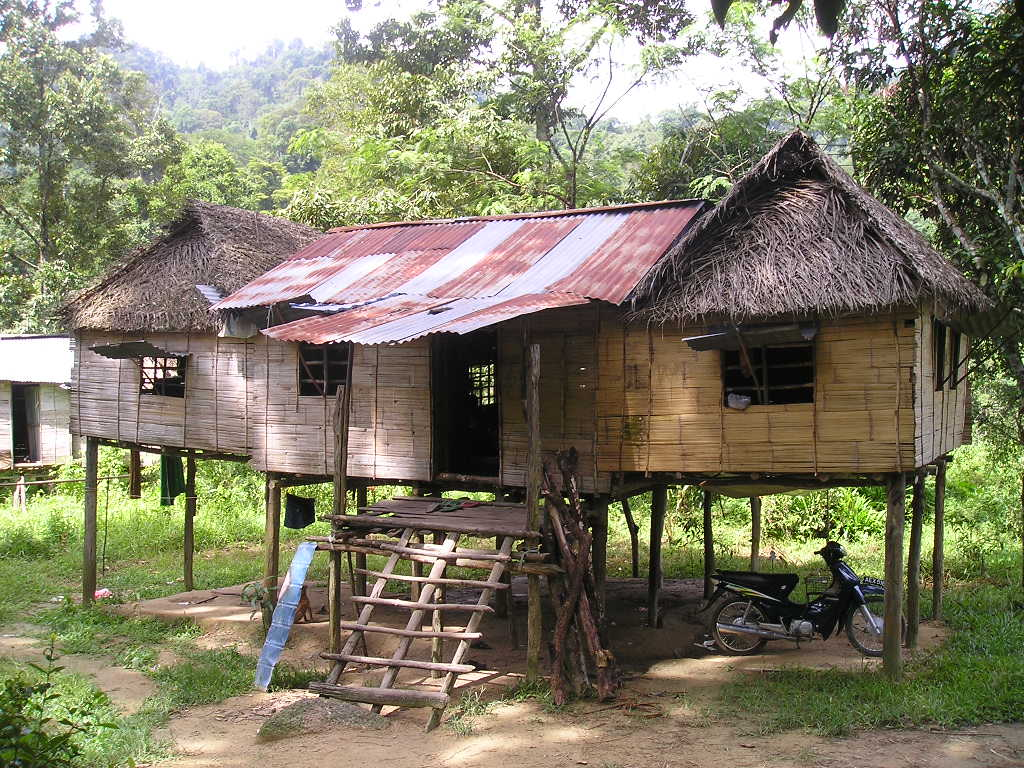
A typical Orang Asli stilt house in Ulu Kinta, Perak

According to the 2006 census, the number of Orang Asli was 141,230. Of these, 36.9% lived in remote villages, 62.4% on the outskirts of Malay villages and 0.7% in cities and suburbs. Thus, the majority of the indigenous population are in rural areas. Some of them make regular trips between their native villages and the cities where they work. Orang Asli do not show much desire to permanently settle in cities because of the high cost of living for them. In addition, they feel out of place in urban communities due to differences in education and socio-economic status, as well as language and racial barriers.

The location of Orang Asli villages largely determines their accessibility and, consequently, the level of state aid they receive, as well as the participation of indigenous peoples in the economic life of the country and the level of their income. As a result, residents of villages located in different areas differ in living standards.

Orang Asli is the poorest community in Malaysia. The poverty rate among Orang Asli is 76.9%. According to the Department of Statistics of Malaysia in 2009, 50% of indigenous people in Peninsular Malaysia were below the poverty line, compared to 3.8% in the country as a whole. In addition to this high rate, the Statistics Department of Malaysia has classified 35.2% of the population as being "very poor". The majority of Orang Asli live in rural areas, while a minority have moved into urban areas. In 1991, the literacy rate for the Orang Asli was 43% compared to the national rate of 86% at that time. They have an average life expectancy of 53 years (52 for male and 54 for female) against the national average of 73 years. The national infant mortality rate in Malaysia in 2010 was 8.9 children per 1,000 live births but among the Orang Asli the figure was at a maximum of 51.7 deaths per 1,000 births.

The Malaysian Government has undertaken various measures to eradicate the poverty level among the Orang Asli, many of them have been relocated from their nomadic and semi-nomadic dwelling to a permanent housing estate under the relocation program initiated by the government. These settlements are equipped with modern amenities including electricity, running water and school. They were also awarded plots of palm oil land to be cultivated and as a source of income. Other programmes initiated by the government includes various special scholarship for the Orang Asli children for their studies and entrepreneurship courses, training and monetary funds for Orang Asli adult. The Malaysian Government aims to increase the monthly household income for Orang Asli from RM 1,200.00 per-month in 2010 to RM 2,500.00 by year 2015.

^{‡} Excluding those living in designated Orang Asli settlements which would amount to about 20,000 more people.
Orang Asli population by groups and subgroups (2000)
| Negrito | Senoi | Proto Malay |
| Bateq (1,519) | Cheq Wong (234) | Jakun (21,484) |
| Jahai (1,244) | Jah Hut (2,594) | Orang Kanaq (73) |
| Kensiu (254) | Mah Meri (3,503) | Orang Kuala (3,221) |
| Kintaq (150) | Semai (34,248) | Orang Seletar (1,037) |
| Lanoh (173) | Semaq Beri (2,348) | Semelai (5,026) |
| Mendriq (167) | Temiar (17,706) | Temuan (18,560) |
| 3,507 | 60,633 | 49,401 |
Total: 113,541^{‡}

Changes in the distribution of Orang Asli by religion (according to JAKOA and the Department of Statistics of Malaysia):

| | 1974 | 1980 | 1991 | 1997 | 2018 |
| Animists | 89% | 86% | 71% | 77% | 66.51% |
| Muslims | 5% | 5% | 11% | 16% | 20.19% |
| Christians | 3% | 4% | 5% | 6% | 9.74% |
| Bahai | - | - | - | - | 2.85% |
| Buddha | - | - | - | - | 0.57% |
| Hindu | - | - | - | - | 0.15% |
| Others | 3% | 5% | 13% | 1% | - |

== Languages ==
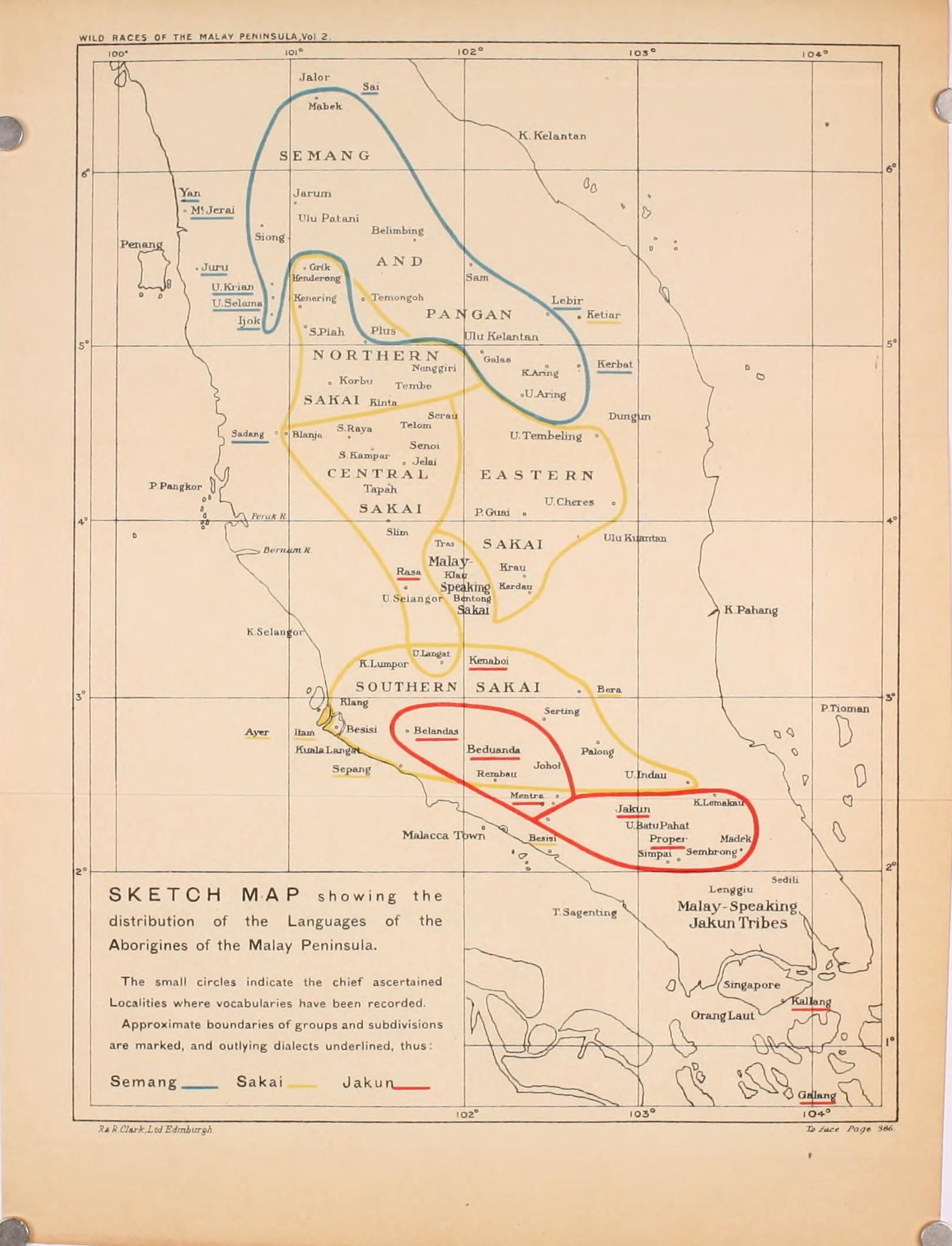
A map showing the distribution of the indigenous Orang Asli of Malay Peninsula by language branch

Linguistically the Orang Asli divide into two groups: from the Austroasiatic languages and the Austronesian languages family.

Northern groups (Senoi and Semang) speak languages that are grouped into a separate Aslian languages group, which form part of the Austroasiatic language family. On the basis of language, these peoples have historical ties with the indigenous peoples of Myanmar, Thailand and the larger Indochina. These are further divided into the Jahaic languages (North Aslian), Senoic languages, Semelaic languages (South Aslian), and Jah Hut language. The languages which fall under the Jahaic language sub-group are the Cheq Wong, Jahai, Bateq, Kensiu, Mintil, Kintaq, and Mendriq languages. The Lanoh language, Temiar language, and Semai language fall into the Senoic language sub-group. Languages that fall into the Semelaic sub-group include the Semelai language, Semoq Beri language, Temoq language, and Besisi language (language spoken by the Mah Meri people).

The second group that speaks Aboriginal Malay languages, except Semelai language and Temoq language, is very close to the standard Malay language, which form part of the Austronesian language family. These include the Jakun and Temuan languages among others. Semelai people and Temoq people speak Austroasiatic languages, with the latter are not distinguished in Malaysia as a separate people.

According to Geoffrey Benjamin, a leading specialist in the study of Aslian languages and project Ethnologue: Languages of the World (20th edition, 2017) classifies the 18 Orang Asli tribes of Peninsular Malaysia linguistically as the following:

- Austroasiatic languages
  - Mon-Khmer languages
    - Aslian languages
      - Northern group (Jahaic languages)
        - Western subgroup
          - Kensiu language (ISO-3 code: kns)
          - Kintaq language (ISO code: knq)
        - Eastern subgroup
          - Jahai language (ISO-3 code: jhi)
          - Mindriq language (ISO-3 code: mnq)
          - Mintil language (ISO-3 code: mzt)
          - Batek language (ISO-3 code: btq)
        - Cheq Wong subgroup
          - Cheq Wong language (ISO-3 code: cwg)
      - Central group (Senoic languages)
        - Lanoh subgroup
          - Lanoh language (ISO-3 code: lnh)
        - Temiar subgroup
          - Temiar language (ISO-3 code: tea)
        - Semai subgroup
          - Semai language (ISO-3 code: sea)
      - Jah Hut group
        - Jah Hut subgroup
          - Jah Hut language (ISO-3 code: jah)
      - Southern group (Semelaic languages)
        - Mah Meri subgroup
          - Mah Meri language (ISO-3 code: mhe)
        - Semaq Beri subgroup
          - Semaq Beri language (ISO-3 code: szc)
        - Semelai subgroup
          - Semelai language (ISO-3 code: sza)
        - Temoq group
          - Temoq language (ISO-3 code: tmo)
- Austronesian languages
  - Malayo-Polynesian languages
    - Malayo-Chamic languages
      - Malayic languages
        - Malayan languages
          - Jakun language (ISO-3 code: jak)
          - Duanoʼ language (ISO-3 code: dup)
          - Orang Kanaq language (ISO-3 code: orn)
          - Orang Seletar language (ISO-3 code: ors)
          - Temuan language (ISO-3 code: tmq)

Although the study of Orang Asli began in the early 20th century, even by the 1960s there was very little professional research. Intensive early 1990s field research spawned a new wave of scholarly material and yet, these languages still remain only somewhat fully understood. There is a threat of extinction of certain Orang Asli languages. Almost all Orang Asli are now bilingual; in addition to their native language, they are also fluent Malay language, the national language of Malaysia. Malay is gradually displacing native languages, reducing their scope at the domestic level.

The role of lingua franca between Orang Asli speakers is usually played by the Semai language or Temiar language, which establishes a dominant presence. The state of the Northern Aslian languages also remains stable. Nomadic groups who speak them have little contact with the Malays, and although these populations are small, their languages are not threatened with extinction. Today, the Lanoh language belongs to the category of endangered languages, but among others, the Mah Meri language is in the greatest danger. The continuance of these languages can be found in radio broadcasts, which did not begin in Orang Asli until in 1959. Asyik.FM currently broadcasts daily in Radio Malaysia in Semai, Temyar, Teman and Jakun languages from 8 am to 11 pm. The channel is also available via the Internet.

In Malaysia, Orang Asli languages lack both natively-written literature and official status. However, some Baháʼí Faith and Christian missionaries, as well as JAKOA newsletters, produce printed materials in Aslian languages. Orang Asli value literacy, but they are unlikely to be able to support writing in their native language based on Malay or English. Private texts recorded by radio announcers is based on Malay and English writing and are amateur in nature. The authors face the problems of transcription and spelling, and the influence of the stamps characteristic of the standard Malay language is felt. A new phenomenon is an emergence of text messages in the Orang Asli language, which are distributed by their speakers, in particular, when using mobile phones. Unfortunately, due to fears of invasion of privacy, most of them are not made known to outsiders. Another development in the development of indigenous languages was the release of individual recordings of pop music in Aslian languages, which can be heard on Asyik FM.

In some states of Malaysia, attempts are being made to introduce Orang Asli languages into the educational process of primary school to bolster school attendance to benefit the overall Malaysian education system. Without sufficient studies and a standardisation of spelling these efforts have been unsuccessful.

== History ==
=== First settlers ===
Location of Orang Asli groups, and the evolution and assimilation of settlers on the Malay Peninsula

The earliest traces of modern humans in the Malay Peninsula, archaeologists date back to a period of about 75,000 years ago. Next, a number of evidence of ancient people living in the north of the peninsula were left about 40,000 years ago. The climate and geography of Southeast Asia at that time were vastly different from today. During the Ice age period, the sea level was much lower, the seabed between the islands of the Sunda archipelago was then land, and the Asian mainland extended to present-day Sumatra, Java, Bali, Kalimantan, Palawan, forming the so-called Sundaland.

Global warming about 10,000 years ago caused glacier melt and rising sea levels resulting in the formation of the Malayan peninsula by approximately 8,000 years ago. It is believed that the surviving prehistoric population were the ancestors of today's Semang people. Recent genetic studies identify them as a relic group of people who are descendants of the first migrants who came from Africa between 44,000 and 63,000 years ago. This does not mean, however, that they have survived to this day in their original form. Over thousands of years, they have undergone local evolution. Thus, the Hoabinhian inhabitants of the Malay Peninsula were taller than the modern Semang people and did not belong to the Negrito race. Recent studies have also shown genetic differences between Semang people and other Negritos, such as the indigenous Andamanese peoples and those from the Philippine Islands.

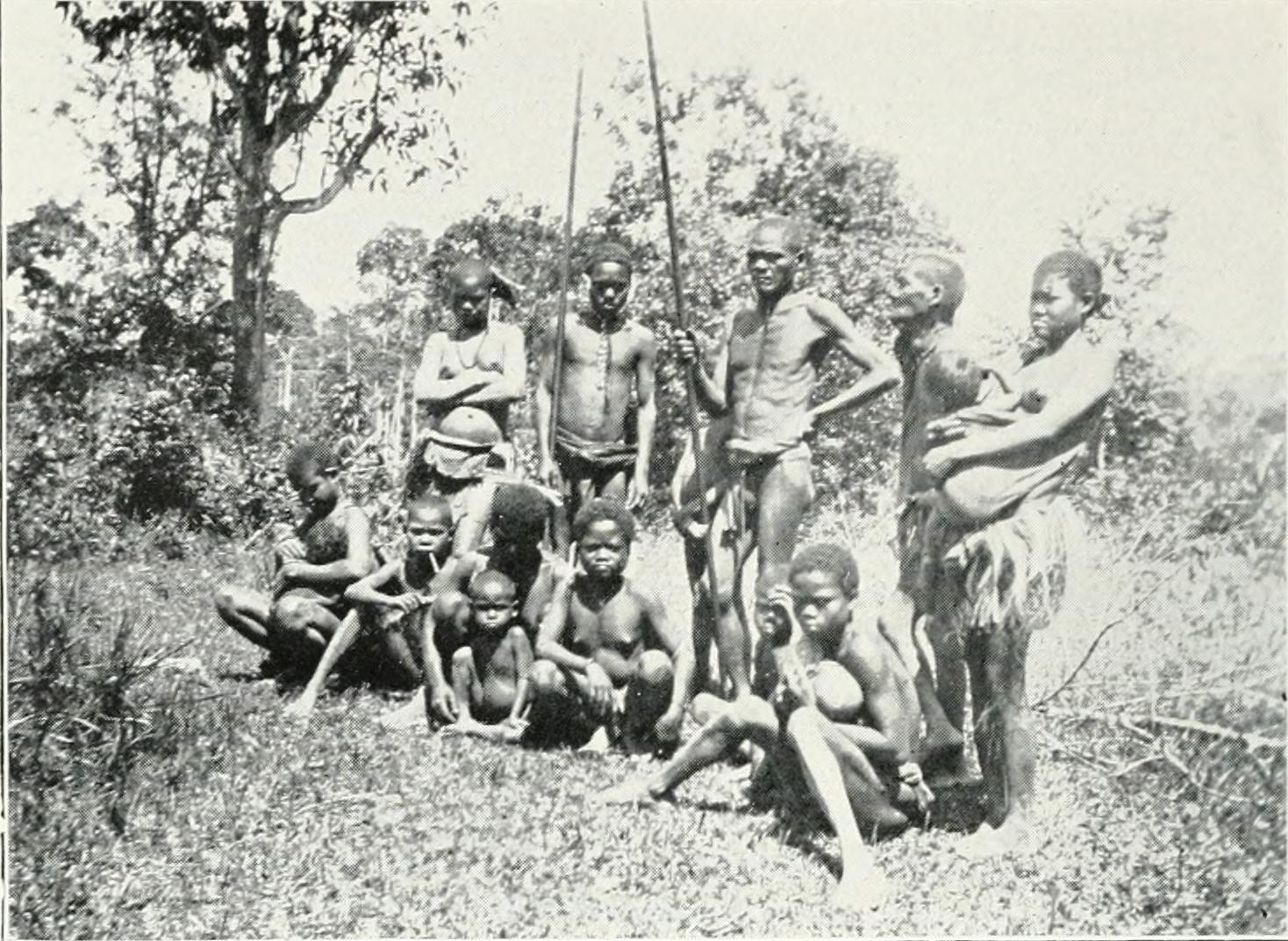
Semang from Gerik or Janing, Perak, 1906

Evidence of early human occupation of the Peninsula includes prehistoric artefacts and cave paintings such as the Tambun rock art, which is estimated to be around 2,000 to 12,000 years old. About 6,000–6,500 years ago, climatic conditions stabilised. This period is marked by the appearance of the Neolithic on the Malay Peninsula, which is associated with the archaeological culture of Hòa Bình. New groups of people genetically related to the population of Thailand, Cambodia and Vietnam arrived on the Malay Peninsula bringing new technologies, better tools, and ceramics. In the peninsula, slash-and-burn agriculture was commonly practiced. Traditionally, these migrants are associated with the ancestors of the Senoi people, but genetic studies suggest that the influx of new population was small, and migrants were mixed with locals.

According to Glottochronology data, speakers of Aslian languages appeared in the Malay Peninsula, dating from about 3,800 to 3,700 years ago. This is consistent with the peninsula ceramic tradition of Ban Kao from Central Thailand. During 2,800–2,400 years ago, the differentiation of the North Aslian language, Central Aslian languages and Southern Aslian languages began to develop.

=== Early history ===
Some groups of the Austronesian speakers began to arrive in the Malay Peninsula, probably from Kalimantan and Sumatra, in 1000 BCE. According to linguists, some of these early non-Malay arrivals are of Malayo-Polynesian peoples. These Proto-Malay tribes inhabited mostly small, geographically divided groups along the coast and along rivers, while the inner jungle areas remained entirely with the native population. Each group of Proto-Malays developed their local character, adapting to specific local conditions. The Southern Aslian speakers had the greatest contact with the newer population. It is believed that the ancestors of Jakun people and Temuan people who now speak Malay language, were native speakers of Aslian in the past.

The Orang Asli kept to themselves until the first traders from India arrived in the first millennium of the Common Era. Maritime trade routes brought traders from India, China, the Mon kingdoms located in modern-day Myanmar, and later from the Khmer Empire of Angkor, in search of local produce. Those living in the interior bartered inland products like resins, incense woods, and feathers for salt, cloth, and iron tools. From about 500 BCE, on the west coast of the Malay Peninsula and on either side of the Kra Isthmus, traders established their settlements, some of which later grew into large trading ports. At that time Kedah, in particular, was becoming an important center of international trade.

=== Relations with other groups ===
The development of the slave trade in the region was a powerful factor influencing the fate of the Orang Asli. The enslavement of Negrito tribes commenced as early as 724 CE, during the early contact of the Malay Srivijaya empire. Negrito pygmies from the southern jungles were enslaved, with some being exploited until modern times. Because Islam prohibited taking Muslims as slaves,^{[Sahih al-Bukhari 148]} slave hunters focused their capture on the Orang Asli explaining the Malay use sakai to mean "slaves" with its present derogatory connotation. In the early 16th century Aceh Sultanate, located in the north of the island of Sumatra, equipped special expeditions to capture slaves in the Malay Peninsula, and Malacca was at that time the largest center of the slave trade in the region. Raids on slaves in the villages of Orang Asli were common in the 18th and 19th centuries. During this time, Orang Asli groups suffered raids by the Minangkabau and Batak forces who perceived them to be of lower in status. Orang Asli settlements were sacked, with adult males being systematically executed while women and children were taken captive and sold into slavery. Hamba abdi (meaning, bondslaves) formed the labour force both in the cities and in the households of chiefs and sultans. They could be servants and concubines of a rich master, and slaves also did labour work in commercial ports.

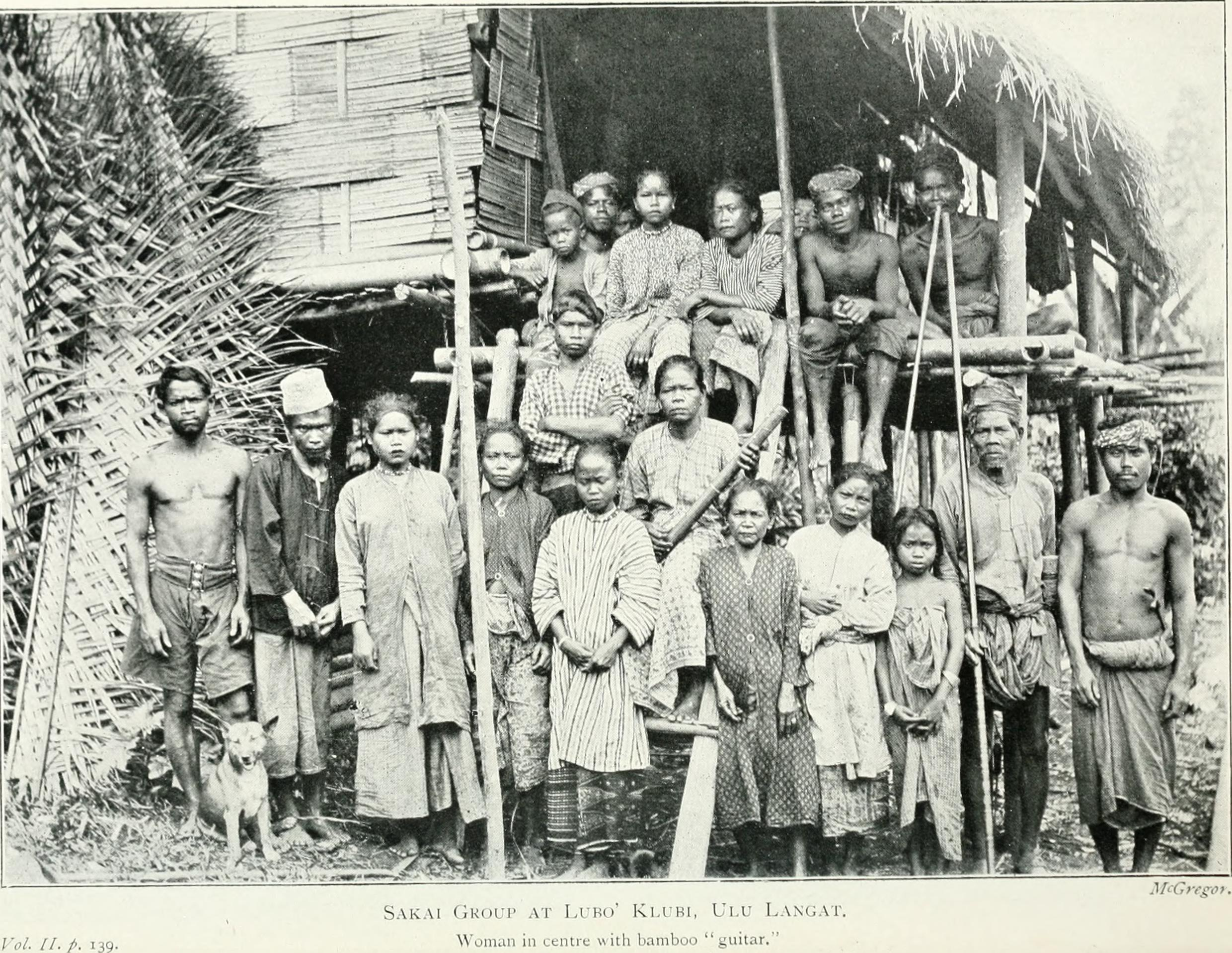
The Orang Asli of Hulu Langat in 1906

However, the relationship between the Malays and Orang Asli was not always hostile, as many other groups enjoyed peaceful and cordial relation with their Malay neighbours. With the easement of mobility and contact between various groups of people, the walls that separated the myriad of historical Austroasiatic and Austronesian tribal communities who once dwelled across the peninsula were dismantled, being gradually drawn and integrated into the Malay society, identity, language, culture and belief system. These Malayised tribes and communities would later be part of the ancestors of present-day Malay people.

The new situation prompted many Orang Asli to migrate further inland to avoid contact with outsiders. These other smaller, closely related tribes; often located further inland compared to their coastal Malayised cousins, managed to be spared from the Malayisation process due to their secluded geographical location and nomadic and semi-nomadic lifestyle, hence preserving and developing their own endemic language, customs and pagan rituals. They were fragmented into small isolated tribal groups that occupied certain ecological niches, such as the river valley and had limited contact with neighbouring outsiders. Malay settlements were usually located on the coast or along rivers, as the Malays rarely crossed into the interior jungles. Nevertheless, some Orang Asli groups not completely isolated from their Malayalised brothers engaged in trade with the Malays. A minority of Orang Asli rejected assimilation including the indigenous tribes of the Malay Peninsula as well as the Orang Kanaq or the Orang Seletar who refused Islam.

=== Colonial period ===
The establishment of British colonial settlements in the peninsula brought further foreign influence into the lives of Orang Asli. The British colonial government began to recognise the Malays as "natives", and the Orang Asli as "aborigines", as the latter were subjects of the Malay rulers, marking the beginning of a policy of paternalism toward the Orang Asli. The British colonial administration formally banned all forms of slavery in the Malay Peninsula in 1884, but in practice, it continued to exist even in 1930. While the British authorities took little interest in the plight of Orang Asli, Christian missionaries began preaching to the Orang Asli. Anthropologists saw in the indigenous population of the peninsula an unploughed field for their study and an interesting subject for research.

During British rule, the ethnic character of the peninsula population changed significantly. The development of the colonial economy caused a significant influx of Chinese and Indian people. Chinese traders also appeared in the settlements of the Orang Asli. Due to the traditional antipathy to the Malays, the indigenous Orang Asli were more inclined to improve relations with the Chinese, who were perceived as reliable trading partners.

During the Japanese occupation of Malaya in the 1940s, most Orang Asli hid in the jungles bringing them into contact with the ethnic Chinese Malayan Peoples' Anti-Japanese Army also taking refuge in the jungle. With the end of World War II, the British returned to the Malay Peninsula. The Malayan Communist Party tried unsuccessfully to gain influence over the post-war government, and in 1948 the Communists returned to the jungle to launch an armed uprising triggering the Malayan Emergency which lasted from 1948 to 1960. Many secluded jungle Orang Asli villages became strategic locations frequented by the communist guerrillas of the Malayan National Liberation Army increasing cooperation between the two. The positive attitude of the Orang Asli towards the Chinese, in comparison with the Malays, was noticeable.

The British government understood the importance of the indigenous population in this situation and began to implement measures aimed at removing the Orang Asli from the influence of the Communists and encouraging them to support government forces. Strategically, the goal was to cut off the rebels from the bases and put an end to the uprising. Due to their perceived support for communist guerrillas, the first step was the implementation of a programme to forcibly relocate the Orang Asli from the areas of communist influence to the so-called "new village" system where they were sent to live in newly-constructed settlements controlled by the government under the Briggs Plan. Such a policy proved tragic for the indigenous population. Orang Asli crowds relocated hastily built resettlement camps. Hundreds of people detached from traditional lands have died in these overcrowded camps, mostly due to mental depression and infectious diseases.

Realising the absurdity and flaws of their actions, the British administration changed tactics. Two administrative initiatives were introduced to highlight the importance of the Orang Asli, as well as to protect their identity. First, the Department of Aborigines was established in 1950, which was to take over the implementation of state policy towards the Orang Asli. Secondly, the British abandoned the "new villages" and began to create so-called "forts in the jungle", located within the traditional lands of indigenous communities. These reference points were provided with basic medical institutions, schools, and points of supply of basic consumer goods, designed for Orang Asli. Subsequently, the forts ceased their activities, and the Orang Asli began to create so-called exemplary settlements called Patterned Settlements. A number of Orang Asli communities have been relocated to these settlements, which are accessible to Aboriginal and Security Department officials and yet close to traditional indigenous ancestral lands. They promised to provide their residents with wooden houses on stilts, as well as modern amenities such as schools, hospitals and shops. They also had to grow commercial crops (rubber, palm oil) and practice animal husbandry in order to be able to participate in the monetary economy. This strategy was successful, and support for the rebels from the Orang Asli weakened.

Finally, an attempt was made to legislate to protect the indigenous population, the Aboriginal Peoples Ordinance resolution was enacted in 1954; which, with some modifications, still operates today. Thus, the circumstances of the State of Emergency had brought the Orang Asli out of isolation.

=== Post-independence ===
Malaysia declared independence in 1957. Shortly before the proclamation of independence, there were about 20,000 Muslims among the Orang Asli; after independence, most of them were recognised by the Malays. The rest continued to live in inland forest areas and adhere to their traditional way of life. They remained outside the country's development until the late 1970s, forming a specific marginalized population. A 1961 government policy was created to develop and integrate Orang Asli communities into the wider Malaysian society. The Malaysian government retained the Department of Aborigines, but changed its name to the Malay, Jabatan Orang Asli (Department of Orang Asli, abbreviated JOA), later renaming it to Jabatan Hal Ehwal Orang Asli (Department of Orang Asli Affairs, abbreviated JHEOA), and finally since 2011, the Jabatan Kemajuan Orang Asli (Department of Orange Asli Development, abbreviated JAKOA). This procession of government bureaus existed to manage the Orang Asli communities, providing them with medical care, education, and economic development. The Aboriginal People Act 1954, which gave JHEOA broad powers to control the Orang Asli, also remained in force. State intervention in the life of the indigenous population during the years of independence intensified markedly and measures shifted from preservation of the Orang Asli to their full assimilation into Malay society.

In the late 1960s, the Malayan Communist Party resumed its armed struggle and began the so-called Second Malayan Emergency (1968–1989). Again, the main rebel bases located in the inner jungle areas drew government attention to the Orang Asli as a likely ally of the rebels. A military decision was made to physically remove the Orang Asli from their traditional environment. In 1977 a new project for the resettlement of indigenous people was presented, and it was now called the Regroupment Schemes (Rancangan Pengumpulan Semula, RPS). Given the mistakes of the past, the process of "regrouping" also involved the implementation of development programmes, and the regrouping schemes themselves were created within the customary lands of the respective Orang Asli communities or close to them. In addition to the provision of medical and educational services, the participants in the schemes were provided with permanent land plots for housing construction and homesteading. They were also involved in one form or another in income-generating activities, mainly the cultivation of commercial crops such as rubber and oil palm.

The 1980s were a turning point in the history of the Orang Asli. During this decade, the pace of economic development in Malaysia was the highest, as Malaysia began to experience a period of sustained growth characterised by modernisation, industrialisation, and land development, which resulted in seizure of Orang Asli land. Logging and the replacement of jungles with plantations have become widespread, further encroaching on traditional Orang Asli resources.

Government policy towards integration took the form of Islamisation. The Malaysian government established an institution of Islamic missionary work, Dawah, which was to operate in indigenous communities. Special community development officials, Pegawai Pemaju Masyarakat were appointed, and public buildings, Balai Raya are equipped with Muslim prayer halls called Surau that were built in the villages of Orang Asli. JHEOA tried to provide converts to Islam with housing, water and electricity, and vehicles. They were paid for schooling, provided with scholarships for university studies, and created better opportunities in the field of health care, in terms of income and promotion in the civil service.

The policy of "positive discrimination" provoked a negative reaction in the Orang Asli communities. Many of them refused to convert to Islam, even in spite of the advantages afforded to them. Others, in response to the situation, out of poverty nominally converted to Islam, but made no effort to change their religious beliefs or behaviour.

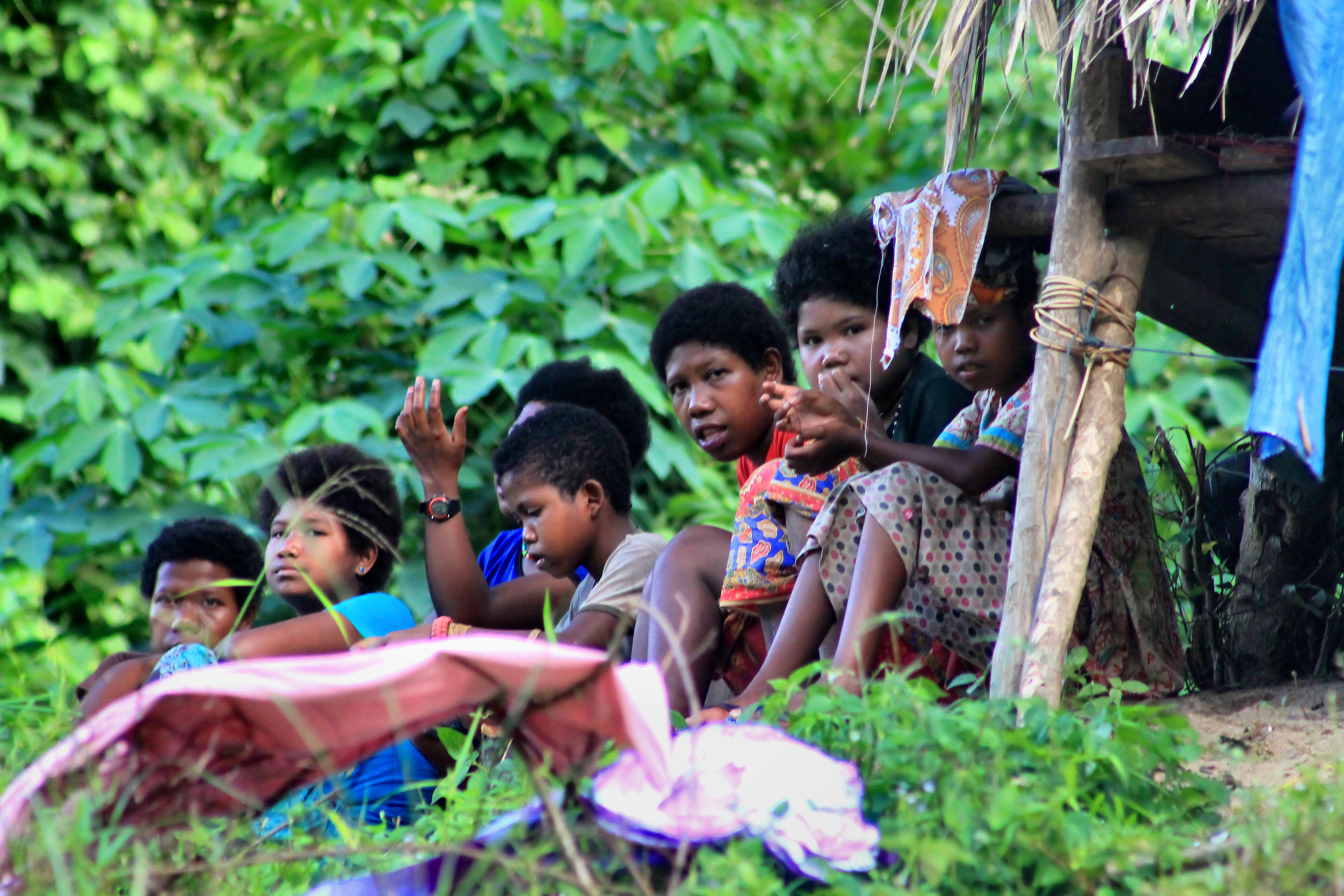
Batek people near Taman Negara

Indigenous responses to the seizure of their customary lands and resources ranged from a repressed tacit perception of the situation and simple political lobbying of their interests to loud protests and demands for legal protection. In response to this encroachment, a landmark mobilisation in 1976 created the Peninsular Malaysia Orang Asli Association (Persatuan Orang Asli Semenanjung Malaysia, POASM). POASM became a focal point that integrated the grievances and needs of Orang Asli communities. The organisation's popularity grew, and in 2011 it had about 10,000 members. In 1998, POASM became a collective member of the Malaysian Indigenous Network (Jaringan Orang Asal SeMalaysia, abbreviated JOAS), an informal association of indigenous organisations and movements in Sabah, Sarawak, and Peninsular Malaysia. Slowing in POASM advocacy led to the creation of Network of Orang Asli Peninsular Malaysia Villages (Jaringan Kampung Orang Asli Semenanjung Malaysia), an informal association of Orang Asli, advocating for the rights of the country's indigenous peoples and representing the Orang Asli's interests to the government and the general public. The Centre for Orang Asli Concerns (COAC), established in 1989, provides assistance in this regard. The 1992 United Nations Conference on Environment and Development brought more attention to traditional knowledge and rights of the indigenous peoples like the Orang Asli. The United Nations' declaration of 1994-2003 as the International Decade of the World's Indigenous People also had a positive effect. Orang Asli are now known as Orang Kita ("our people") following the introduction of the "One Malaysia" concept by then-Prime Minister of Malaysia Najib Razak.

== Culture ==
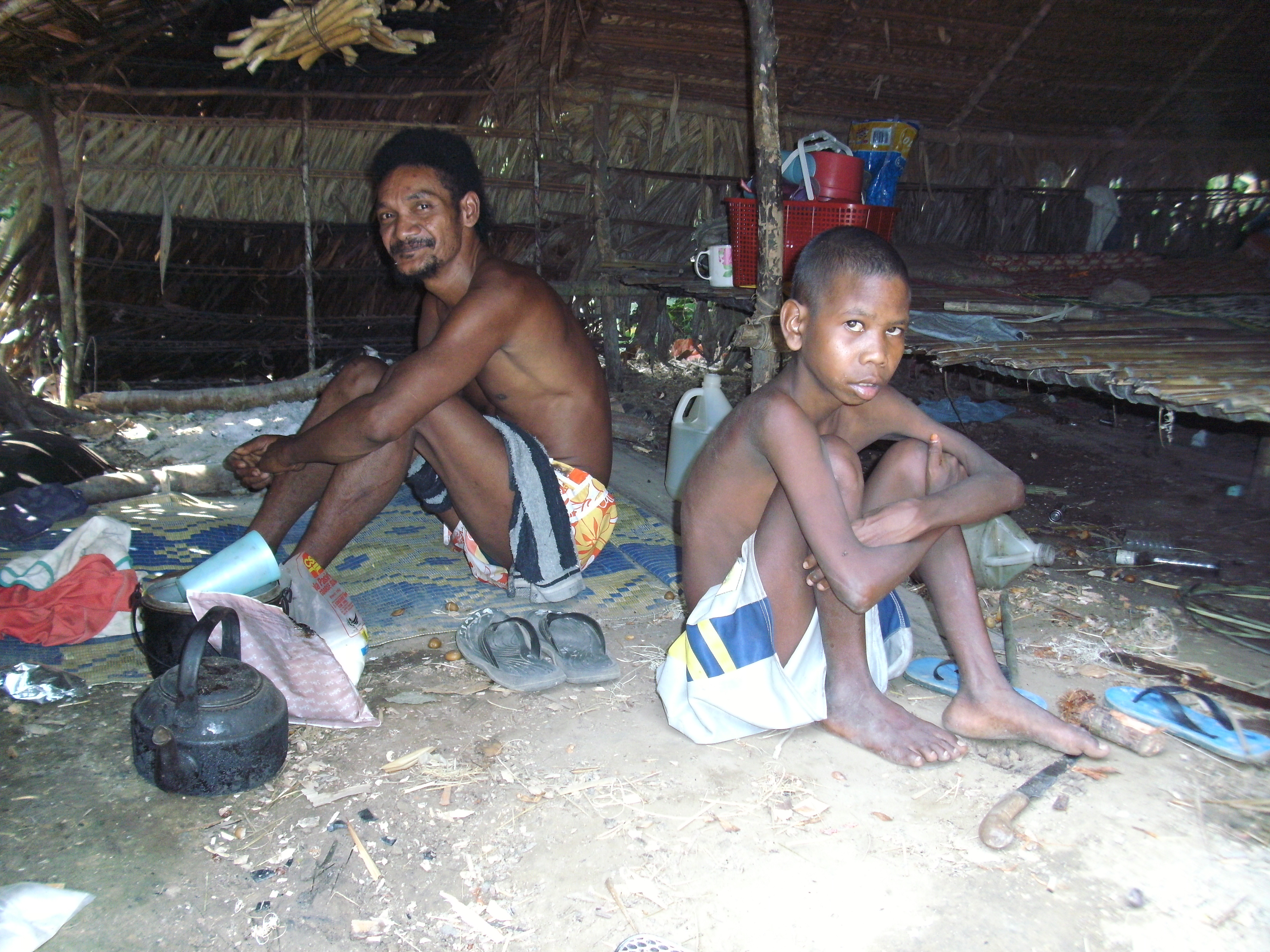
An Orang Asli man and a boy, indoors

The way of life and management of certain groups of Orang Asli differs markedly. There are three main traditions that existed in the past, the nomadic hunter-gatherers Semangs, the settled population engaged in slash-and-burn agriculture Senois, and settled farmers who additionally collect jungle produce for sale Proto-Malays. Each of these traditions corresponds to a certain social structure of society.

About 40% of Orang Asli, including the Temiar people, Cheq Wong people, Jah Hut people, Semelai people, and Semaq Beri people, continue to live in or near jungles. Here they are engaged in slash-and-burn agriculture (growing Upland rice on the hills), as well as hunting and gathering. In addition, these communities sell foraged jungle resources (petai, durian, rattan, wild rubber) in exchange for money. Coastal communities (Orang Kuala, Orang Seletar and Mah Meri people) are mainly engaged in fishing and seafood harvesting. Others, including Temuan people, Jakun people and Semai people, are constantly engaged in agriculture, and now also have their own plantations for growing rubber, oil palm and cocoa. Very few Orang Asli, especially among Negrito groups (such as the Jahai people and Lanoh people), still lead a semi-nomadic lifestyle and prefer to enjoy the seasonal bounties of the jungle. Many Orang Asli also lives in cities where they work as hired workers.

Nomadic groups, such as the Jahai people and Batek people, live in families that occasionally gather together in temporary camps and then separate from each other again, but to reunite in a new camp and in a different composition. Some agricultural groups, such as the Temiar people, are organised into extended families and small groups linked by a common origin. They trace their descent from a common ancestor along both male and female lineages. The Semang and Senoi ethnic groups are politically and socially egalitarian, where everyone in the community is completely autonomous. If they have their leaders, they exercise only temporary situational power, which is based solely on the personal authority of a certain person. Such a leader has no real authority. At the same time, some southern groups, including the Semelai people, the Jakun people, and the Temuan people, had their own hereditary batin (meaning, village head) leaders in the past.

All Orang Asli consider their customary territories to be free for gathering by all members of the community. In some groups, individual families have exclusive rights to the agricultural land they cultivate, which they have cleared from the jungle on their own. However, when such a field is abandoned and overgrown with jungle, it returns to the common property of the whole community.

One remarkable feature of Orang Asli communities is that they prohibit any interpersonal violence, both within their groups and in relationships with outsiders. Their survival strategy has traditionally been to avoid contact with the country's dominant populations, and they teach their children to refrain from all forms of violence.

The rules governing marriage differ from one tribe to another Orang Asli. In Semangs, social structures are adapted to the nomadic way of life of hunter-gatherers. They are forbidden to marry and have intimate relations with blood or related relatives through marriage. These rules of exogamy require one to look for a spouse among distant groups, thus creating a wide network of social ties. The tradition of Senoi is associated with the practice of slash-and-burn agriculture. Their local groups are more stable than those of the Semangs, therefore the prohibition of marriages between relatives is not so strict, as a result, family ties are concentrated within a certain river valley. The Malay tradition is associated with a sedentary lifestyle, so Malays and Aboriginal Malays prefer to marry within a village or locality, and marriages between cousins are allowed. This practice of local endogamy strengthens people's commitment to their own economic system and keeps them from accepting other traditions. Such differences in views on the rules of marriage allowed for several thousand years to coexist side by side and not to intermarry with groups with very different economic complexities.

Traditional Orang Asli religions consist of complex systems of beliefs and worldviews that give these people the concept of the meaning of the world, the meaning of human life, and the moral code of conduct. Orang Asli is traditionally animists, where they believe in the presence of spirits in various objects. It allows the indigenous people to be in constant harmony with the natural environment. Most Orang Asli believes that the universe consists of three worlds, namely the celestial upper world, the terrestrial middle world, and the subterranean lower world. All three worlds are inhabited by various supernatural beings (spirits, ghosts, deities), which can be both helpful and harmful to humans. Some of these supernatural beings are individualised entities that have their own names and are associated with specific natural phenomena, such as thunderstorms, floods, or fruit ripening. Most Orang Asli believes in the "God of Thunder", who will punish people by sending them a terrible storm.

Traditional Orang Asli rituals are designed to maintain a harmonious relationship between humans and supernatural beings. They offer sacrifices to the spirits, praise and gratitude, ask permission to kill animals during hunting, cut down trees, plant cultivated plants, and ask for abundant harvests of wild fruits. More complex rituals are performed by shamans, many of whom have their own spiritual guides in the spirit world. Most of these people believe that spells can cure diseases or ensure success in any field of activity, usually with the help of supernatural beings. During those ritual sessions, the shaman falls into a trance, and his soul goes to travel the worlds, looking for the lost souls of sick people, or meets with supernatural beings and asks them for help.

However, in the 21st century, many of them have also embraced monotheistic religions such as Islam and Christianity following some active state-sponsored dakwah by Muslims, and evangelism by Christian missionaries. Pahang Islamic Religious and Malay Customs Council (Majlis Ugama Islam Dan Adat Resam Melayu Pahang, MUIP) filed new Orang Asli Muslim converts from Pahang in 2015 alone. On June 4, 2007, an Orang Asli church was allegedly torn down by the state government in Gua Musang, Kelantan. In January 2008, a suit was filed against the Kelantan state authorities. The affected Orang Asli also sought a declaration under Article 11 of the Constitution of Malaysia that they have the right to practice the religion of their choice and to build their own prayer house. A major scandal involving the deaths of several escapee Orang Asli students led to a discussion over the role of religious indoctrination in schools and forced conversion of Orang Asli community to Islam by the state government.

Some of their methodology, which the Orang Asli themselves take for granted, seems to gain the attention of Westerners. Andy Hickson and his mother, Sue Jennings, after living in the Temiar community for more than a year, not only appreciated the nation's social heritage but also began to apply it in their practice. Andy Hickson, who works as a consultant in the education system, began to use interactive methods of Temiar people in the fight against the phenomenon of intimidation of students. Therapist Sue Jennings applies aspects of the Temiar ritual traditions in her group therapy sessions.

The Orang Asli have a tradition of keeping binturongs as pets.

== Rights and status in society ==
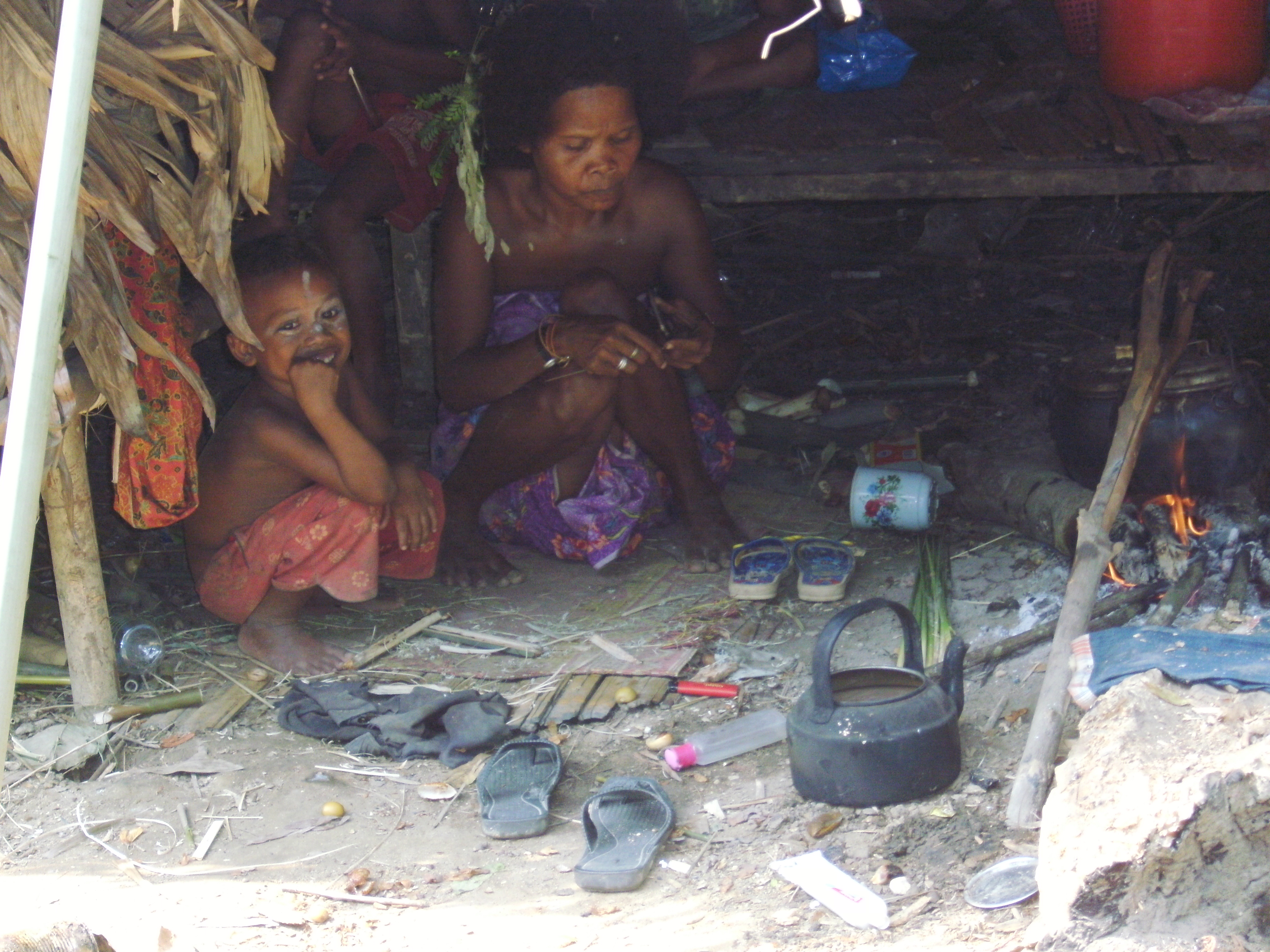
An Orang Asli woman and a child indoors

The Aboriginal Peoples Act is the only law that specifically applies to the Orang Asli. It defines and describes in detail the terms and concepts for recognising the status of Orang Asli communities. Legally, Orang Asli is defined as members of an indigenous ethnic group who are of such origin or who have been admitted into the community by adoption, or they are children from mixed marriages with the indigenous, provided that they speak the indigenous language and follow the way of life, customs and beliefs of the indigenous people. Preservation of the traditional way of life involves the reservation of land for the Orang Asli. Legislation of such matters concerning the Orang Asli is the National Land Code 1965, Land Conservation Act 1960, Protection of Wildlife Act 1972, National Parks Act 1980, and most importantly the Aboriginal Peoples Act 1954.

=== Eviction without compensation ===
The Aboriginal Peoples Act 1954, which provides for the setting up and establishment of the Orang Asli Reserve Land, also includes the power according to the Director-General of the JHEOA to order Orang Asli out of such reserved land at its discretion, and award compensation to affected people, also at its discretion. The state government may also revoke the reserve status of these lands at any time, and the Orang Asli will have to relocate, and even in the event of such relocation, the state government is not obliged to pay any compensation or allocate an alternative site to the affected Orang Asli victims. A landmark case on this matter is in the 2002 case of Sagong bin Tasi & Ors v Kerajaan Negeri Selangor. The case was concerned with the state government using its powers conferred under the 1954 Act to evict Orang Asli from gazetted Orang Asli Reserve Land. The High Court ruled in favour of Sagong Tasi, who represented the Orang Asli, and this decision was upheld by the Court of Appeal. Nevertheless, customary land disputes between Orang Asli and the state government still occurs from time to time. In 2016, the Kelantan state government was sued due to a dispute over land by Orang Asli.

=== Excessive state control ===
The department has broad powers, including controlling the entry of outsiders into the areas of Orang Asli settlements, the appointment and dismissal of village heads (batins), the ban on planting any specific plants on Orang Asli lands, the issuance of permits for deforestation, jungle harvesting produce, hunting in traditional areas of Orang Asli, as well as determining the conditions under which Orang Asli can be hired. When appointing village elders, JAKOA focuses primarily on the candidate's knowledge of the Malay language and his ability to follow instructions. The final decision in all matters concerning the Orang Asli are decided by the authorized state official, the General Director of JAKOA. The department is the de facto "landowner" of the Orang Asli territories, it also shapes the general decisions of the communities, and essentially effectively keeps the Orang Asli in the status of its "children", acting as their state guardian infantilising them in ways not applied to the Malays or natives in Sabah and Sarawak.

=== Unrecognised as people ===
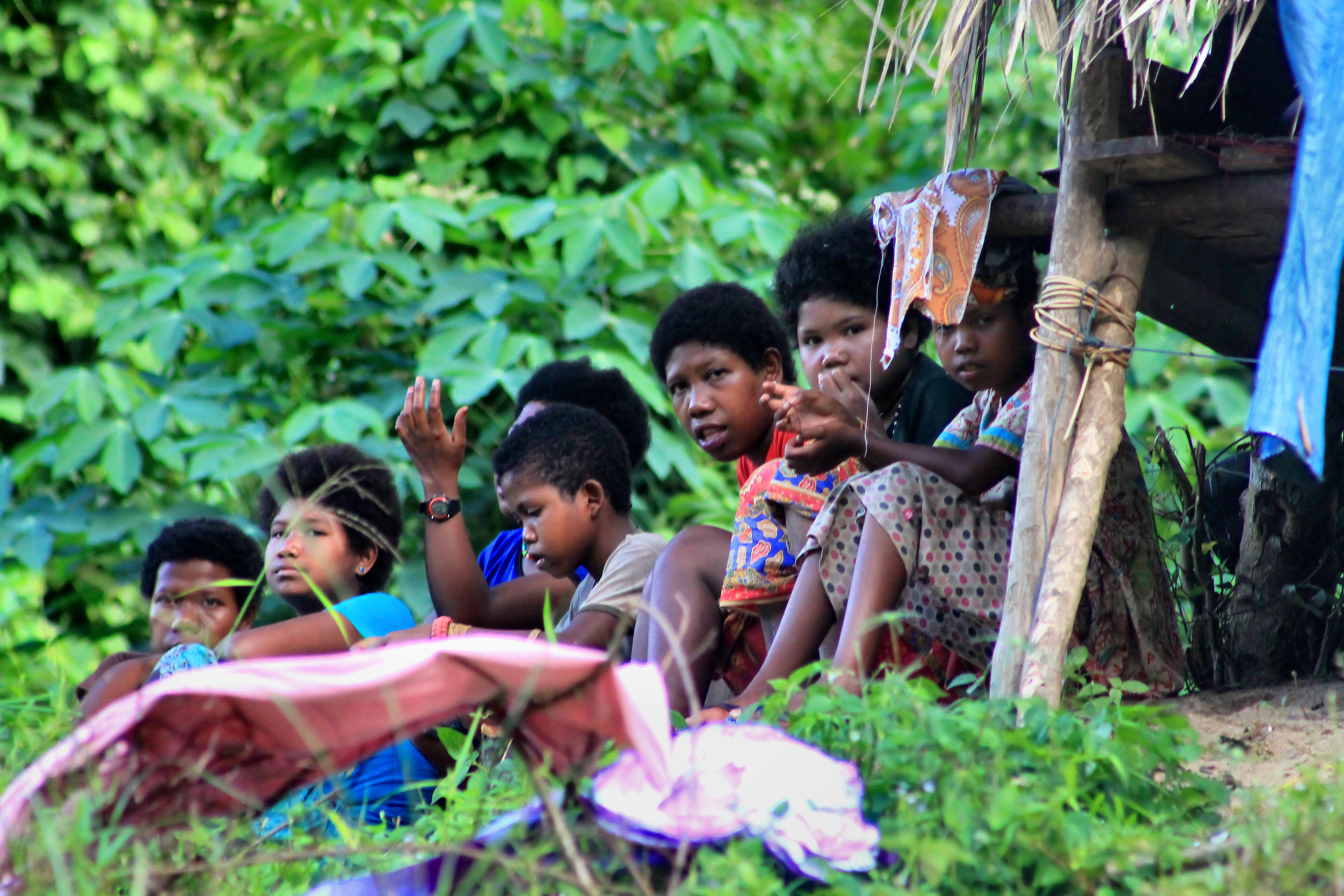
A Batek family in Kuala Tahan, Pahang

While Malays have been considered a "native people" in Malaysia since colonial times, the Orang Asli, according to local notions, are communities of "primitive" people who never formed an "effective statehood" and were dependent on the Malay state with political status determined by the practice of Islam, knowledge of the Malay language, and compliance with the norms of Malay society preferring that the Orang Asli "masuk Melayu" which is "to become a Malay." The Malaysian state government does not recognise the Orang Asli as a "people" at all in the sense as defined in United Nations documents. The Orang Asli's "nativeness" is their attempt to defend a broader political autonomy. Recently, some Orang Asli groups, with the support of volunteer lawyers, have made some progress in asserting their constitutional rights to customary lands and resources in the courts. They demanded compensation in accordance with the principles of common law and the international rights of indigenous peoples.

=== Discriminatory and lower-Bumiputra status ===
In the early 1970s, the government began to introduce New Economic Policy (NEP), as part of which created a new class of people "bumiputera", "sons of the soil". The Orang Asli are classified as bumiputeras, a status signifying indigeneity to Malaysia which carries certain social, economic, and political rights, along with the Malays and the natives of Sabah and Sarawak. Based on their initial presence on this land, the bumiputera received economic and political advantages over other non-native groups. In addition to special economic "rights", the bumiputera enjoy the support of the state government in terms of the development of their religion, culture, language, preferences in the field of education, and in holding positions in government and government agencies. However, this status is generally not mentioned in the constitution. In reality, bumiputera as a form of Malay supremacy policy is used as a political means for the furtherance of the political dominance of the Malay community in the country. The indigenous people of East Malaysia Borneo and Peninsular Malaysia are practically perceived as "lower bumiputera" pribumis, and as for the Orang Asli in particular, the Federal Constitution does not even mention them under the label "bumiputera". The status of a bumiputera has little or no benefit to most Orang Asli. They continue to be a dependent (ward) category of the population.

the Orang Melayu or Malays have always been the definitive people of the Malay Peninsula. The aborigines were never accorded any such recognition nor did they claim such recognition. There was no known aborigine government or state. Above all, at no time did they outnumber the Malays. It is quite obvious that if today there were four million aborigines, the right of the Malays to regard the Malay Peninsula as their own country will be questioned by the world. But in fact, there are no more than a few thousand aborigines.

— Mahathir Mohamad, Malaysia's fourth and seventh Prime Minister (1981) The Malay Dilemma, pp. 126–127

Malaysia's fourth and seventh prime minister, Mahathir Mohamad, made controversial remarks regarding the Orang Asli, saying that Orang Asli were not entitled more rights than Malays even though they were natives to the land, as posted on his blog comparing the Orang Asli in Malaysia to Native Americans in the United States, Māori in New Zealand, and Aboriginal Australians. He was criticised by spokespeople and advocates for the Orang Asli who said that the Orang Asli desired to be recognised as the true natives of Malaysia and that his statement would expose their land to businessmen and loggers.

=== Lack of representation in state bodies ===
Orang Asli have equal voting rights with other citizens of the country, participate in national and state elections. In addition, in order to involve them in the legislative process in parliament, since 1957, five senators from among the Orang Asli have been appointed. However, the Orang Asli have no real representation in state bodies. The situation is complicated by the fact that the organisation or person who has the right to represent the interests of a particular indigenous community is determined by the state government. Therefore, in their activities, such representatives do not reflect the thoughts, needs and aspirations of their community, and moreover, are they are not accountable to it. A clear example of the current situation is the case when in June 2001 one of the Orang Asli senators raised in the Malaysian Dewan Negara Senate the question of the inexpediency of spending funds that the state government directed to the introduction of the Semai language in school.

== Modernisation ==
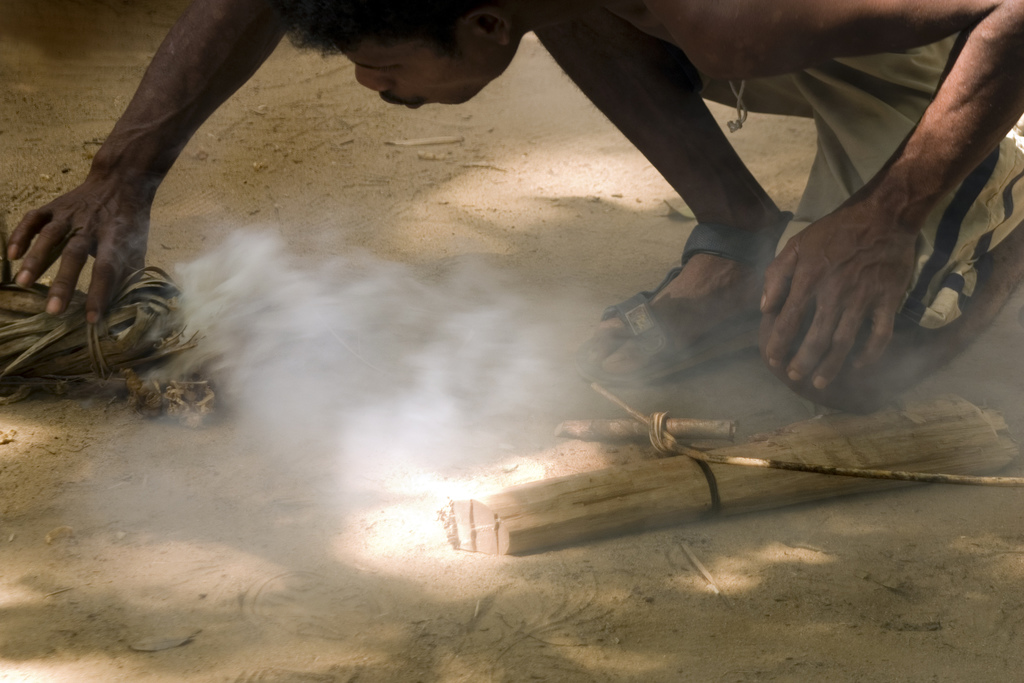
An Orang Asli in Taman Negara starting a fire using traditional method

Since independence in 1957, the Malaysian government has begun to develop comprehensive Orang Asli community development programmes. The first stage, designed for the period 1954–1978, focused on security aspects and aimed to protect the Orang Asli from the influence of the communists. In the second phase, which began in the late 1970s, the government began to focus on the socio-economic development of the Orang Asli communities.

In 1980, the state began creating Orang Asli settlements under the so-called Rancangan Pengumpulan Semula (RPS), a "regrouping scheme". There were established 17 RPS with 6 in the state of Perak, 7 in the state of Pahang, 3 in the state of Kelantan and 1 in the state of Johor; totaling of 3,015 families that lived in them. The RPS scheme targeted remote and scattered settlements and was to organise Orang Asli agricultural activities as their main source of livelihood. Programmes for the introduction of commercial crops, such as rubber trees, oil palm, coconut palm, and fruit trees, were implemented. These programmes were implemented mainly by two government agencies, namely the Rubber Industry Smallholders Development Authority (RISDA) and the Federal Land Consolidation and Rehabilitation Authority (FELCRA Berhad). Each family received up to ten acres of land as part of large plantations and two more acres for housing and homesteading. JHEOA provided people with tools, seedlings, herbicides and fertilisers for farming.

Eventually, the RPS became a model for modernising the Orang Asli economy. In 1999 a restructuring of village project called Penyusunan Semula Kampung (PSK) was approved and implemented, which provides for the modernisation of basic infrastructure and public services in existing Orang Asli villages, whose residents began to receive the same incentives and benefits as the RPS participants. As of 2004, the project covered 217 Orang Asli villages. 545 Orang Asli villages (63%) were supplied with electricity, and 619 villages (71%) received water supply. A 2,910 km of rural roads was also built, and they provide access to 631 (73%) Orang Asli villages.

Recently, economic development has spread to inland areas. A special programme Program Bersepadu Daerah Terpencil (PROSDET) is focused on the development of settlements located in remote areas and inaccessible to any type of vehicle. A pilot project under this scheme is being implemented in the village of Pantos, located in the Kuala Lipis region, Pahang. The programme covers 200 families.

The Malaysian government seeks to eradicate poverty among its citizens, including the Orang Asli community. In order for them to compete in the labour market, the government considers it important to teach the Orang Asli the skills needed to do so. As part of its economic development programmes, JAKOA opens training courses in crop and livestock care, entrepreneurship courses, material assistance and equipment for indigenous people to start their own businesses such as grocery stores, restaurants, mechanic shops, Internet cafes, construction companies, fishing, potato, lime, aquaculture of tilapia, poultry, goats, and so forth, with funds allocated for the construction of premises for business space, where Orang Asli entrepreneurs could operate and sell their products. JAKOA organises trainings and develops training programmes for Orang Asli under the Training and Employment Programme known as Program Latihan Kemahiran & Kerjaya (PLKK). In addition, Orang Asli community members are allowed to invest in shares in Amanah Saham Bumiputera, a fund management company owned by the government, reserved for the bumiputeras only.

== Socio-economic situation ==
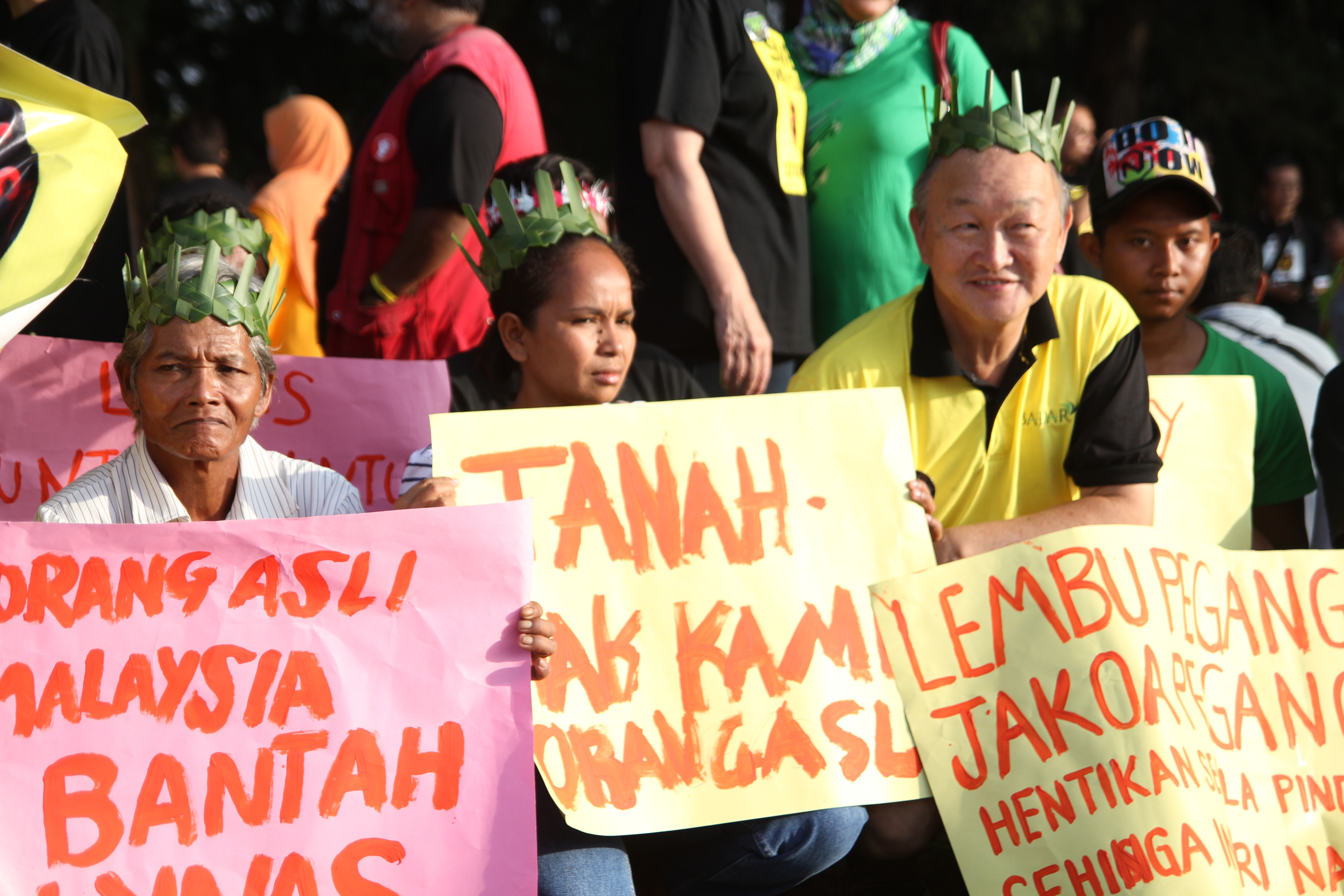
Malaysians, including Orang Asli, protesting against the Australian rare-earths mining company Lynas from operating in Malaysia

Jabatan Hal Ehwal Orang Asli (Department of Orang Asli Affairs, JHEOA), a government agency that was first set up in 1954 is entrusted to oversee the affairs of the Orang Asli under the Malaysian Ministry of Rural Development. Among its stated objectives are to eradicate poverty among the Orang Asli, improving their health, promoting education, and improving their general livelihood. There is a high incidence of poverty among the Orang Asli who belong to the poorest group of the Malaysian population. In 1997, 80% of all Orang Asli lived below the poverty line; extremely high compared to the national poverty rate of 8.5%. 50.9% of households, according to the United Nations Development Programme in 2007 lived in poverty, and 15.4% hardcore poverty living below the poverty line. These figures contrast sharply with the national figures of 7.5% and 1.4%, respectively. In 2010, according to the Department of Statistics Malaysia, 76.9% of the Orang Asli population remained below the poverty line, with 35.2% classified as living in hard-core poverty, compared to 1.4% nationally.

Other indicators also indicate a low quality of life in the Orang Asli. This is indicated, in particular, by the lack of basic amenities in many families such as plumbing, toilet, and often electricity. Thus, in 1997, according to the Department of Statistics of Malaysia, only 47.5% of Orang Asli households had some form of water supply, both indoors and outdoors, with 3.9% dependent only on other water sources such as rivers, streams and wells to meet their water needs. Toilets, as a basic convenience, were lacking in 43.7% of Orang Asli housing units, while for Peninsular Malaysia in general this figure was only three percent. 51.8% of Orang Asli households used kerosene lamps to light their homes.

Another indicator of low wealth is the lack of basic household items in many Orang Asli families; including refrigerators, radios, televisions, bicycles, motorcycles, cars, and so on, which may reflect the state of their well-being. According to the same Department of Statistics, in 1997 almost a quarter (22.2%) of all Orang Asli households did not have any of these household items. Only 35% of Orang Asli households in rural areas had motorcycles, which is an important mode of transportation.

The government sees the causes of poverty in the Orang Asli communities includes excessive dependence on jungle foraging, living in remote and inaccessible areas, low self-esteem and isolation from other communities, low level of education, low or no savings, lack of modern skills for employment, land encroachment and lack of land ownership, and excessive dependence on state aid.

Customary lands and resources have been the only source of livelihood for the Orang Asli for centuries. Most Orang Asli still maintains a close physical, cultural, and spiritual connection with the environment in traditional areas. Relocation to other areas as part of development programmes deprives them of this connection and forces them to adapt to new living conditions. The appropriation of traditional Orang Asli lands by the state and private individuals and companies, deforestation, the creation of rubber and oil palm plantations, and the development of tourism are destroying the foundations of the traditional indigenous economy. This forces many of these people to move to a sedentary lifestyle in villages or urban areas. The loss of customary lands becomes a trap for them, leading them into poverty.

During the years of independence in Malaysia, there has been a marked improvement in the provision of medical care for the Orang Asli and the availability of treatment and prevention facilities for them. However, there are still many problems. Health standards among Orang Asli communities remain low compared to other communities. More than others, they are exposed to various infectious diseases, such as tuberculosis, malaria, typhoid fever and more. The problem of malnutrition is also urgent among Orang Asli, particularly among children. Access to information on the health status of residents of remote settlements and the availability of medical facilities there is generally limited.

Due to the lack of proper education, Orang Asli cannot be competitive in society at large leading them into dependence upon JAKOA.

Under the 1954 Aboriginal Peoples Act, the Malaysian government can "degazette" the land of the Orang Asli at any time, which has no obligation to give fair compensation. In 2013 the Malaysian state attempted to weaken this legislation, which would have cost the Orang Asli 645,000 hectares of their ancestral land. The Orang Asli are frequently targeted by the Malaysian state for conversion to Islam and assimilation by the bumiputra. In the state of Kelantan, Malay Muslim men were paid 10,000 ringgit, or about US$2,200 in 2022, to marry an Orang Asli woman.

== Notable Orang Asli ==
- Amani Williams Hunt Abdullah, Orang Asli politician and Orang Asli activist, born to an English father and a Semai mother.
- Ramli Mohd Nor, current member of Parliament for Cameron Highlands, born to a Semai father and a Temiar mother. He is the first indigenous Orang Asli candidate elected an MP into the Dewan Rakyat.
- Yosri Derma Raju, former Malaysian footballer.

== See also ==
- Aborigines Museum
- Department of Orang Asli Development
- Orang Laut
- Orang Asli Museum
- Semang
