= Jah Hut people =

Ethnic group of Malaysia

Jah Hut people Jahut / Jahet / Cheres
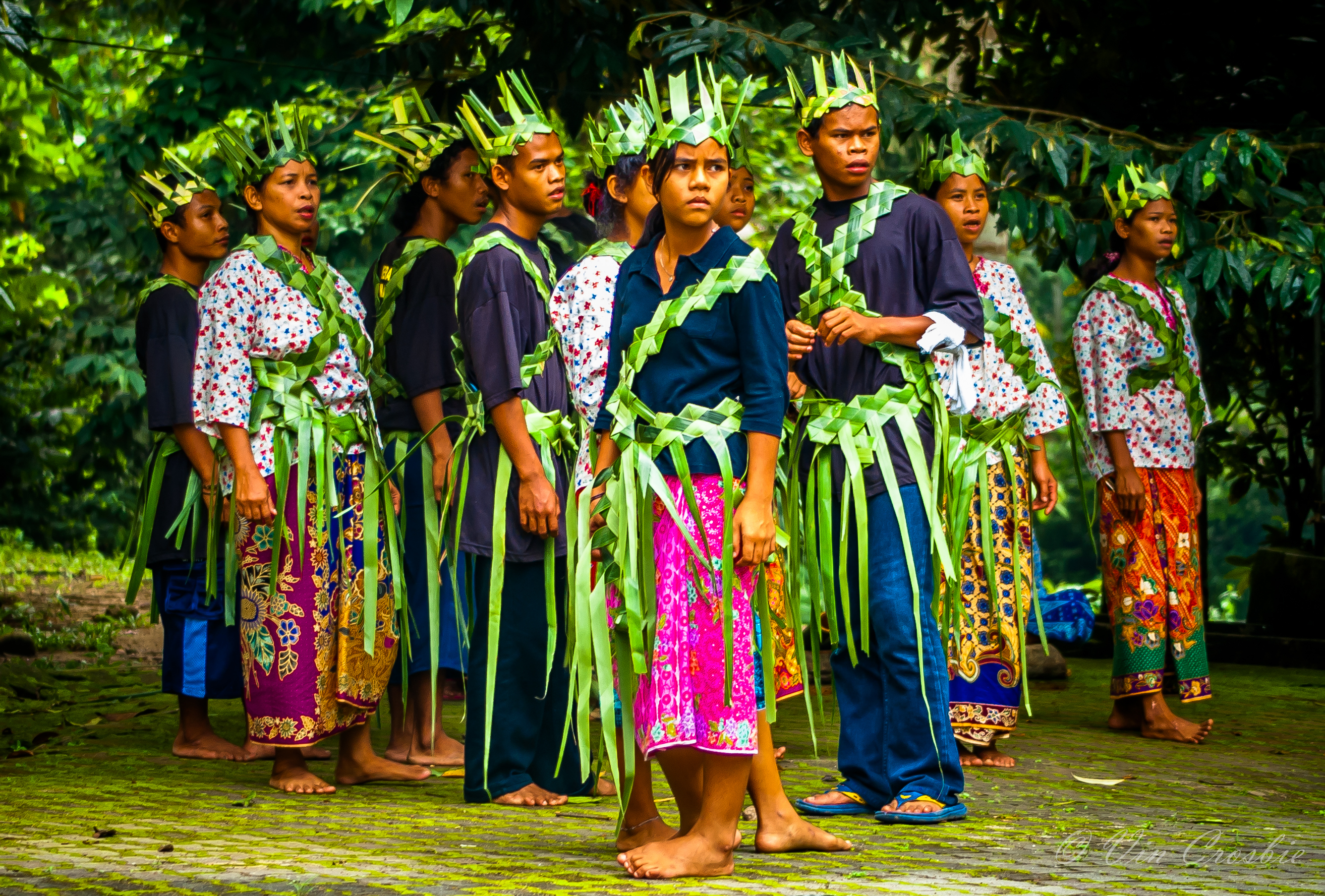
- Jah Hut performers in Selangor, Malaysia.

Total population
- 4,191 (2010)

Regions with significant populations
- Malaysia (Pahang)

Languages
- Jah Hut language, Malay language

Religion
- Animism (predominantly), Islam, Christianity

Related ethnic groups
- Semai people, Temiar people

Jah Hut people are one of the Orang Asli tribes living in Pahang, Malaysia. As of 2000, the population of the Jah Hut people are 2,442 and by 2005, it is estimated that there are approximately 4,000 people living in 11 kampungs (villages) that are located along the west bank of the Pahang River from the north in Jerantut to the south in Temerloh, Pahang.

These 11 kampungs also includes Kampung Pos Penderas and Kampung Keboi which are situated in the tropical jungles of Jerantut, Pahang. Kampung Keboi is one of the smallest kampungs among the Jah Hut settlements with only about 100 people. The Jah Hut people live in houses built on stilts, similar to Malay Houses.

== Population ==
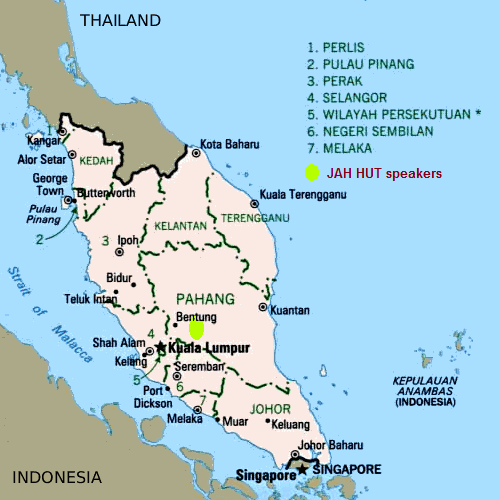
Location of Jah Hut language speakers as seen in the Peninsular Malaysia map.

The population dynamics of the Jah Hut people are as the following:-

Year	1960	1965	1969	1974	1980	1993	1996	2000	2003	2004	2010
Population	1,703	1,893	2,103	2,280	2,442	3,193	3,193	2,594	5,104	5,194	4,191

== Language ==
The language spoken by the Jah Hut people is known as Jah Hut language and it is recognized as part of the Mon-Khmer languages; of which is also a branch of the Austro-Asiatic languages. In the Jah Hut language, Jah means "people" and Hut means "not". Diffloth (1976) reports that in the neighboring Cheq Wong language, there is a practice to name ethnic groups after their respective word for "no". The Jah Hut, however, only apply this to the name for themselves. According to the Jah Hut people, Jah means "people" and Hut means "different". The Jah Hut language itself have absorbed a lot of words from the Malay language into its vocabulary. Among the Jah Hut dialects includes Kerdau, Krau, Ketiar Krau (Terengganu), Kuala Tembeling, Pulau Guai, Ulu Ceres (Cheres), and Ulu Tembeling.

== Economic activities ==
The main agricultural activities of the Jah Hut people are such as rubber tapping, rice cultivation, hunting, gathering and poultry. Wood carving activity is still being practiced and it is not only regarded as a source of income but also seen as a part of keeping their traditional faith alive. Although the Jah Hut people reside in the jungles, they are not entirely isolated to themselves but they have been trading with other nearby groups of people for hundreds of years.

== Wood Carvings ==
Out of the 13 groups within the Orang Asli, the Jah Hut is one of 2 groups that produce art, and the other is the Mah Meri. Masks and sculptures are the two types of art that these two groups are known for creating. Before this practice of wood sculpting, another form of sculpture existed, which consisted of a small-scale sculpture that was created for medical purposes and religious rituals. Palm leaves, extra wood, and clay were the main materials used for this art form. The art of wood carving among the Jah Hut is a newer development, originating in the 1950s, and occurred when the British came upon the community. The British introduced using wood to sculpt, as well as updating their tools to include chisels, knives, hammers, and drills.

Marking out shapes on a selected piece of wood is the first step taken in the process of creating a carving. Primarily two types of trees are used for their wood carvings: the Carapa moluccensis and the Alstonia spatulata. A mantra or prayer is recited before the carving starts to ensure that the carver's work is being done appropriately. This is an imperative step surrounding the religious and spiritual elements of the Jah Hut's art. To make it easier to work with, the wood is carved when wet. Paint can be used to enhance the masks or sculptures, but the carvers rely on the intricate designs, patterns, and form to give the pieces significance. Once the mask or sculpture is completed, the artwork is given a name.

Both masks and sculptures show the Jah Hut's belief in the supernatural. Masks are known as topeng and are used to tell stories, myths, and old legends. The purpose of the masks in the Jah Hut's oral tradition is to portray spirits and other characters.

Traditional masks are also used during ritual dances and have medicinal value. Some ways that the Jah Hut connect with the spirits is through dancing, songs, wooden carvings, and masks. Jah Hut do sell their art pieces for money, but judge good art outside of the pecuniary value. Jah Hut art is spiritual, full of artistic imagination, which helps each artist to create their own style, and is unhindered by its market value.

== Traditional medicine ==
Traditional herbal knowledge are passed down from one generation to another in a form of oral narrative by the bomoh (meaning, "witch doctor") that specializes in traditional medicine. The Indian Journal of Medical Sciences have documented at least 16 Jah Hut medicines. Among the medicines that have been verified by scientific researchers includes the Hedyotis capitellata, Melastoma malabathricum, Lycopodiella cernua, and the following:-

- Eurycoma longifolia: Used as an aphrodisiac to boost orgasm, this herb is a popular herb among many races in Malaysia and can be obtained from the market.
- Morinda citrifolia: The Jah Hut people use this herb to treat boils through the topical formation of its leaves and fruits. This coincides with the verification of pharmacology that ulcers are often caused by Staphylococcus aureus bacteria. Since Morinda citrifolia has antibacterial properties to combat it, this treatment is not an unfounded treatment.
- Vernonia cinerea: Used by Jah Hut people to relieve asthma, as recent research shows that Vernonia cinerea has anti-inflammatory properties and therefore, this treatment is effective.
- Vernonia arborea: Used for treating tumors.

Other medicines that have not been verified are such as:-

- Alstonia angustiloba and Homalanthus populneus: Jah Hut people use this herb to treat headaches.
- Physalis minima, Pyrrosia piloselloides and Smilax lanceifolia: These herbs are often used by the Jah Hut people to relieve pain.

In recent years, most of this people's medicines are no longer attractive to younger generation who relies more on western medicine. The current generation of Jah Hut people mostly do no longer recognize herbs and does not have much knowledge of traditional herbs.

At present, most of the younger generation had migrate to urban areas for education and employment. Therefore, only the older generation have the knowledge of herbs and it is estimated that only a few people are able to use traditional medicine to treat diseases.
