= Jah Hut language =

Austroasiatic language spoken in Malaysia

Jah Hut
- Native to: Peninsular Malaysia
- Ethnicity: Jah Hut people
- Native speakers: 4,191 (2010)
- Language family: Austroasiatic: Aslian; Jah Hut–North Aslian; Jah Hut
- Dialects: Kerdau, Krau, Ketiar Krau, Kuala Tembeling, Pulau Guai, Cheres, Ulu Tembeling

Language codes
- ISO 639-3: jah
- Glottolog: jahh1242
- ELP: Jah Hut
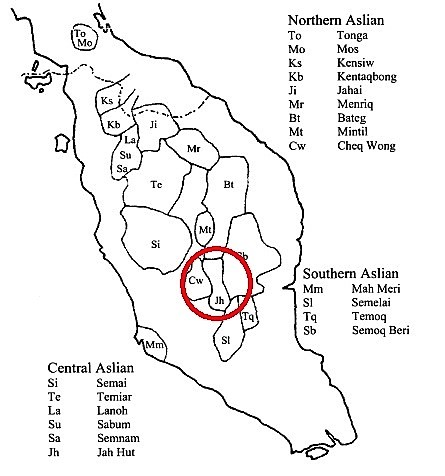
- Distribution of Jah Hut.

Jah Hut (Jah Het) is an Austroasiatic language spoken around the Krau river in peninsular Malaysia by the Jah Hut, one of the indigenous Orang Asli peoples.

== Classification ==
Jah Hut belongs to the Aslian branch of the Austroasiatic language family. Previously thought to be a member of the Central Aslian sub-branch, Jah Hut is now considered an isolate.

Dialects

- Kerdau
- Krau
- Ketiar Krau
- Kuala Tembeling
- Pulau Guai
- Cheres
- Ulu Tembeling

== Phonology ==
Jah Hut has 9 vowels and 19 consonants.

Vowels
	Front	Central	Back
Close	i	ʉ	u
Close-mid	e	ə	o
Open(-mid)	ɛ	a	ɔ

Consonants
		Bilabial	Alveolar	Palatal	Velar	Glottal
Nasal		m	n	ɲ	ŋ	
Stop	voiceless	p	t	c	k	ʔ
Stop	voiced	b	d	ɟ	g	ʔ
Fricative			s			h
Approximant			l	j	w	
Trill			r			

== Morphology ==
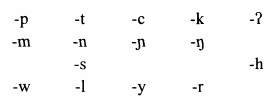
Word-final codas in Jah Hut

Jah Hut does not contain open major syllables in word-final positions. Conversely, the language contains 15 consonants that can be used to close a syllable. Further, in the context in which a nasalized vowel or consonant occurs earlier in a given word, the final stop is broken down into a nasal and glottal stop.

Does not contain restrictions on non-homorganic stop clusters, meaning that many words begin with consonants that don't phonetically match. (i.e. words that begin with ‘tk’ or ‘bk’). This pattern can be found in many other Aslian languages.

- tkak - palate
- dkan - Bamboo Rat
- bkul - gray

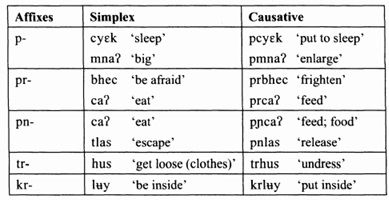
List of some of Jah Hut's causative prefixes.

Jah Hut varies from other Mon-Khmer languages in that it contains little-to-no phonetic vowel length. It also uses causative prefixes that are composed by p- or –r-. By using this, the speaker is able to indicate that a specific something or someone causes something or someone to be or do something else.

Similarly, the prefix -m allows the user of the language to assign an act to a person. For example, lyep, in Jah Hut, means "to plait palm leaves", while mlayep is translated as, "one who plaits". On the other hand, when an act does not involve a person directly, the agent of the act can be found in a prefixed or infixed -n, depending on the root of the given word. i.e. bilit, or wrapping, compared to bnilit, meaning the act of wrapping.

== Syntax ==
In Jah Hut, all complements but the direct object require a preposition and, like many Aslian languages, verb usage in Jah Hut is restricted generally to strings of no more than 2 verbs, with the first verb referencing some form of motion, with the second verb representing the major action. Another form of verb usage is a form which uses the first verb as the major action, with the second verb describing the manner in which the verb is enacted. Also, if a verb is attached to a personal prefix, this must always agree with the agent of the sentence, regardless of where these two components of the sentence are located.
