= Temuan people =

Ethnic group of Peninsular Malaysia

Temuan people Uwang Temuan / Eang Temuan / Orang Temuan
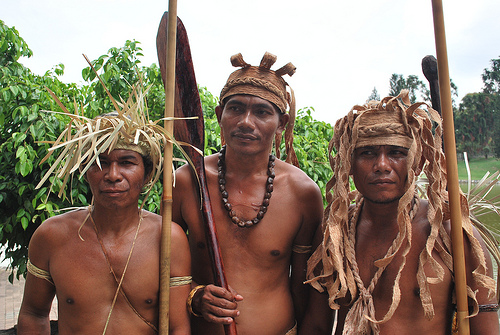
- Temuan people in traditional clothing.

Total population
- 19,343 (2010)

Regions with significant populations
- Malaysia (Pahang, Selangor, Negeri Sembilan, Malacca, Johor)

Languages
- Temuan language, Malay language, Malaysian English

Religion
- Ancestral worship (predominantly) and a significant population practice Christianity or Islam

Related ethnic groups
- Semelai people, Malays

The Temuan people (Temuan: Uwang/Eang Temuan, Malaysian: Orang Temuan) are a Proto-Malay ethnic group indigenous to western parts of Peninsular Malaysia. They can be found in the states of Selangor, Pahang, Johor, Negeri Sembilan and Malacca. The Temuans are classified as part of Orang Asli group according to the Malaysian government. They are also one of the largest (only smaller in population in comparison to the Semai people and Jakun people) and the most widespread of the Orang Asli ethnic groups.

Outwardly, the Temuan people; like the other Proto-Malays, are virtually indistinguishable from the Malays themselves. They have straight hair and light brown skin, but strong individual variations are found among the Temuan people. Their average height is approximately 153 cm for men and 142 cm for women. Culturally, the Malays and the Proto-Malays are also closely related.

They speak Temuan, an Austronesian language closely related to Malay.

== Demographics ==
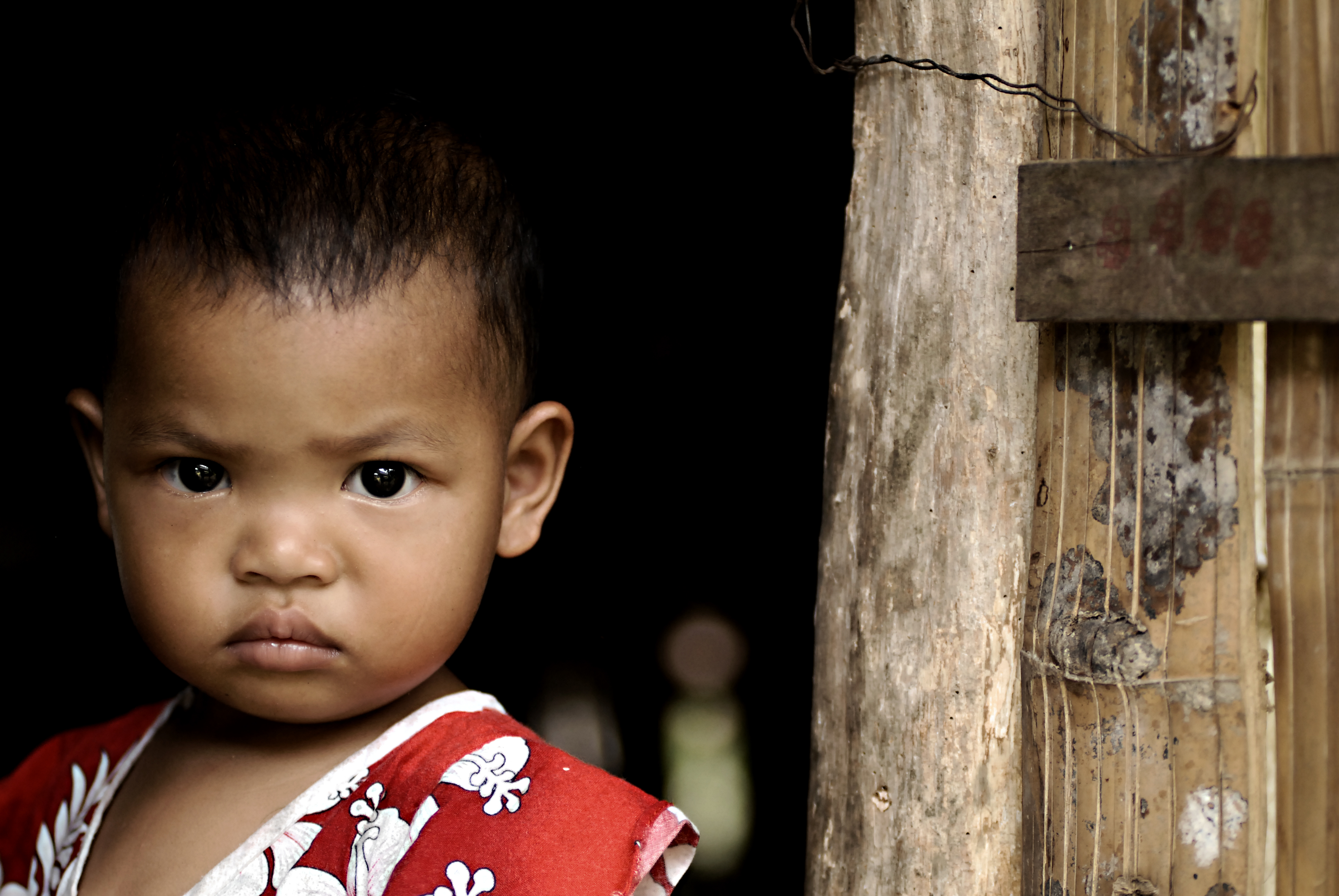
A Temuan child.

The Temuan people can be found in almost every state of Peninsular Malaysia, but most of them still live in the countryside and suburban villages of Selangor, Negeri Sembilan, as well as Pahang and Melaka. Usually these villages consist of purely Temuan people. Traditionally, the Temuans were forest dwellers. However, with the implementation economic development programmes, relocation of individuals of Orang Asli communities to new villages are often in suburban areas by the government. In urban areas, the Temuan people live alongside other ethnic groups.

The dynamics in the population of the Temuan people in Malaysia:-

| Year | 1960 | 1965 | 1969 | 1974 | 1980 | 1991 | 1993 | 1996 | 2000 | 2003 | 2004 | 2008 | 2010 |
| Population | 5,241 | 7,221 | 8,631 | 8,698 | 9,449 | 15,057 | 16,020 | 16,020 | 18,560 | 22,162 | 21,512 | 22,700 | 19,343 |

Population distribution of the Temuan people by state (1996, JHEOA census):-

| State | Temuan | Total of Orang Asli | Percentage of Temuan |
|---|---|---|---|
| Selangor | 7,107 | 10,472 | 67.9% |
| Negeri Sembilan | 4,691 | 6,188 | 75.8% |
| Pahang | 2,741 | 33,741 | 8.1% |
| Melaka | 818 | 831 | 98.4% |
| Johor | 663 | 7,379 | 9.0% |
| Total | 16,020 | 92,529 | 18.0% |

Despite the government's efforts to modernize the indigenous way of living, the Orang Asli are still a marginalized people of the country's population. Literacy rates among the indigenous stood at 43% in 1991, compared with 86% nationally at that time. The average life expectancy of an Orang Asli person is 53 years, and the poverty rate was 76.9%, with 35.2% is considered very poor ("hardcore poor").

== Language ==
The Temuans speak the Malay language as well as their own language called the Temuan language or Bahasak Temuan. It is distinct but closely related to the Malay language spoken by their Malay neighbours. The Temuan language belongs to the Malay group of the Malayo-Polynesian languages and is very close to standard Malay language. It is often considered as one of the Malay dialects. Interestingly, the Temuan language is closer to standard Malay than the dialect of the Minangkabau language, a colloquial language of the Malay people in Negeri Sembilan, who settled alongside the Temuan people.

It is essentially a spoken language with several dialectal variation. Temuan is divided into two major dialects namely Belandas and Mantra which differs mostly in terms of phonology and also some of the vocabulary but still mutually intelligible to one another. Example of Temuan Belandas dialect: diak (he/she), hajak (only), kitak (we), tai (the end of sentence particle). Example of Temuan Mantra dialect: dien (he/she), hajen (only), kiten (we), tea (the end of sentence particle).

Traditionally, the Temuan people do not have their own written language. Temuan is mostly written in the Latin alphabet although no standard orthography has been made. Asyik FM, Malaysia's national radio broadcasts daily in the Temuan language. The medium of education of the Temuans is conducted in Malay.

== History ==
It is believed that the Proto-Malays arrived on the Malay Peninsula by sea in about 2,000 BC. By the 5th century AD, the Orang Asli were already suppliers of jungle products in international trade networks.

The popular folk history of the Temuan people with many variations tells of two brothers who participated in the gathering of earthly tribes in "times of grace, when men understood the language of animals." On the way home, a storm broke and overturned their ship. Abang (older brother) managed to grab his blowgun before the ship sank in the stormy waves, and swam ashore. Adik (the younger brother) managed to save only the sacred scroll, but that was enough to take precedence over Abang. Abang remained hunter-gatherers and Adik, with newly acquired knowledge, could institutionalized religion and write new laws for people to live by.

In the 11th century, the territory of the Malay Peninsula came under the rule of the Malay Kingdom of Srivijaya with its center in Palembang (South Sumatra). After the defeat of Srivijaya by the Javanese Majapahit in the 13th century, the latter took power over the peninsula. At the end of the 14th century, the Malays who came from Sumatra, established trading settlements on the coast. Among them was the Malacca Sultanate kingdom, which soon became the leading state in the region. After the capture of Malacca by the Portuguese Empire, the Malay rulers moved to Johor. A key moment in the history of the peninsula was the adoption of Islam by the Sultan of Malacca in the early 15th century.

During the time of the emergence of the Malays, the Temuan community lived in the modern state of Negeri Sembilan and its neighbouring areas. The basis of their economic activity was the cultivation of irrigated rice. Local peasants used sophisticated field irrigation techniques. The land belonged to the local communities that was led by a batin, the village head. At same time, the Temuan people already had their own political structures or proto-state formations. The Malays refer to the natives as Jakuns, Biduanda, Mantras, Orang Bukit or Sakais.

Eventually, the Malay population spread gradually to the interior. In Negeri Sembilan, these migrants consisted mainly of the Minangkabau people from West Sumatra. Colonizing new lands, they form agreements with the local batins. Through the means of mixed marriages, the Minangkabau gained the right to inherit power. On the Negeri Sembilan territory, Minangkabau principalities emerge as the ruling dynasties of which derived their roots from the local batins. The ancient history of the region is preserved in oral traditions, which were passed down from generation to generation. The people of Negeri Sembilan knew that they first under the subjugation of the Majapahit rulers, followed by the Sultan of Malacca, and its successive, the Johor Sultanate.

There was an active integration of Minangkabau migrants and local residents such as Jakun, Temuan into a single ethnic group (Biduanda), now known as the Malays of Negeri Sembilan. By adopting Islam, the Temuans became Malays. But not all indigenous people have embraced the new religion. Groups that decided to remain pagans were forced to retreat to the mountainous jungle areas and change their way of living. They began to live by hunting and gathering jungle products, and cultivating fallow farmland. These indigenous groups became the minority that rejected assimilation.

During the British Malaya colonial period, the Bedouin Muslims were already considered Malays, and indigenous groups of Temuan people began to be counted among the aborigines (obsolete official name for Orang Asli). The aborigines were defined as primitive people in need of paternalistic care. Orang Asli was noticed only during the Malayan Emergency (1948-1960), when it turned out that most of them supported the communist insurgents, consisting of mostly ethnic Chinese. The Chinese had close contacts with the aborigines, in particular, among the Temuan people as there were many people of mixed Sino-Temuan blood. In order to remove the Orang Asli from the influence of the Communists, the government resorted to relocating indigenous communities to the territories it controlled. The result of this invasive action was the death of about a third of the displaced due to unsanitary living conditions and psychological stress. Realizing their mistakes, the government changed its methods. The Orang Asli were then placed under total control, and their villages were turned into forts under the protection of soldiers, which were also provided with shops and medical facilities. It was the special Department of Aboriginal Affairs' responsibility to look after the communities of indigenous people. Among the aborigines were formed the Senoi Praaq, a paramilitary unit to fight the Communists. Temuan people were also included into the unit.

After the declaration of Independence of Malaysia and the Malayan Emergency, the Department of Aboriginal Affairs was renamed to Department of Orang Asli (Jabatan Orang Asli in Malay, JOA) and at present, the Department of Orang Asli Development (Jabatan Kemajuan Orang Asli in Malay, JAKOA). This department is authorized to resolve all issues in the Orang Asli communities, depriving them of any autonomy.

Malaysia's rapid economic development, which began in the 1970s, required land and natural resources. The government, often with the participation of JHEOA, has increasingly encroached on Orang Asli lands, frequently ignoring their rights, which are not always legislated. Invasion by individuals, corporations and the government into areas inhabited by the Orang Asli became more frequent since the mid-1980s and gained widespread in the 1990s. These processes have mostly affected the Temuan people, whose traditional lands are located in the heart of Peninsular Malaysia, near the capital. Communities in the development zone were relocated to other areas. Some villages, such as in Bukit Lanjan, were relocated several times. In the new places, the government provided the natives with housing, land, basic infrastructure, collective ownership of plantation were given, as well as compensation for the loss of traditional land were paid. Conflict situations often occurred. Sometimes Temuan communities took legal action for the violation their rights. In 2002, the Supreme Court ordered the Selangor state government to pay compensation to the Temuan community of Kampung Bukit Tampoi through the loss of their customary land, which was part of a highway construction.

== Economy ==
The main occupations of the Temuan people are agriculture and forestry. The main food crop is rice. Three varieties of wet rice are grown (masuri, pulut and malinja), the whole crop is used for own consumption. However, buying rice from stores are still necessary as many families do not get sufficient rice from their fields. Rubber and other commodity crops are also grown. Most Orang Asli have collectively owned rubber, palm oil or cocoa plantations. The sale of rubber provides most of the cash income for these people. They also sell some jungle produce (durian, petai, rattan, bamboo), which are harvested from the jungle. In addition to rice, they also buy tobacco, clothes and other luxury items.

The main economic aggregate of the Temuan people is similar to the Malays. To some extent, these neighboring communities are competitors, and for this reason hostility do exists between them. In the past, there were fights and acts of violence between them. Despite this situation, the Temuans do trade with the Malays.

In addition to the main farm, the Temuan people keep gardens in their backyards where they grow a variety of vegetables and tropical fruits. Temuan villages are usually located near the jungle. Collecting jungle produce provides income for the Temuans and is also an additional source of food. In addition to wild fruits, medicinal plants are harvested, as well as wood for construction. Wild boars, deer, monkeys, monitor lizards, porcupines and other animals and birds are also hunted in the jungle. They also fish in the surrounding rivers.

Some Temuans, mostly of the younger generations, are employed in the neighbouring cities. In the Desa Temuan settlement; located on the outskirts of Petaling Jaya, residents rent out their homes to foreign workers. There are educated people among the Orang Asli who work in the public sector, but most of them still maintain a traditional way of thinking and lifestyle.

== Society ==
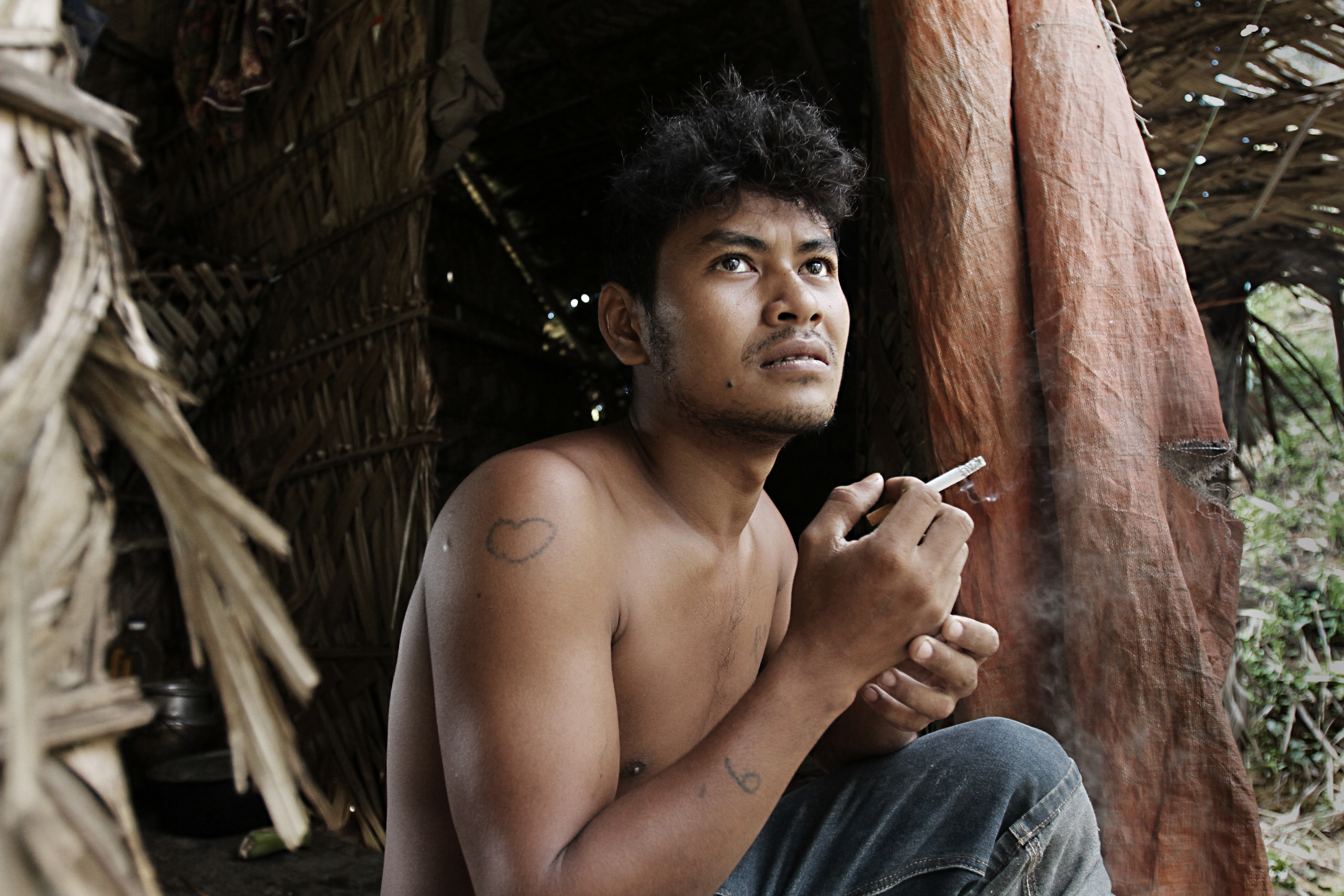
A Temuan man at Johol, Negeri Sembilan.

Temuans people live in autonomous rural communities consisting of nuclear families numbering from 50 to 500 people.

Temuan communities have a complex hierarchy. They are headed by a batin (village head); the most respected person in the community, regarded as a man with a strong personality with extensive knowledge and experience, honest and fair. He is the highest adviser, the last resort. The Batin is also credited with supernatural powers, and people seek him not only for advice, but also for magical remedies against minor ailments. Peasants would have to give the batin a small portion of their rice harvest, as well as a large game animal. The position of the batin is usually inherited by his eldest son, but if he does not have the traits of a leader, someone else can be chosen to replace him.

The assistant of the batin in governing is his deputy, the pemangku (deputy village head; his duty is dividing animal game obtained from hunting), the second deputy jenang and his assistant jekara; the latter two organize and control collective work. Pengulu balai (head of the hall) organizes joint holidays and celebrations. There are also several panglimas in the Temuan communities, consisting of former military leaders who led groups of soldiers to protect a certain area of the village.

The basic social unit of the Temuan society are generally a nuclear family or conjugal family units. Usually most families in one village are connected by family and affinal (connected through marriage) ties. The houses of close relatives are nearby. The nuclear family is also the main economic unit in a Temuan society. Each family has its own rubber plantation, rice field and orchard. Children help their parents in everything.

The tracing of kinship are conducted on both paternal and maternal lineage. Polygamy is not prohibited, but it is very rare. The marriage of the Temuans is mostly exogenous, the menteri helps to expand the boundaries of the search for spouse, through the close connection between several villages, which is common for Temuan communities. Although Temuans live in close contact with Malays, Chinese and Indians, mixed marriages are almost non-existent.

Despite significant changes in their lives, the Temuan people continue to look at the world through the eyes of jungle dwellers. It is difficult for them adapt to city life. Even after the resettlement in the city, they retain their own tribal structure by following the traditional way of life. The Temuan people have an ambiguous perception of the socio-cultural and economic changes that are taking place. Although people are generally satisfied with modern living conditions, they are also dissatisfied with the loss of their traditional culture.

The younger generation prefers a modern lifestyle. Many young Orang Asli, especially the Temuan, are drawn to Bonggeng culture, where, at weddings, young people are offered free food and they stay up all night with modern music.

The resettlement program has accelerated the process of modernization of the Temuan people in terms of electricity, public transport, modern health care, but at the same time in the new environment, the Temuan people are becoming a marginalized stratum of society. Due to lack of qualifications, they face difficulties in obtaining a good and stable job. They do not save money as they are reckless spender. Alcoholism has also become a serious problem, and the lack of money provokes people to steal. Other serious social problems also includes gambling and illegal racing.

== Religion ==
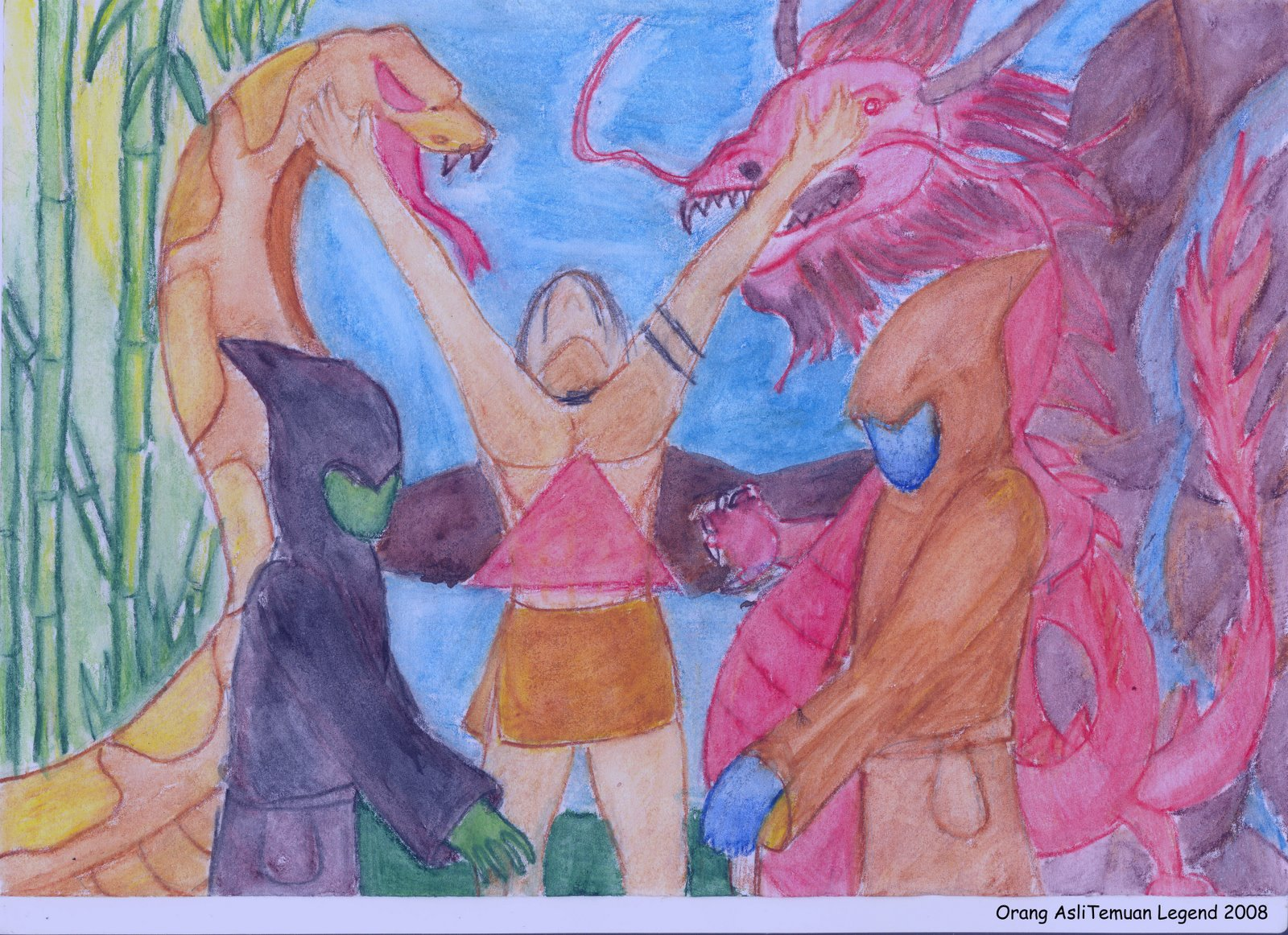
The Temuan people believe that every place, river, and ocean in this world has its guardian.

The majority of Temuans (64.2%) follow traditional beliefs, 30% Muslims, 5.8% Christians. Traditional religion (adat pepati) is part of their culture.

A basic traditional Temuan belief is that their God and ancestors are always present with them, guarding their safety. The belief in the existence of a higher god, are referred to as Tuhan by the Temuan people. The Temuans believe they were placed on the earth (Tanah Tujuh) by Muyang (God) to be guardians of the rain forest and that if they fail in their sacred duty, the whole world will turn upside down and humanity will perish.

The Temuans also believe that the whole world is inhabited by ghosts and spirits of hantu and jinn. Each of these supernatural beings has its own territories and is endowed with certain qualities. Each river, hill, stream, rock, tree and shrub is animated by a guardian spirit. Rivers are guarded by dragons (naga) and snakes (ular) which often cause mayhem if their homes are desecrated. Therefore, the Temuan people treated all these objects with great respect. The most revered of these is Mount Gunung Rajah ("Ruler's Mountain"), sacred to the Temuans, located on the border of Selangor and Pahang. An ancient Temuan legend says that it was on this mountain that their ancestors hid during the Great Flood, which destroyed the rest of humanity.

The Temuan's culture reflects their belief in these nature spirits. Their animism takes the form of taboos, herbal remedies, ritual ceremonies and magic. They have dukun (folk healers) and a village bomoh (shaman) who, when in a trance state, communicates with the nature spirits. It is the shaman who leads the tribe in the annual sawai or sewang - an ancient earth healing ritual to honour their ancestors and appease the guardian spirits. In an event of diseases and natural disasters; which according to the Temuans, are caused by the activities of evil spirits, Temuan people will also seek a dukun or bomoh to cure the disease. The folk healer gives the patient a herbal medicine, and in a trance performs special rites to reverse the effects of spirits. Temuans distinguish their shamans by strength. Traditional healers also provide services to outsiders, but for money.

There are also various taboos associated with ghosts and demons in Temuan beliefs. Loyok, an evil bird that flies in the evening, causes illness and death. So people should remain indoors at this time and not go outside. Another bird, Kelong Kuat functions as a messenger from the realm of the dead. When people hear the sound of this bird, they know that someone has died. Temuans cannot kill a person, otherwise the ghost of the murdered will pursue the killer. Every night the Temuans light a fire in the courtyard to ward off evil spirits and ghosts; a practice they continue to adhere even in the city. During lunch or dinner, people throw some food to evil spirits in open doors or windows to keep them from joining their table. Due to the threat from spirits and ghosts, all food bought or brought from outside must also be burned in the evening.

Every year, under the guidance of a shaman, the Temuans hold the sawai festival, an ancient ritual of healing the earth, in which they honor their ancestors and try to calm the guardian spirits.

At the end of every year, the Temuans celebrate the biggest holiday in the Temuan community, the Aik Gayak Muyang (Ancestor Day). It takes place in late December to early January, after harvest and fruit picking. Each village has its own date of the holiday. People gather for a feast to thank their God and ancestors for the crops they grow and for the peaceful life they have had.

In the 1970s, Malaysia began a policy of converting the Orang Asli to Islam. First sluggish, but it intensified in the 1980s, and in the 1990s the programs of Islamization (dakwah) began where specially trained Muslim missionaries operate in indigenous communities, and in prayer halls (surau) that were opened in each village. As part of the dakwah program, policy of "positive discrimination" for newly converted Muslims was also implemented by rewarding of material goods, benefits in the field of education and promotion in the civil service. The purpose of this policy was to facilitate the assimilation of the Orang Asli into the Malay community. However, the results of the dakwah were not impressive. They were especially ineffective in the environment of the Temuan settlements. The percentage of Muslims among the Orang Asli in 1997 was 11.1% in Selangor, 9.2% in Negeri Sembilan, and 14.0% in Melaka. While the percentage among Temuan Muslims was 1,928 people, including 976 people in the state of Selangor, 592 people in the state of Negeri Sembilan, 241 person in the state of Pahang, 118 people in the state of Melaka and one person in the state of Johor.

Although today the Temuans mostly adhere to their animistic beliefs, the rest have now largely converted to either Christianity or Islam. This happens especially when Temuans married with people outside of their ethnic groups, whether it's with the Malays, Chinese or other ethnic groups in the country.

=== Flood myth ===
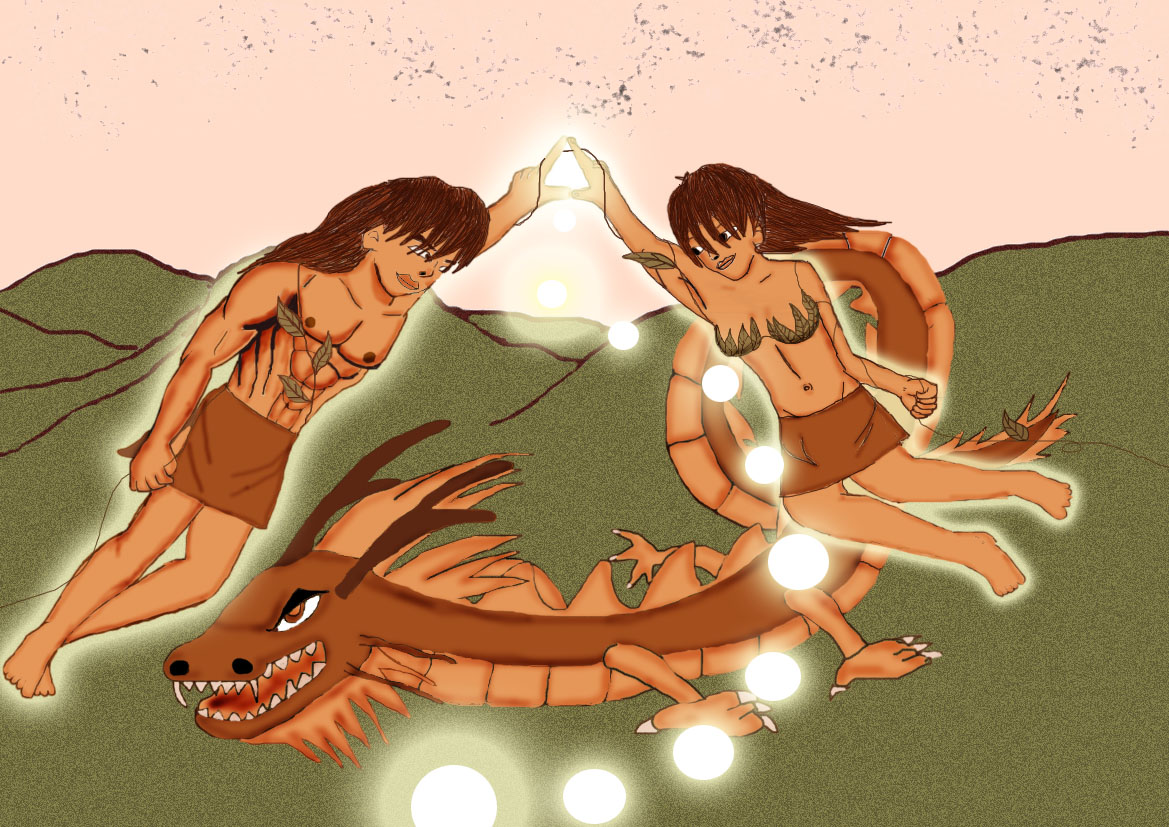
An illustration of Mamak and Inak Bungsuk the founding father and mother of the Temuan people.

Thousands of years ago, many Temuan people died because they had committed "Celau" (the sins that angered god and their ancestors; as it is also called Talan in Semaq Beri language). Their god has sent a "Celau" punishment in a form of a great flood which had drowned all the Temuan sinners that day. Only two of the Temuans, named Mamak and Inak Bungsuk survived that day by climbing on an Eaglewood tree at Gunung Raja (Royal Mountain) located at the border of Selangor and Pahang state. There was a Temuan village over there named Kampung Orang Asli Pertak. Mamak and Inak Bungsuk survived because they had an enchanting mantra or spell to ease down the "Celau" storm. Gunung Gajak (Gunung Rajah, Pahang, Malaysia) became the birth places and ancestral home of the Temuan tribe.

Mamak Bungsuk (Adam) and Inak Bungsuk (Eve) are the Temuan analogues of Adam and Eve in the myth of the birth of humanity.

== Culture ==
=== Celebrations ===
==== Aik Muyang (Ancestor Day) ====
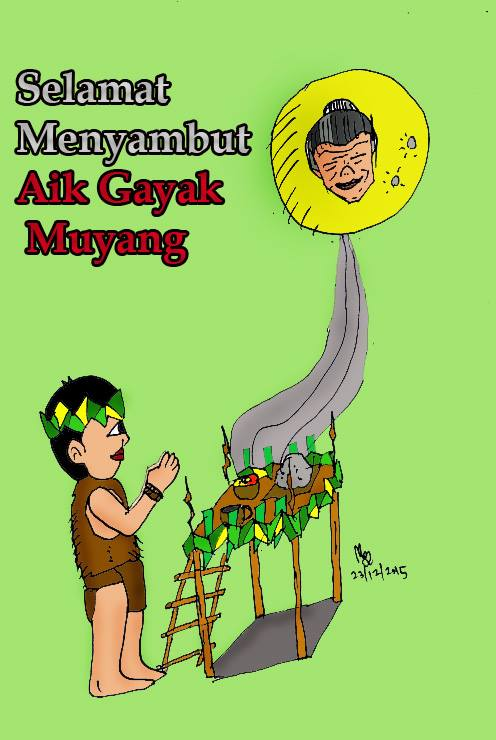
Temuan ancestor day.

The Temuan celebrate Aik Muyang (Ancestor Day) at the end of the year and the beginning of new year. Aik Muyang honoring their ancestor for giving them good life and save from Celau (storm). The celebration take place in different day between 15 December to 15 January.

List of places and its Aik Gayak Muyang celebration dates:

- Kampung Orang Asli Pulau Kempas, Selangor: every 29 December.
- Kampung Orang Asli Sungai Melut, Dengkil, Selangor: every 30 December.
- Kampung Orang Asli Bukit Tadom, Selangor: every 31 December.
- Kampung Orang Asli Puchong, Selangor: every 31 December.
- Kampung Putra, Jelebu, Negeri Sembilan, every 31 December.
- Kampung Orang Asli Langkap Tanjung Ipoh, Negeri Sembilan: every 10 January.
- Kampung Orang Asli Hulu Kuang, Rawang, Selangor: every 1 January.
- Kampung Orang Asli Bukit Machung, Hulu Selangor District, Selangor: every 9 January.
- Kampung Orang Asli Serendah, Hulu Selangor District, Selangor: every 14 January.

==== Gogo (Bogeng) ====
Gogo (Bogeng) is village ceremonial dancing. When the Temuan get married they will organise "Gogo" at between 8 p.m. until 7 a.m. the next day. The live band will play the music and every people from other village join to dance.

=== Customs ===
Some traditional superstitions still held by Temuans:

1. Respect for their elders; bad luck is said to strike those who fail in this.
2. They do not praise a baby, in the belief that it would make the child sick and die.
3. If a Temuan is travelling and a little rain falls, he must slip a leaf into his ear to protect himself on his journey.
4. If a Temuan desires something he cannot get, he must say pinah hunan and put their saliva on his neck, in the belief that failure to do so would result in an accident.
5. A Temuan who must leave a meal in a hurry without eating food must tempot (touch the food to his skin) before leaving, in the belief that failure to do so would result in an accident or death.
6. A Temuan must stay quiet during thunderstorm. If he makes noise, the Thunder god will mistake him for a devil and strike him. Temuans believe that a thunder strike occurs when the Thunder god is hunting devils. That is why they must stay quiet; to prevent the Thunder god from striking at them.
7. A murderer will be haunted by his victim's ghost.
8. Stay away from a place that was haunted, to avoid being disturbed by an evil spirit.

=== Hierarchy structure ===
1. Batin, Temuan leader
2. Mangku, Batin Assistant (temporary replacing Batin when the Batin away from the village)
3. Jenang, Customary leader
4. Menteyik, Batin advisor (Menteyik judgement is not influence by the Batin)
5. Jekerah, Jekerah duty to take care of Enekbuah / Mon
6. Panglimak, Panglimak is Jekerah vassal
7. Bidan / Bomoh / Dukun, Temuan shaman
8. Enekbuah / Mon, ordinary Temuan people

=== Food ===
Typical Temuan food are usually cooked in bamboo. Temuan dishes are such as:

- Catfish Tempoyak cooked with Semomok (Elettariopsis slahmong) leaf
- Ubi with Perah fruit
- Lemang
- Lepat banana leaf
- Ulam (salad) with sambal

=== Traditional medicine ===
The Temuan people also possess knowledge in traditional medicine. There also those from the city folks who would seek consultation from the Orang Asli to cure their illness and problems. Among of the illness that the Temuan shaman could cure are such as fever, diarrhea, blood clot, kidney disease and many more by using herbs or animal based medicine. Examples of herbs used:

- Auricularia auricula-judae and Termitomyces clypeatus for curing fever.
- Polyalthia bullata for diabetes and to increase libido.
- Andrographis paniculata for hypertension and diabetes, and its roots for hematochezia.
- Parkia speciosa for toothache, hypertension and diabetes.

It is also known that the Temuan people themselves have begun to cultivate some of the herbs as an indication of the common health problems faced by them. Examples of such species that have been cultivated by the Temuan people instead of gathering them from the wild are:

- Azadirachta indica for measles.
- Aloe barbadensis for dandruff, hair loss and burns.
- Alpinia galanga for skin infection.
- Cocos nucifera for fever and measles.
- Curcuma longa for acne and pimples.
- Hibiscus rosa-sinensis for grey hair.
- Zingiber officinale for fever and flatulence.

The common method of administering the herbs by the Temuan people are by consuming the decoction of the roots orally, such as the Polyalthia bullata, Andrographis paniculata, Parkia speciosa, Zingiber officinale and many more. Other methods of administering the herbs includes eating, rubbing, chewing, bathing, shampooing and poultice. Some herbs have multiple methods of administering its medicinal properties to treat for different illness. For example, root decoction of Alpinia conchigera is used as a shampoo to clean fleas on the head, its leaves are used as poultice to treat boils and post-childbirth swelling on the stomach, while its rhizome can be pounded as rubbing for bone ache, and also powdered to be mixed with water as poultice for stomach ache.

There are also many of the city folks that uses "Love potion" (Minyak pengasih, literally means "Love oil") from the Orang Asli shamans. Minyak pengasih are among the most popular item obtained from the services of the Orang Asli shamans. The function of the oil is to regain the feelings of lost love ones.

== Housing ==
Traditionally, Temuans built their homes from materials found in a nearby forest. Now there are almost no traditional houses left. Even in remote villages, housing is built of wooden beams and planks using brick and lime. The Temuan village is very similar to the Malay village, except that it can be distinguished only by the presence of dogs, which are forbidden to kept as pets by the Malays. The houses are usually at a certain distance from each other.

There are two types of housing in Desa Temuan, detached houses for the older generation and apartment buildings for young families. Often children live with their parents and rent out their apartments. It happens that some houses are rented out, then the family moves out to live with their relatives in the village. Desa Temuan has 3 shops, a public hall, a museum, a surau, a kindergarten, a playground, a football field, a primary school and a library. Most Temuan villages, although not all, are supplied with electricity and water supply. Traditionally, Temuans used water from a nearby pond for bathing, washing, toilet, and eating; there were even bamboo pipes used for plumbing.

== Education ==
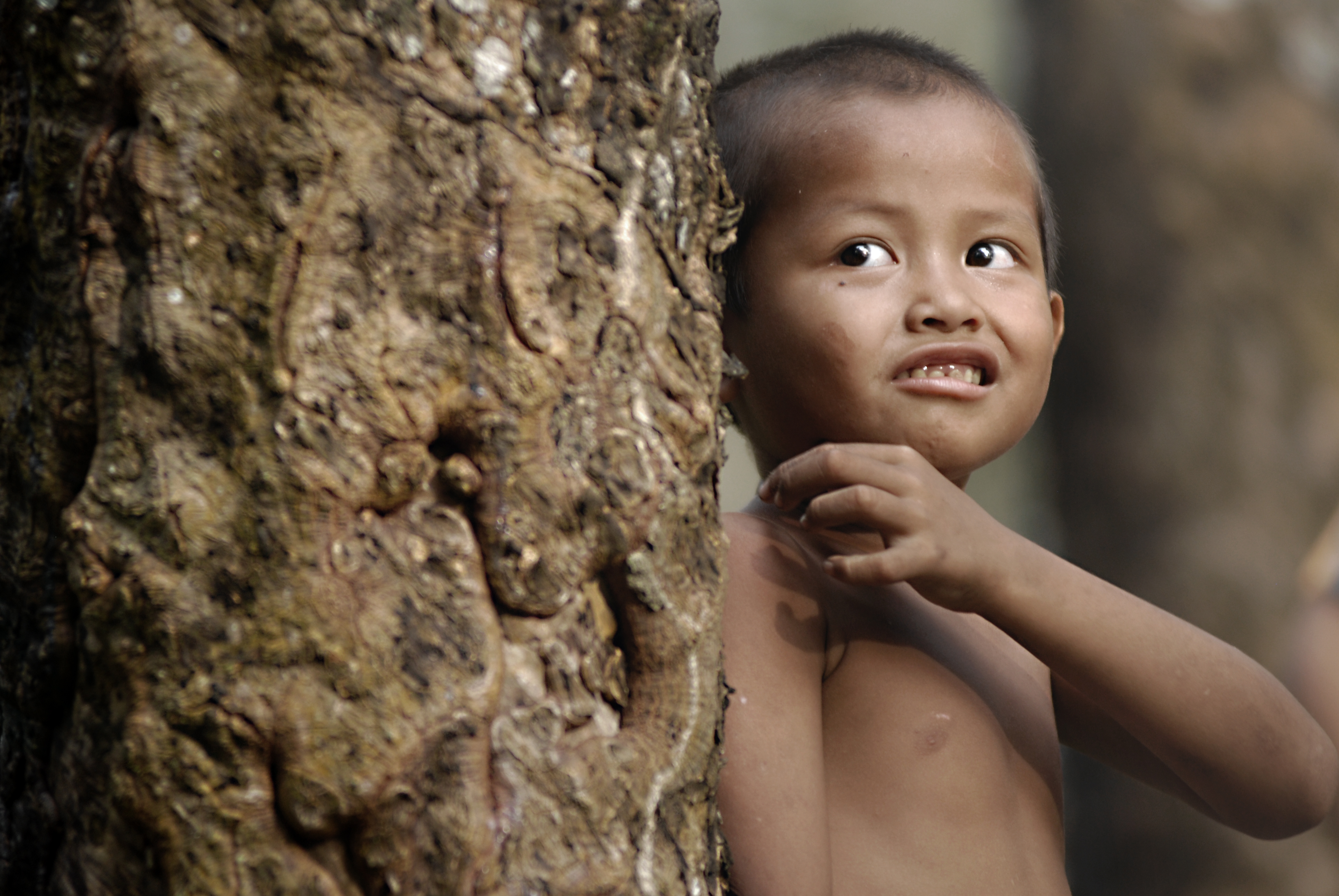
A Temuan child from Kampung Bukit Payung, Melaka.

In a traditional rural society, children did not have the time or need to attend school. They learned basic life skills, such as building traditional houses, made out of tree bark and thatched roofed with leaves, hunting, planting crops, fishing, cooking, and more, from the older generation. For this reason the Temuan people have an indifferent attitude towards formal education system, although living on the outskirts of urban centers has made public schools accessible to them, of which in this respect they are in a much better position than other Orang Asli groups. Most Temuan students drop out after elementary school or after three years of high school. Only a small proportion of Temuan continue their education in colleges and universities.

The lack of education also limits their chances of obtaining a job.

== Loss of traditional knowledge ==
Over the centuries, the Temuan people have formed a rich and diverse culture. But very little of it has been documented, traditional knowledge has been passed down orally from generation to generation. Oral tradition began to be lost during the World War II and the Malayan Emergency, when Temuan communities experienced forced relocation. Oral knowledge ceased, and by the time the Temuans returned to the jungle in the early 1960s, much of their tradition had been lost. The process continued in connection with the implementation of development projects and the relocation of Temuan communities to urban areas. Old traditions became unnecessary for the generation born and grew up in an urban environment.

Although the Desa Temuan settlers still retain the Temuan language, they have a Committee of Village Development and Security (Jawatankuasa Kemajuan dan Keselamatan Kampung in Malay, JKKK), headed by a traditional tok batin leader that adheres to the customary norms of rights. But traditional ceremonies, dances, cuisine and even folk games are a thing of the past. Not many now own a traditional craft, but these items can be seen at a local museum. Traditional medicine is also a thing of the past, people no longer turn to dukuns for treatment, they prefer to receive help in modern medical institutions such as clinics and hospitals. Traditional New Year Gayak Muyang are longer celebrated, as the Temuans now celebrate the New Year with other Malaysians. Traditional holidays with mass consumption of alcoholic beverages and loud dances do not fit into the environment of city life, hence disturbing the peace of their neighbours.

Temuan people are well known for their knowledge in the use of natural remedies. Dozens of plant species, as well as fungi and some animals, are used as raw materials for medicines. Temuans use them to treat many types of diseases, from wounds and joint pain to such serious ailments as bone fractures, hypertension, diabetes, leukemia and tumors, and other chronic diseases. Some plants are collected in the forest, some are grown in backyards, among them are also non-native plants. Most drugs are administered orally, followed by external use. The most common methods of preparation of phytotherapy are decoction and powder obtained by grinding in a mortar. Now modern medicines have become easily available for Temuan people. Instead, resettlement and forest degradation complicate the collection of medicinal materials in nature. There is a real threat of erosion and loss of unique knowledge of folk medicine, because young people are no longer interested in maintaining them.

== Settlement area ==
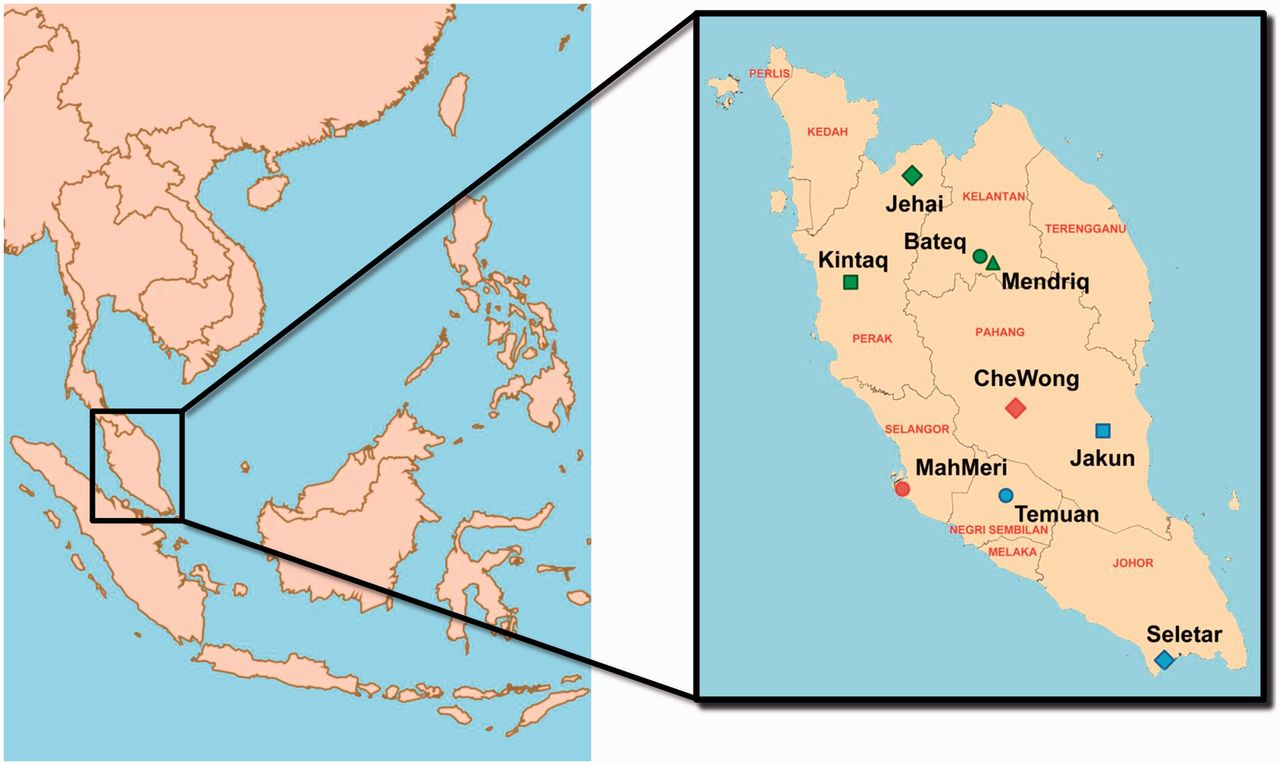
Geographical location of Temuan people and other Orang Asli communities in Peninsular Malaysia.

Some of the settlements where the Temuan people are located include:

- Tampeh Hill, Dengkil, Sepang, Selangor
- Kampung Sungai Kelubi, Hulu Selangor District, Selangor
- Bukit Lanjan, Damansara Perdana, Petaling Jaya, Selangor
- Kampong Kuala Pangsoon, Hulu Langat District, Selangor
- Broga, Semenyih, Selangor
- Kampung Paya Lebar, Sungai Lui, Hulu Langat District, Selangor
- RPS Bukit Cheeding, Kuala Langat District, Selangor
- RPS Kuala Kubu Bharu, Selangor
- Kampung Bukit Tadom, Labuhan Dagang, Banting, Kuala Langat District, Selangor
- Kampung Busut Baru, Kuala Langat District, Selangor
- Kampung Guntor, Kuala Pilah District, Negeri Sembilan
- Parit Gong, Negeri Sembilan
- Kampung Tohor, Jelebu District, Negeri Sembilan
- Kampung Bukit Payong, Melaka
- Kampung Lubuk Bandung, Melaka
- Kampung Orang Asli Sungai Mering, Pekan Asahan, Melaka
- Kampung Orang Asli Tekir, Labu, Seremban, Negeri Sembilan
- Kampung Orang Asli Kubang Badak, Tebong, Alor Gajah District, Melaka
- Kampung Orang Asli Bukit kemandol, Jenjarom, Kuala Langat District, Selangor
- Kampung Orang Asli Seksyen 8, Taman Botanic, Shah Alam, Selangor
- Bukit Kecik, Kuala Langat District, Selangor
- Bukit Perah, Batu Kikir, Jempol District, Negeri Sembilan
- Kampung Putra, Durian Tipus, Negeri Sembilan
- Kampung Orang Asli Pulau Kempas, Banting, Kuala Langat District. Selangor

== See also ==
- Sagong Tasi
