= Sagong Tasi =

2002 land rights case in Malaysia

The Sagong Tasi case (Sagong bin Tasi & Ors v Kerajaan Negeri Selangor, 2002) was a landmark land rights case in Malaysia, in which the courts ruled against the Selangor State in favour of the Temuan-Orang Asli (also known as Temuan) plaintiffs.

In 1995, Selangor state authorities ordered members of the Temuan tribe to vacate their homes at Kampong Bukit Tampoi, Selangor. They were given 14 days to leave, and monetary compensation was offered for their destroyed homes, fruit trees and crops but not for their ancestral land. They refused to leave and were forcibly evicted by the police.

In response, the Temuan plaintiffs sued the Federal government, the Selangor State government, the Malaysian Highway Authority (LLM) and contractor United Engineers Malaysia Bhd (UEM Group) for this forced eviction. In April 2002, the Malaysian High Court ruled against the Selangor State, and recognised the Temuan plaintiffs as the customary owners of the land according to common law. Also, the court ruled that the State had breached their fiduciary duties, and ordered financial compensation for the plaintiffs. The case was settled on 26 May 2010, with RM6.5 million compensation for the Temuan plaintiffs.

== Background ==
=== Orang Asli land rights in Malaysia ===
Malaysia's laws do not formally recognise Orang Asli land rights. Based on the 1965 National Land Code, all land belongs to the respective states, or in case of federal territories, the federal government. Private land interests are recognised when ownership is registered, but Orang Asli land ownership tends to be unregistered, traditionally passed down over many generations.

Furthermore, Malaysia's Land Acquisition Act 1960 reinforces state power over land ownership. Section 3 of the Act states that:

The State Authority may acquire any land which is needed—

(a) for any public purpose;
(b) by any person or corporation for any purpose which in the opinion of the State Authority is beneficial to the economic development of Malaysia or any part thereof or to the public generally or any class of the public;

(c) for the purpose of mining or for residential, agricultural, commercial, industrial or recreational purposes or any combination of such purposes.

Although the 1954 Aboriginal People's Act (formerly the Aboriginal Peoples Ordinance) allows political authorities to gazette certain plots of land as protected aboriginal reserves, the Orang Asli are not regarded as the legal owners of these reserves. Furthermore, under Section 6 of the Act, the State is vested with powers to change the status of these formerly gazetted areas, thereby removing any long-standing legal protection. Inhabited Orang Asli lands which are not gazetted are even less protected.

== Timeline ==
=== Forced eviction of the Temuans from Kampong Bukit Tampoi, Selangor (1995) ===
In 1995, the Selangor State government forcibly evicted the Temuan community at Kampong Bukit Tampoi, Selangor, giving them 14 days to leave. Against their will, their houses and plantations were demolished to make space for the new Nilai–KLIA Highway to Kuala Lumpur International Airport (KLIA). According to the Asian Indigenous and Tribal Peoples Network, the hasty eviction was carried out without due process of negotiation and evaluation, so as to complete the Nilai–KLIA Highway in time for Kuala Lumpur's 1998 Commonwealth Games.

While they were paid a nominal amount for their crops and dwellings, there was no compensation for the 15.57ha of land. The authorities maintained that the Temuan were mere tenants on state land and the State was not required to compensate them. The Temuan landowners were made to accept compensation cheques (for their crops and houses which were demolished) but in protest, all did not cash their cheques immediately – although they did so later based on advice from their lawyers.

=== The Sagong Tasi case (1996) ===
In 1996, with a team of pro-bono lawyers from the Bar Council (led by Datuk Dr Cyrus Das and assisted by Jerald Gomez, Rashid Ismail, Sharmila Sekaran and Leena Ghosh), the Temuan plaintiffs fought the case in the Shah Alam High Court under Judge Mohamad Noor Ahmad J.

The plaintiffs in the case were Sagong Tasi (whose name was used to represent the case), Kachut Tunchit, Dabat Chabat, Kepal Kepong, Sani Saken, Illas Senin and Tukas Siam, who were among 23 Temuan family heads from Kampong Bukit Tampoi, Selangor.

The defendants were the Federal government, the Selangor State government, the Malaysian Highway Authority (LLM) and contractor United Engineers Malaysia Bhd (UEM Group).

=== Proof of distinct Temuan territory and culture as court evidence ===
During the case, the counsel for the plaintiffs asserted that the Temuan were "owners by custom" with native title land rights, even though it was not registered in the land registry.

The defendants acknowledged that the plaintiffs are aboriginal Temuan people, "but challenge[d] the fact as to whether they still continue to practice their Temuan culture". The Judge pointed out that this required the plaintiffs "to show that they speak an aboriginal language, follow an aboriginal way of life as well as aboriginal customs and beliefs".

One of the witnesses for the Temuans' case was Dr Colin Nicholas, coordinator of the Center for Orang Asli Concerns (COAC) in Malaysia. He provided visual, oral history and archival evidence that the Temuans had been living at Kampong Bukit Tampoi, Selangor for at least seven generations.

To further display the existence of a distinctive Temuan culture associated with the land (adat tanah), court evidence included details about the Temuans' customary burial (adat kebumian), their religion or belief system about the ancestor-protector-spirits (the Moyangs), their community weapon (the blowpipe, or sumpitan), their tradition of sekor-menakor, their personal and place-names, their custom on inheritance, their traditional activities and their aboriginal language.

The Temuan traditions of ownership were also explained to the court, for example the clearly defined family lots within the communal territory which were demarcated by geographical markers (such as the pinang palm, other fruit trees, or rivers). It was explained that these boundaries had been fixed by their ancestors, and communally recognised.

Part of this evidence included the plotting of customary markers (for example, the Temuan's graves and territorial markers) onto existing survey maps using the Global Positioning System (GPS) equipment. Archives were also presented to the court to prove the Orang Asli Affairs Department's (also known as Jabatan Hal Ehwal Orang Asli, or JHEOA) prior recognition of the existence of the Temuan community at Kampong Bukit Tampoi, Selangor.

=== The effect of national and international networks of "aboriginal peoples" ===
The identification of the Temuan as 'aboriginal people' allowed the counsel for the plaintiffs and Judge to draw on other national and international legal precedents in discussing the issue of native title land rights and common law rights for aboriginal people.

In deriving features of native title and common law rights for aboriginal peoples, the Judge ruled that:

(a) it is a right acquired in law and not based on any document of title

(b) it does not require any conduct by any person to complete it nor does it depend upon any legislative, executive or judicial declaration
(c) native title is a right enforceable by the courts
(d) native title and interest in aboriginal land is not lost by colonisation, instead the radical title held by the Sovereign becomes encumbered with native rights in respect of the aboriginal land
(e) native title can be extinguished by clear and plain legislation or by an executive act authorised by such legislation but compensation should be paid

(f) the aboriginal people do not become trespassers in their own lands by the establishment of a colony or sovereignty.

These features were based on national and international legal precedents, including

- The Malaysian cases of Adong bin Kuwau & Ors v. Kerajaan Negeri Johor & Anor [1997] 1 MLJ 418 and Kerajaan Negeri Johor & Anor v. Adong bin Kuwau & Ors [1998] 2 CLJ 665
- The Malaysian case of Nor Anak Nyawai & Ors v. Borneo Pulp Plantation Sdn. Bhd. & Ors [2001] 2 CLJ 769
- The Canadian case of Calder v. A-G of British Columbia [1973] 34 DLR (3d) 145
- The Australian cases of Mabo & Ors v. State of Queensland & Anor [1986] 64 ALR 1, Mabo v. Queensland [1991–1992] 175 CLR 1
- The Australian case of [Wik Peoples v Queensland The Wik Peoples v. The State of Queensland & Ors] [1996] 187 CLR 1
- The Australian case of Ward & Ors (on behalf of the Miriuwung and Gajerrong People) & Ors v. State of Western Australia & Ors [1998] 159 ALR 483
- Pareroultja & Ors v. Tickner & Ors [1993] 117 ALR 206
- The Nigerian case of Amodu Tijani v. The Secretary, Southern Nigeria [1921] 2 AC 399
- The Canadian case of Delgamuukw v. The Queen in right of British Columbia et al.; First Nations Summit et al., Interveners [1997] 153 DLR (4th) 193
- The American case of Johnson and Graham's Lessee v. William M'Intosh [1823] 21 US 681

Such national and international precedents strengthened the Temuan plaintiffs' case, as the Judge was keen to ensure that Malaysia was on par with international standards of international law and universal human rights related to "aboriginal peoples", perhaps due to the efforts of transnational networks such as the International Labour Organization (ILO), the UN Working Group on Indigenous Populations and the Asia Indigenous Peoples Pact.

=== High Court ruling (2002) ===
On 12 April 2002, the Shah Alam High Court set a national precedent by ruling that the Temuan enjoyed native title rights over their traditional lands and they were to be compensated according to the Land Acquisition Act. The Judge ordered the four defendants (the Federal government, the Selangor State government, LLM and UEM Group) to pay compensation to the Temuan landowners, and further ordered that LLM and UEM Group pay damages for trespassing. Significantly, the Judge also ruled that the State had breached a fiduciary duty, that is, an ethical duty to protect the welfare and native title land rights of the Orang Asli, and to provide remedies when such rights were infringed.

=== Court Appeals and subsequent rulings (2002–2009) ===
All four defendants appealed the 2002 decision, and this was heard in the Malaysian Court of Appeal on 19 September 2005, before Judges Gopal Sri Ram, Ariffin Zakaria and Nik Hashim Nik Abdul Rahman. The appeal judges upheld the ruling of the High Court to rule that the Temuan did have native title rights over their customary lands. A subsequent appeal was then made to the Federal Court of Malaysia.

=== Significance of political shifts ===
The forced acquisition of the land at Kampong Bukit Tampoi, Selangor, in 1995 took place under the Barisan Nasional-led State government, which was then sued by the Temuan plaintiffs. After the Temuans won at the High Court in 2002, the Barisan Nasional–led State government appealed the decision – but in 2005, the Malaysian Court of Appeal affirmed the previous ruling of the High Court.

The Barisan Nasional-led State government then re-appealed the decision. However, before the appeal could be heard at the Federal Court of Malaysia, the informal political coalition Pakatan Rakyat came to power in Selangor during the Malaysian general election, 2008. The Pakatan Rakyat–led Selangor State government decided to postpone the appeal at the Federal Court of Malaysia for an internal study of the situation, and it subsequently withdrew the appeal on 22 April 2009, to symbolically recognise Orang Asli native title land rights. This paved the way for a final settlement for the Temuan plaintiffs.

=== Final settlement (2010) ===
On 26 May 2010, after negotiations with the Attorney-General's Chambers, both sides agreed to a settlement of RM6.5 million for the Temuan plaintiffs. The sum was to be paid by the acquirer of the land, LLM on its own behalf as well as for the Federal Government, and UEM Group. The 26 affected Temuan families were to be compensated based on the size of land taken from them.

== Developments following the Sagong Tasi case ==
The position advanced by the Selangor State government (before the withdrawal of appeal) in the Sagong Tasi case was that the Orang Asli are generally considered mere tenants of their unregistered ancestral land, since under the 1965 National Land Code, all land belongs to the respective states, or in case of federal territories, the federal government. However, the High Court dismissed the Selangor State Government's argument and confirmed the existence of Orang Asli native title under common law, even without private ownership registration in the land registry – a decision that was upheld by other courts during subsequent appeals by the defendants. This is an important legal precedent for future land rights cases concerning the Orang Asli in Malaysia. Although this court ruling failed to prevent the government acquisition of the Kampong Bukit Tampoi land, and the eventual settlement of RM6.5 million was below market value (according to Dr Colin Nicholas, coordinator of the Center for Orang Asli Concerns (COAC) in Malaysia), Orang Asli civil society actors hope that it will help to protect other Orang Asli land in future.

Furthermore, the Selangor State Government's withdrawal of appeal (under Pakatan Rakyat) on the Sagong Tasi case in April 2009 signalled an increased recognition of Orang Asli land rights. Following this case, the Selangor State government was aided by the Sabah-based organisation PACOS Trust which trained the Orang Asli in Selangor to map their territories using the Global Positioning System (GPS). The State Government also pledged to gazette some 25 Orang Asli villages by August 2010 in an ongoing effort to protect Orang Asli territories. For example, Kampung Jambu in Selangor was originally slated for commercial development, but in February 2011, the Selangor State government decided to return the premium to the developer and gazette it as a protected Orang Asli reserve.

Still, Selangor State's executive councillor and Orang Asli Land Taskforce chairperson Elizabeth Wong acknowledged some potential problems, for example, that there might be overlapping claims of land ownership by the Orang Asli, or that some previously unmapped land might already have been sold to commercial developers. It also remains to be seen how political shifts in future may change the situation for the Orang Asli in Selangor.

== See also ==
- Orang Asli Affairs Department
- Aboriginal title
- Malaysian legal history
- Bumiputera (Malaysia)
- Temuan language
