= Amodu Tijani v Secretary, Southern Nigeria =

1921 court case

Amodu Tijani v Secretary, Southern Nigeria [1921] 2 AC 399, [1921] UKPC 80, also known as the Apapa land case, was a decision of the Judicial Committee of the Privy Council concerning land title.

== Background and lower courts ==
The controversy at issue in the case arose in 1913, when the colonial government of Nigeria appropriated land in Apapa, pursuant to the Public Land (Acquisition) Ordinance 1903, in order to give it to European merchants. The land was occupied by the Oluwa chiefly family of Lagos, under the leadership of Amodu Tijani. Tijani argued before the Nigerian courts that he was owed compensation for the expropriation, because the land belonged to him personally. His claim was unsuccessful. This case discussed the English doctrine of tenure. More of the background of this case were discussed by Alonso and Adadi in their view of the English doctrine of tenure. Their view was based on the Uganda view of the doctrine of tenure and that of the English doctrine of tenure.

== Privy Council ==
The Privy Council, reversing the judgments below, held that although the territory of the Lagos Colony had been ceded to the imperial Crown in 1861 under the Lagos Treaty of Cession and the Crown thereby acquired allodial title to the land, the Crown held only a "limited right of administrative interference" with the land and was required to pay compensation for using it. Tijani, as the leader of the community living on the land, held usufructuary rights on the community's behalf. The Privy Council's decision established that land rights at customary law could be enforced by imperial courts. Kent McNeil argues that Tijani follows a presumption that property rights at private law continue in force despite a change in sovereign control over territory.

Ben Silverstein calls Tijani "perhaps the most important of the Privy Council's decisions on native title".

== See also ==
- Calder v British Columbia (Attorney General)
- Delgamuukw v British Columbia
- Mabo v Queensland (No 2)
- Sagong Tasi

== Sources ==
- Elias, T. O. (1951). "Nigeria's Contribution to Colonial Law". Journal of Comparative Legislation and International Law. 33: 49–55. ISSN 1479-5949. JSTOR 754333.
- Ibhawoh, Bonny (3 October 2013). Imperial Justice: Africans in Empire's Court. Oxford University Press. doi:10.1093/acprof:oso/9780199664849.001.0001. ISBN 978-0-19-966484-9.
- Park, AEW (November 1964). "The Cession of Territory and Private Land Rights: A Reconsideration of the Tijani Case". Nigerian Law Journal. 1 (1): 38–49 – via HeinOnline.
- Silverstein, Ben (January 2007). "The Rule of Native Title: A View of Mabo in the British Empire". Griffith Law Review. 16 (1): 55–82. doi:10.1080/10383441.2007.10854582. ISSN 1038-3441.
