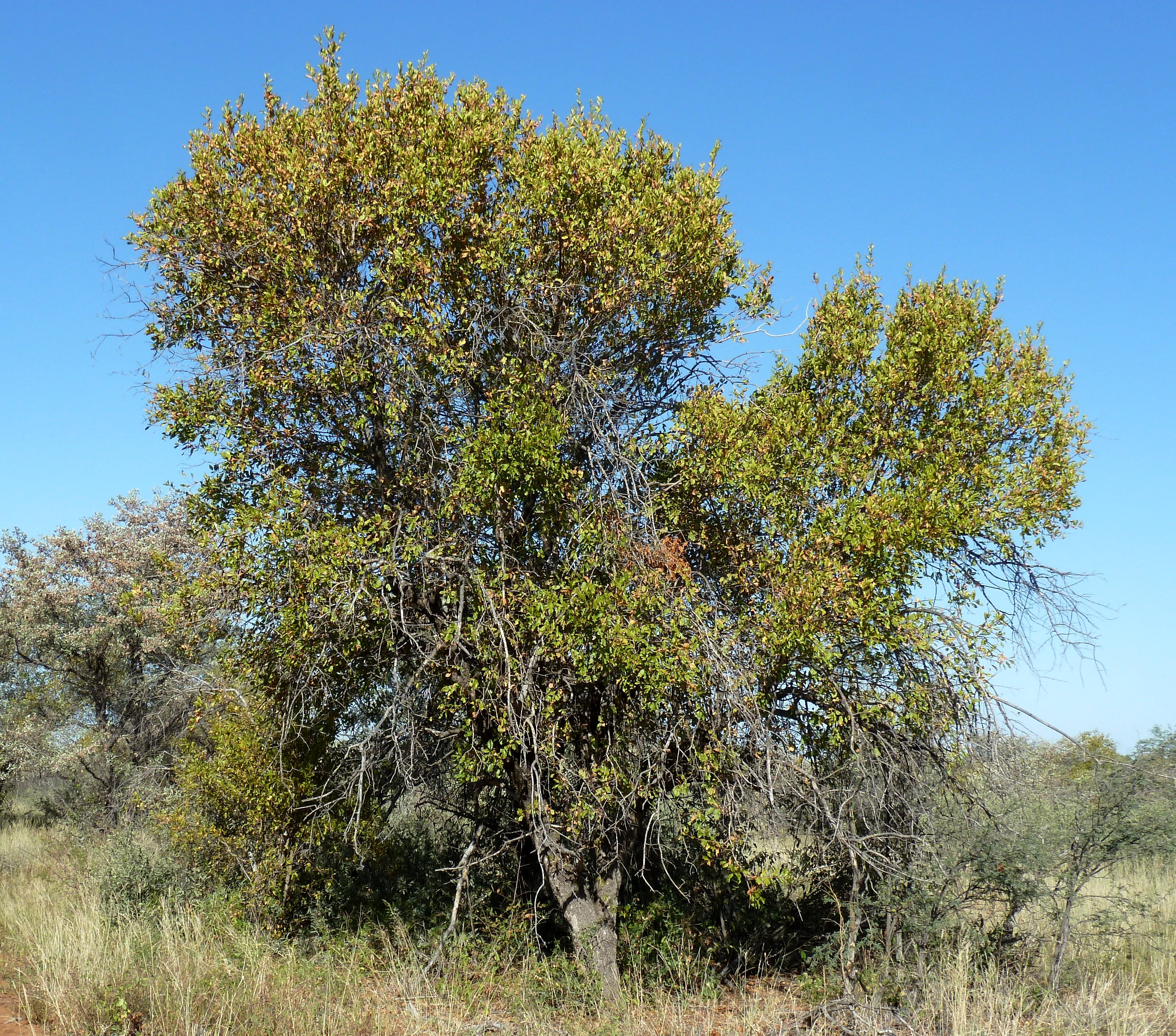
- Nominate subsp. in Limpopo, South Africa
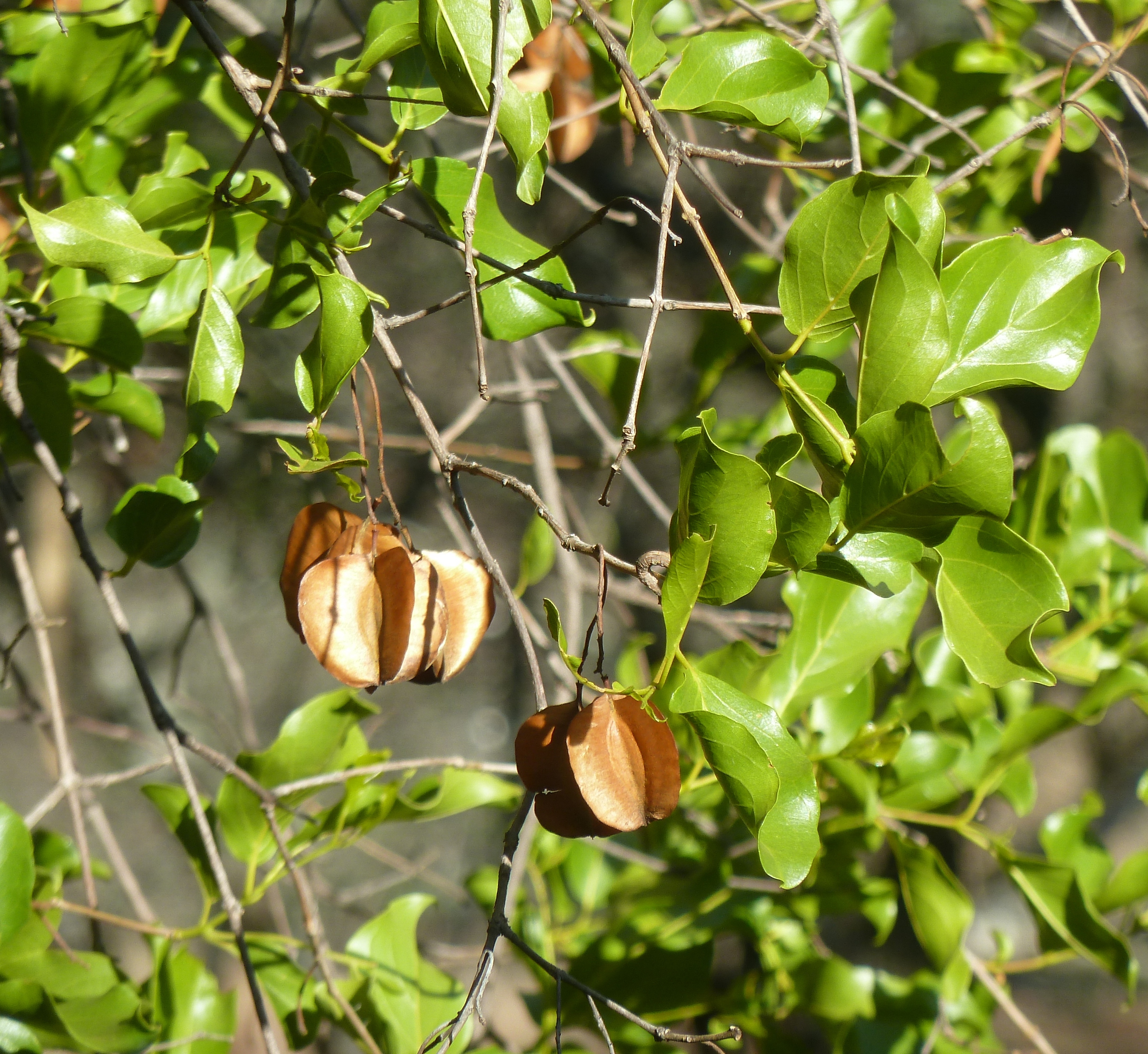
- Fruit and foliage, Limpopo

Scientific classification
- Kingdom: Plantae
- Clade: Tracheophytes
- Clade: Angiosperms
- Clade: Eudicots
- Clade: Rosids
- Order: Myrtales
- Family: Combretaceae
- Genus: Combretum
- Species: C. apiculatum

Binomial name
- Combretum apiculatum Sond.

= Combretum apiculatum =

Red bushwillow

Species of flowering plant

Combretum apiculatum is a species of tree in the family Combretaceae known by the common name red bushwillow. It is native to the mesic to semi-arid savanna regions of Africa, southwards of the equator.

== Description ==
This is a semi-deciduous tree growing up to 10 meters tall, or sometimes a shrub remaining shorter. It has rough gray-black bark with fissures, and the smaller branches may be woolly in texture. The oppositely arranged leaves are up to 11 to 13 centimeters long. They are hairless or hairy. The tip of the leaf tapers abruptly to a twisted point. The foliage turns reddish or golden in the fall. The spike inflorescences emerge between the leaves and are up to 7 centimeters long. They bear yellow or green flowers with tiny sepals and petals, and with style and stamens about half a centimeter long. The flowers have a strong scent. The reddish, winged fruit is 2 or 3 centimeters long.

== Subspecies ==
There are two subspecies, the southern ssp. apiculatum, and ssp. leutweinii, which occurs from Namibia to Malawi and northwards, which is differentiated by its more hirsute leaves.

== Range and habitat ==
It occurs in South Africa, Eswatini, Botswana, Mozambique, Namibia, Zimbabwe, southern Angola, Zambia, Malawi, southeastern DRC, Tanzania and southern Kenya.

This tree occurs in various ecosystems in southern Africa. It is the dominant tree on the savanna in many areas, including regions characterized as lowveld and mopane savanna. It grows alongside other woody vegetation such as common hook thorn (Acacia afra), sicklebush (Dichrostachys cinerea), large sourplum (Ximenia afra), livelong (Lannea discolor), white seringa (Kirkia acuminata), and marula (Sclerocarya afra).

== Utilization by game and livestock ==
Many animals use the tree, especially for food. Kudu, bushbuck, elands, giraffes, and elephants browse the leaves. Eland are so attracted to the tree that they can do damage to it with their feeding. The brown-headed parrot eats the seeds.

Cattle also eat the leaves. The fruits are hazardous to livestock, however, because they are toxic. The foliage can be fed to goats as a supplemental fodder.

== Human use ==
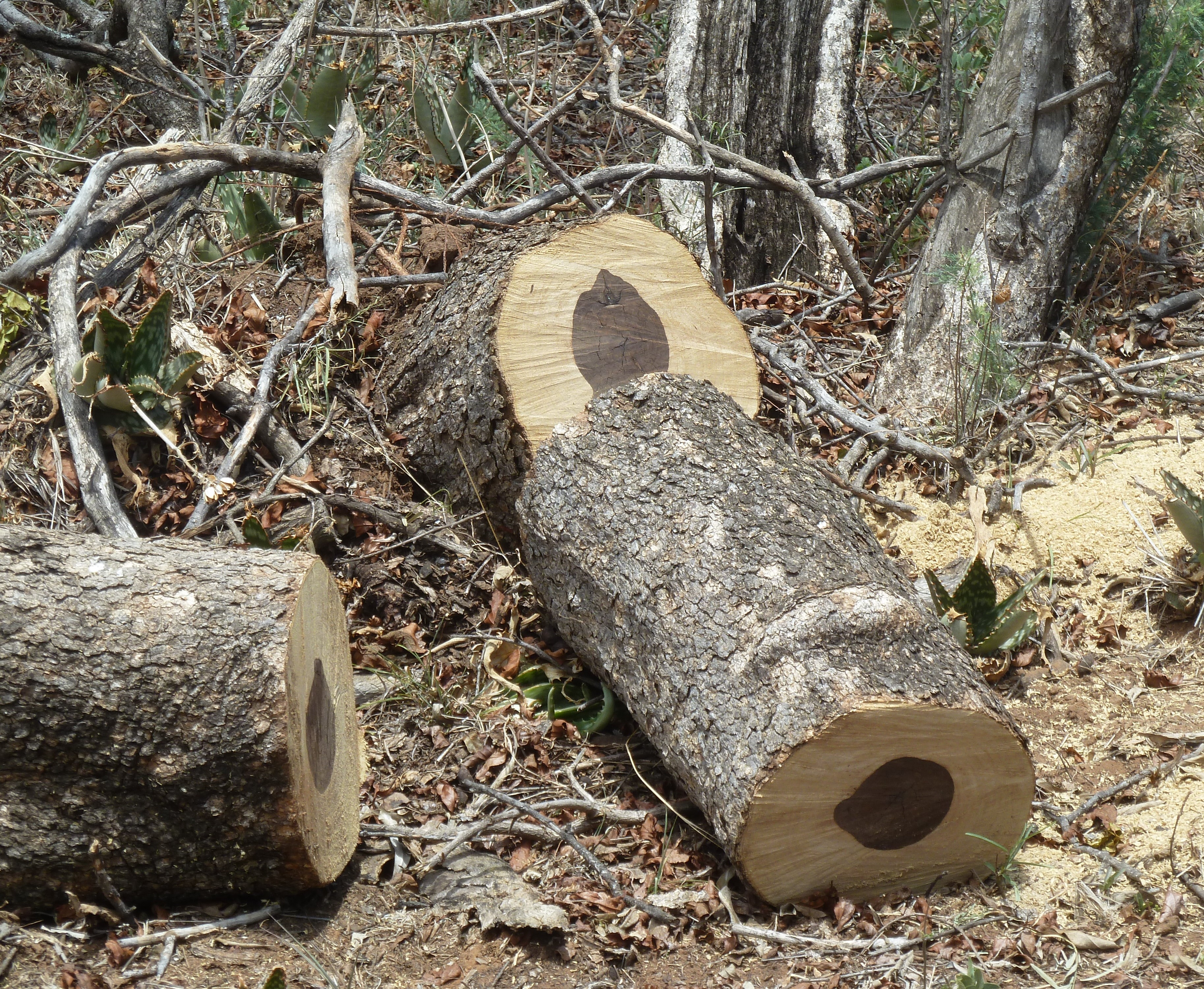
C. apiculatum logs, showing dark heartwood and pale sapwood

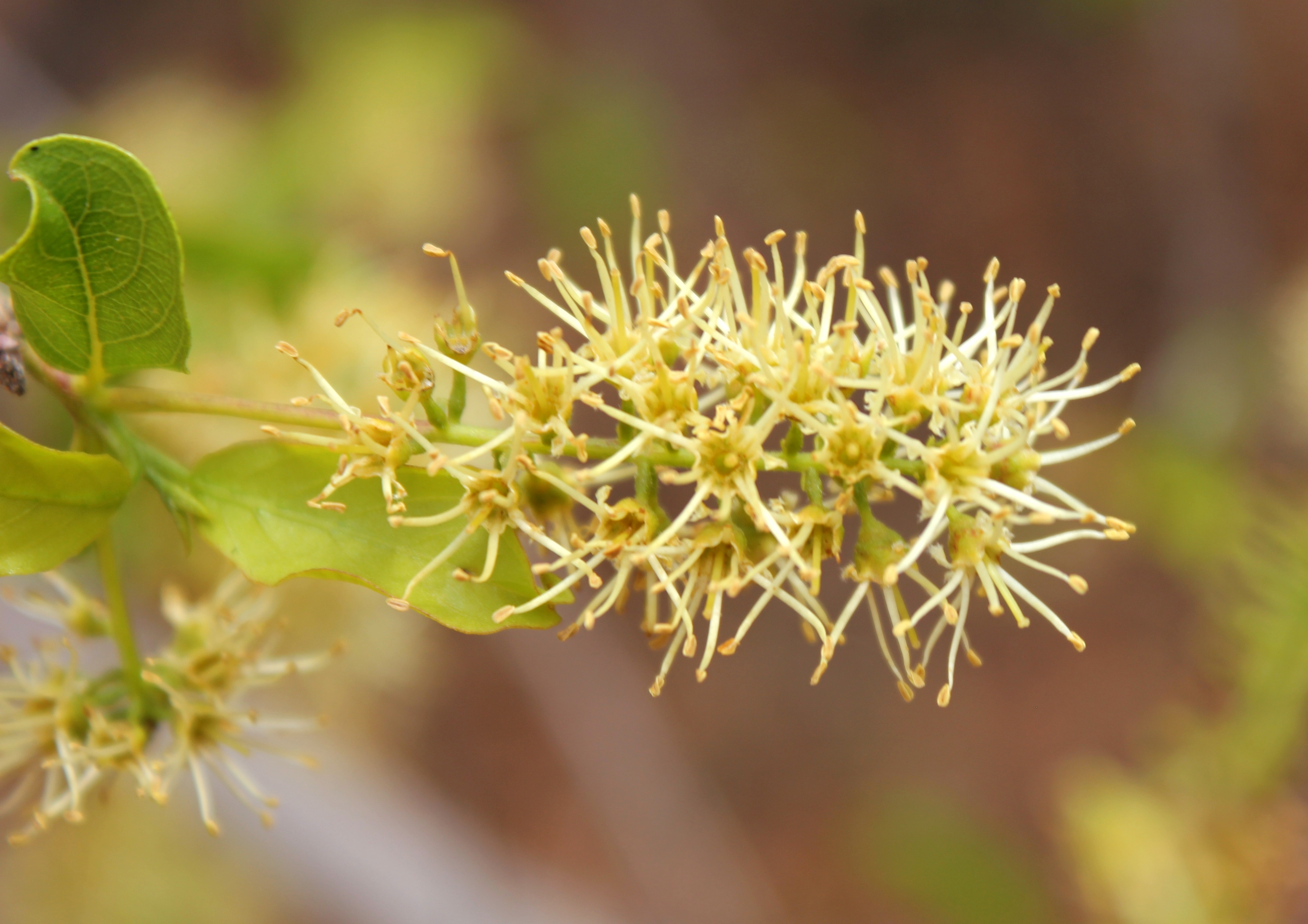
Inflorescence

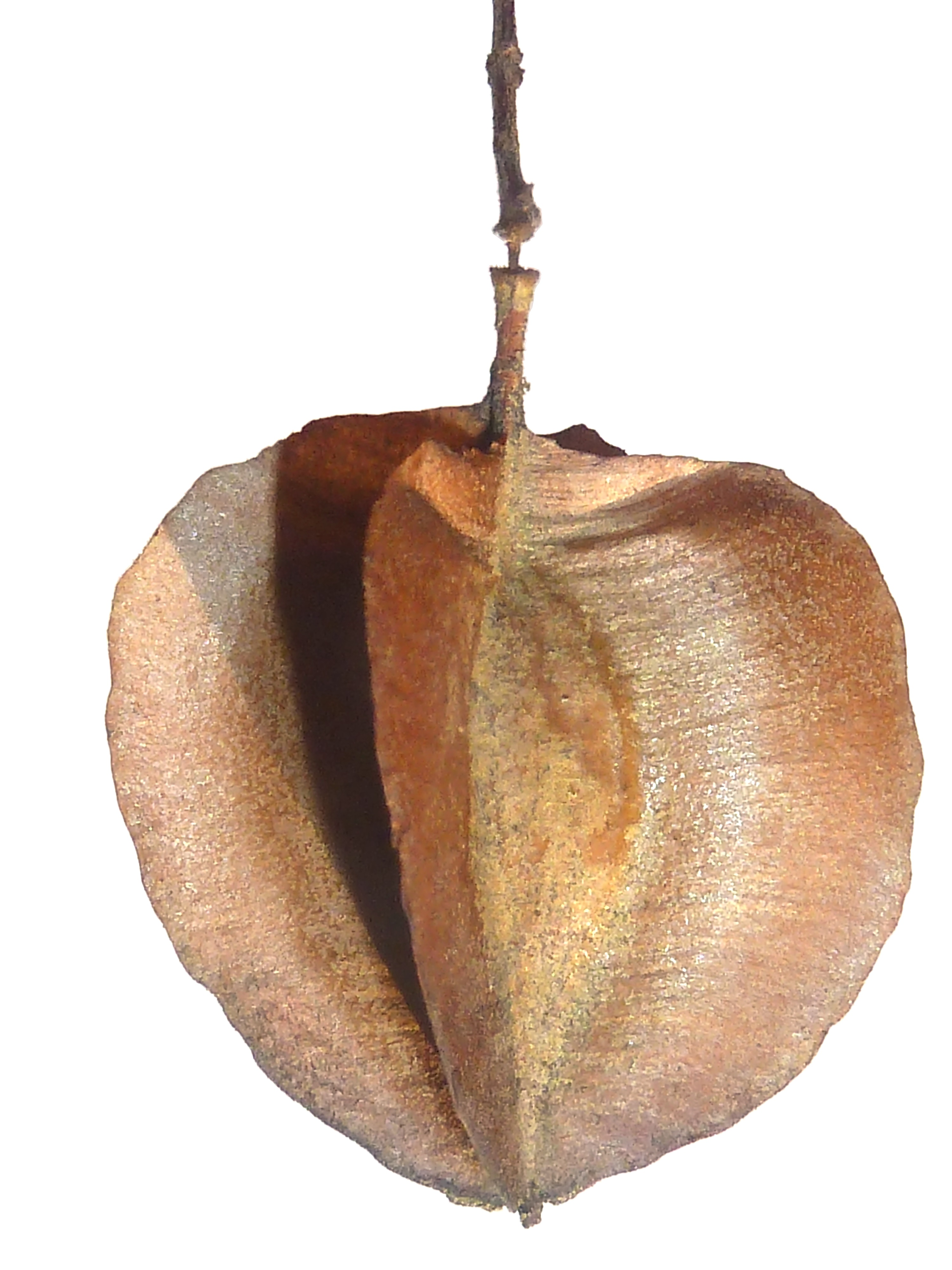
C. apiculatum fruit, a winged achene containing one seed

This tree has dense (1.15), fine-grained, strong, dark brown to black heartwood, sometimes used as firewood or for making charcoal. It is hard, and termite-resistant. The tree responds well to coppicing, growing back with plentiful foliage. The bark has been used in leather tanning. Medicinal uses for the species include the treatment of conjunctivitis and stomach ailments. It contains a number of antioxidant compounds, such as cardamonin, pinocembrin, quercetin, and kaempferol. It is an appropriate garden tree, as it is tolerant of frost and drought and provides shade.

== Vernacular names ==
Common names for the tree in other languages include rooiboswilg (Afrikaans), umbondwe (Zulu), imbondvo (Swazi), mohwidiri (Tswana), mohwelere (Sepedi), muvuvha (Tshivenḓa), ndhuva (Tsonga), rukweza (Shona), and omumbuti (Herero).
