= Department of Orang Asli Development =

Malaysian government agency

- Jabatan Kemajuan Orang Asli (JAKOA) جابتن كماجوان اورڠ اصلي

Department overview
- Formed: February 25, 1954; 72 years ago
- Jurisdiction: Government of Malaysia
- Headquarters: Wisma Selangor Dredging, Jalan Ampang, Kuala Lumpur, Malaysia; 2°N 101°E
- Minister responsible: Ahmad Zahid Hamidi, Minister of Rural and Regional Development
- Deputy Minister responsible: Rubiah Wang, Deputy Minister of Rural and Regional Development
- Department executives: Sapiah Mohd Nor, Director-General; Vacant, Secretary-General
- Parent department: Ministry of Rural Development
- Key document: Aboriginal Peoples Act 1954 (Act 134)
- Website: www.jakoa.gov.my

The Department of Orang Asli Development (Malay: Jabatan Kemajuan Orang Asli; Jawi: جابتن كماجوان اورڠ اصلي), abbreviated JAKOA, is the Malaysian government agency entrusted to oversee the affairs of the Orang Asli. This body is under the Malaysian Ministry of Rural and Regional Development and was first set up in 1954.

== History ==
During the Malayan Emergency of 1948 to 1960, the Orang Asli became a vital component of national security, as with their help, the Malayan army was able to defeat the communist insurgents. Two administrative initiatives were introduced to highlight the importance of Orang Asli as well to protect its identity. The initiatives were the establishment of the Department of Aborigines in 1950 and the enactment of the Aboriginal Peoples Ordinance in 1954.

After independence in 1957, the development of Orang Asli become the prime objective of the government, where the government adopted a policy in 1961 to integrate the Orang Asli into the wider Malaysian society.

Among the stated objectives of the department are to eradicate poverty among the Orang Asli, improving their health, promoting education, and improving their general livelihood. There is a high incidence of poverty among the Orang Asli. In 1997, 80% of all Orang Asli lived below the poverty line. This ratio is extremely high compared to the national poverty rate of 8.5% at that time.

The Orang Asli are theoretically classified as Bumiputras, a status signifying indigeneity to Malaysia which carries certain social, economic, and political rights, along with the Malays and the natives of Sabah and Sarawak. However, this status is generally not mentioned in the constitution.

Some legislations which concerns Orang Asli are the National Land Code 1965, Land Conservation Act 1960, Protection of Wildlife Act 1972, National Parks Act 1980, and most importantly the Aboriginal Peoples Act 1954. The Aboriginal Peoples Act 1954 provides for the setting up and establishment of the Orang Asli Reserve Land. However, the Act also includes the power accorded to the Director-General of the JHEOA to order Orang Asli out of such reserved land at its discretion and awards compensation to affected people, also at its discretion.

A landmark case on this matter is in the 2002 case of Sagong bin Tasi & Ors v Kerajaan Negeri Selangor. The case was concerned with the state using its powers conferred under the 1954 Act to evict Orang Asli from gazetted Orang Asli Reserve Land. The High Court ruled in favour of Sagong Tasi, who represented the Orang Asli, and this decision was upheld by the Court of Appeal.

On 1 May 2018, Ajis Sitin from the Semai tribe, became the first Orang Asli to be appointed Director-General.

He was replaced a year later by former Universiti Malaya anthropologist Juli Edo. Juli spoke out against attempts to convert the Orang Asli, particularly by the Islamist PAS government in Kelantan. He was also vocal about the need to defend Orang Asli ancestral lands against land grab.

On 14 September 2021, Sapiah Mohd Nor, the sister of Member of Parliament (MP) for Cameron Highlands Ramli Mohd Nor became the first Orang Asli woman appointed as JAKOA Director-General.

She was formerly Chief of Enforcement Management in the Ministry of Domestic Trade and Consumer Affairs (KPDNHEP). Sapiah and Ramli are also related to Ajis Sitin who was since been appointed to the Dewan Negara.

== See also ==
- Orang asli
