= Amodu Tijani Oluwa =

Nigerian Yoruba traditional chief

Chief Amodu Tijani Oluwa, also known as simply Amodu Tijani, was a Nigerian Yoruba traditional chief. Coming to prominence in the high colonial period, he was a notable nationalist. He held the title of the Oluwa of Lagos.

== Life ==
A member of Lagos' Idejo hereditary nobility, Chief Oluwa was a direct descendant of Olofin Ogunfunmire, the founder of Lagos. His family had dominion over a patchwork of villages and towns in the Apapa area of Lagos.

He held strong nationalist views, arguing that the British colonial government did not have the right to deprive his overlord Eshugbayi Eleko, the Oba of Lagos, of his ancestral powers. To this end, he served as a co-founder of the National Congress of British West Africa.

In 1920, the chief, Prince Adeniji Adele and Herbert Macaulay journeyed to London to appear before the Privy Council. They were there to argue in defense of the Oba's right of ownership to land forcefully appropriated by the British Government. In Amodu Tijani v Secretary, Southern Nigeria, the Council ultimately ruled in their favour. This case proved to be a landmark in Nigerian history as it recognised the chiefs as absolute owners of the land.

Songs and poems were later composed in Chief Oluwa's honour as a result of his success. His case was later referenced in land tenure cases as far afield as India and New Zealand.

== Transcript of the judgement ==
What follows is a link to a summary transcript of the final judgement in the case of Amodu Tijani vs. The Secretary of the Southern Provinces (1921):
