= Lenggeng =

Coordinates: 2°52′N 101°56′E

Lenggeng Longgeng (Negeri Sembilan Malay)
- Mukim
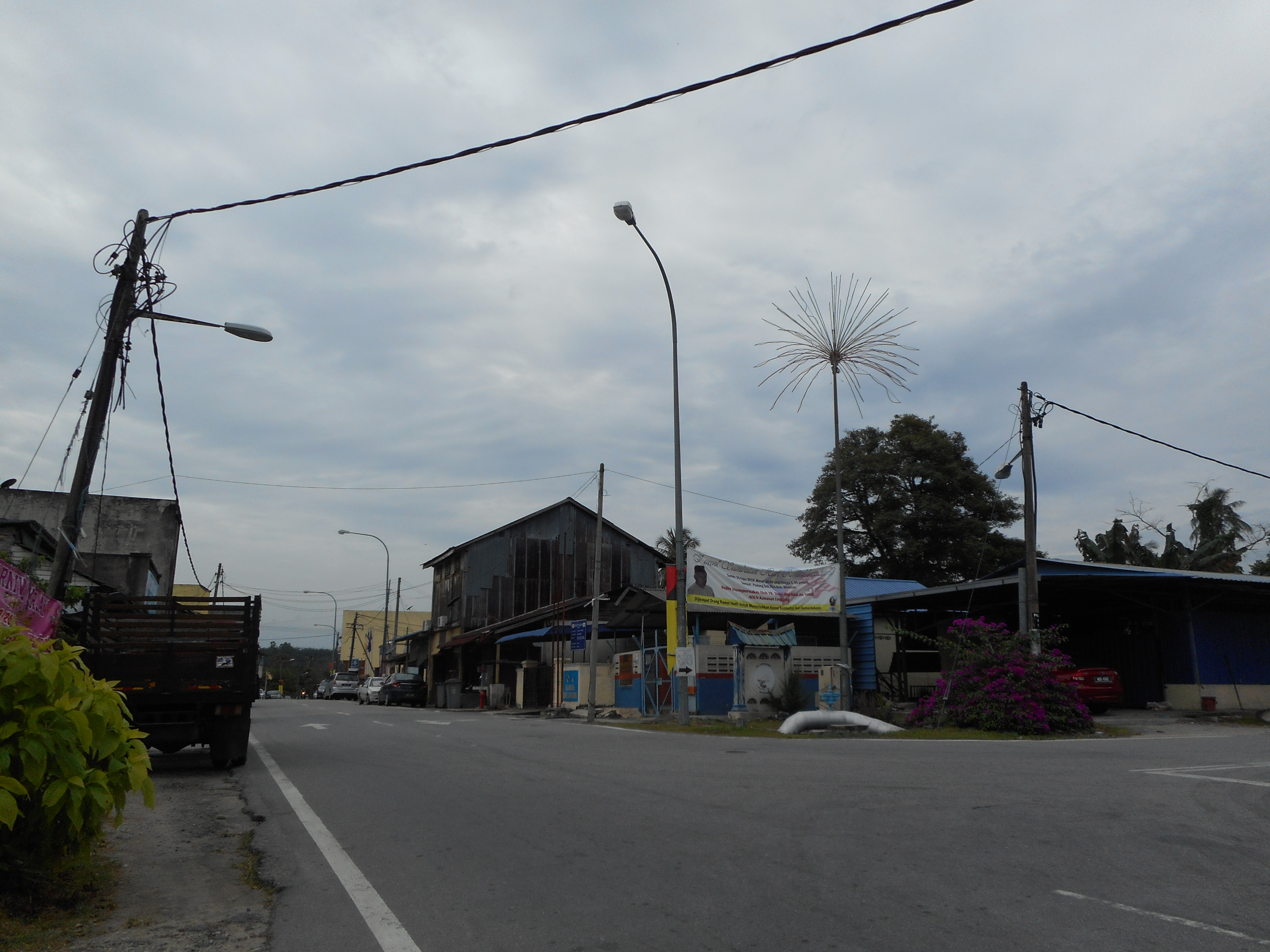

- Lenggeng in Seremban District
- Country: Malaysia
- State: Negeri Sembilan
- District: Seremban
- Luak: Sungai Ujong

Government
  - Body: Seremban City Council
  - Mayor: Masri Baharuddin
  - MP: Anthony Loke (PH–DAP)
  - MLA: Mohd Asna Amin (BN–UMNO)
- Time zone: UTC+8 (MST)
- Postcode: 71750

Lenggeng (Negeri Sembilan Malay: Longgeng; Jawi: لڠڬيڠ) is a hamlet and mukim in Seremban District, Negeri Sembilan, Malaysia, halfway between Mantin and Broga.
