= Temuan language =

Malayan language of Peninsular Malaysia

Temuan
- Bahasak Temuan
- Native to: Malaysia
- Region: central and southern Peninsular Malaysia
- Ethnicity: Temuan
- Native speakers: 23,000 (2008)
- Language family: Austronesian: Malayo-Polynesian; Malayo-Sumbawan; Malayic; Malay?; Temuan
- Dialects: Belandas; Mantra
- Writing system: Latin

Language codes
- ISO 639-3: tmw
- Glottolog: temu1239
- ELP: Temuan

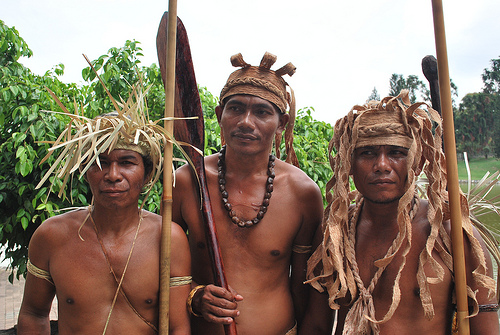
Temuan People

Temuan language (Temuan: Benua, Bual Uwang Hutarn, bual Mutan, Niap, Bahasak Temuan, Malay: Bahasa Temuan) is a Malayic language of the Austronesian language family spoken by the Temuan people, one of the Orang Asli or indigenous peoples of Peninsular Malaysia which can be found in the states of Selangor, Pahang, Johor, Malacca and Negeri Sembilan. Temuan is a separate language but has a degree of mutual intelligibility with the Malay language. It is written in a Latin alphabet, but no standard orthography has been made.

== Phonology ==
Vowels
	Front	Central	Back
Close	i		u
Mid	e	ə	o
Open		a	

/ə/ may be pronounced as [ɐ] in syllable-initial prefixes.

Consonants
		Labial	Alveolar	Palatal	Velar	Glottal
Nasal		m	n	ɲ	ŋ	
Plosive/ Affricate	voiceless	p	t	tʃ	k	(ʔ)
Plosive/ Affricate	voiced	b	d	dʒ	ɡ	
Fricative			s		ɣ	h
Approximant		w	l	j		

The glottal stop [ʔ] is only heard in word-final and intervocalic positions.

/ɣ/ can be heard as [h] when in intervocalic positions. A trill [r] is rarely heard as a pronunciation of /ɣ/.

Nasal sounds /m, n, ŋ/ are heard as preploded [ᵖm, ᵗn, ᵏŋ], when in word-final positions.

== Vocabulary ==
Examples of Temuan words:

English	Malay language	Temuan language
I	Saya/Aku	Akuk
You (casual)	Kau/Awak	Ajih/Ong
You (formal)	Kamu	Higun
They	Mereka/Diorang	Didik/Gidi
Aunty	Makcik/Inang	Inak
Uncle	Pakcik/Mamak	Mamak
Bad	Buruk/Jahat	Barap/Nyap Elok/Nyahat
No/Not	Tak	Nyap
Don't have	Tiada	Hap
Alcohol/Liquor	Arak	Engkem/Aii/Sukuk
Hokkien mee	Mi Jalung	Hokieen Mee
Smoked monkey meat	Daging kera salai	Pantim
Day	Hari	Haik
People	Orang	Uwang/Eang
Tell	Beritahu/Khabar	Kaba

== Dialects ==
Temuan is divided into two major dialects, namely Belandas and Mantra, which differ mostly in terms of phonology and to some extent vocabulary but are still mutually intelligible.

Comparison between Belandas and Mantra dialects:

Sample of Temuan Belandas dialect – diak ('he/she'), hajak ('only'), kitak ('we'), tai (end of sentence particle).

Sample of Temuan Mantra dialect – dien ('he/she'), hajen ('only'), kiten ('we'), tea (end of sentence particle).
