= Cardamomin =

Names
- Preferred IUPAC name 2′,4′-Dihydroxy-6′-methoxychalcone
- Other names (2E)-1-(2,4-Dihydroxy-6-methoxyphenyl)-3-phenyl-2-propen-1-one

Identifiers
CAS Number	19309-14-9 =
3D model (JSmol)	Interactive image
ChEMBL	ChEMBL378104
ChemSpider	557026
ECHA InfoCard	100.189.861
PubChem CID	641785
UNII	H8KP1OJ8JX
CompTox Dashboard (EPA)	DTXSID201029726
- InChI: InChI=1S/C16H14O4/c1-20-15-10-12(17)9-14(19)16(15)13(18)8-7-11-5-3-2-4-6-11/h2-10,17,19H,1H3/b8-7+ Key: NYSZJNUIVUBQMM-BQYQJAHWSA-N; InChI=1/C16H14O4/c1-20-15-10-12(17)9-14(19)16(15)13(18)8-7-11-5-3-2-4-6-11/h2-10,17,19H,1H3/b8-7+ Key: NYSZJNUIVUBQMM-BQYQJAHWBN
- SMILES: COC1=CC(=CC(=C1C(=O)C=CC2=CC=CC=C2)O)O

Properties
Chemical formula	C_{16}H_{14}O_{4}
Molar mass	270.27 g/mol
- Except where otherwise noted, data are given for materials in their standard state (at 25 °C [77 °F], 100 kPa). verify (what is ?) Infobox references

Cardamomin (also known as cardamonin) is a chalconoid that has been isolated from several plants including Alpinia katsumadai and Alpinia conchigera. It has received growing attention from the scientific community due to the expectations toward its benefits to human health.
