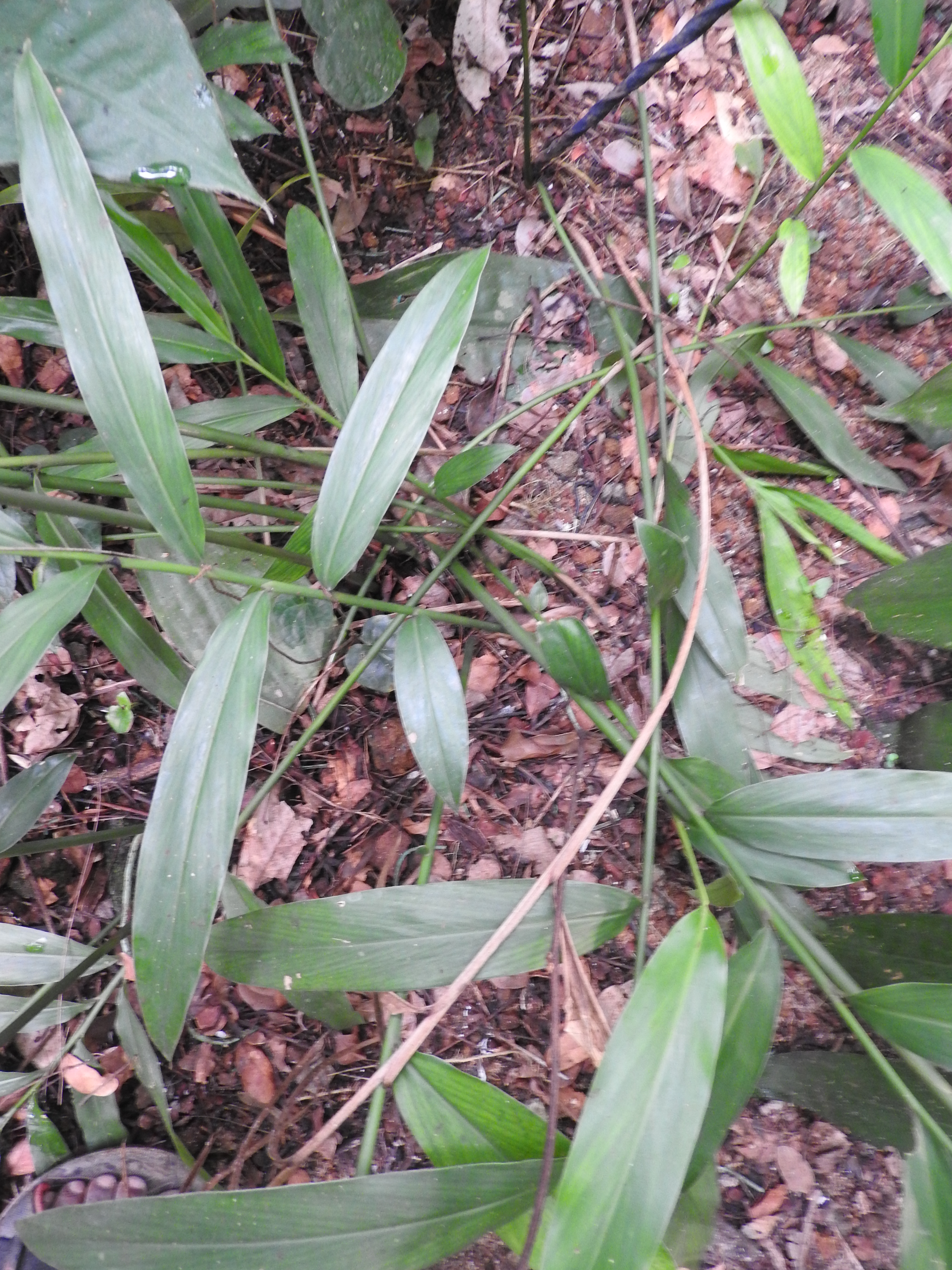
- In Kerala, India

Conservation status
- Least Concern (IUCN 3.1)

Scientific classification
- Kingdom: Plantae
- Clade: Tracheophytes
- Clade: Angiosperms
- Clade: Monocots
- Clade: Commelinids
- Order: Zingiberales
- Family: Zingiberaceae
- Genus: Alpinia
- Species: A. conchigera

Binomial name
- Alpinia conchigera Griff.

Synonyms
- Languas conchigera (Griff.) Burkill; Strobidia conchigera (Griff.) Kuntze; Alpinia humilis Teijsm. & Binn.; Alpinia sumatrana (Miq.) K.Schum.; Languas sumatrana (Miq.) Merr.; Strobidia oligosperma Kuntze; Strobidia sumatrana Miq.

= Alpinia conchigera =

Species of flowering plant

Alpinia conchigera, the lesser alpinia, is a species of flowering plant in the family Zingiberaceae.

Cardamomin is a chalconoid isolated from A. conchigera.
