= Kent McNeil =

Canadian lawyer

Kent McNeil is a Canadian lawyer, currently a Distinguished Research Professor Emeritus and formerly the Robarts Professor of Canadian Studies at York University from 1997 to 1998.
