= Broga =

- Town
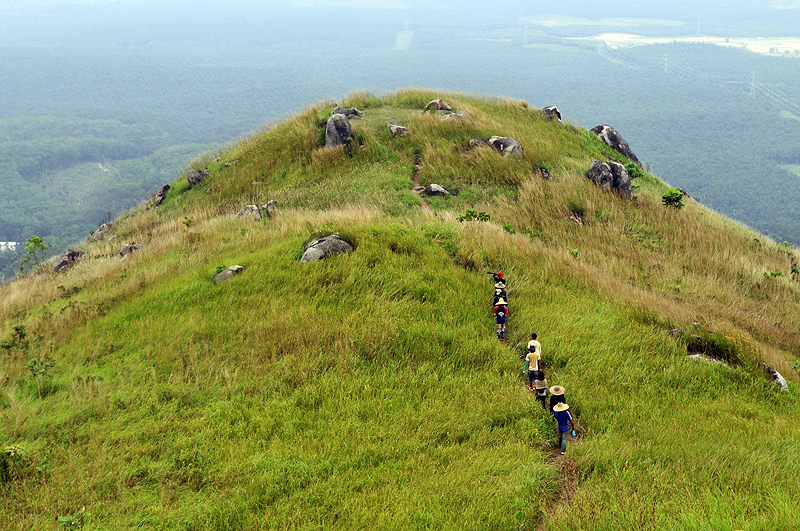
- Broga Hill, a famous landmark in Broga.

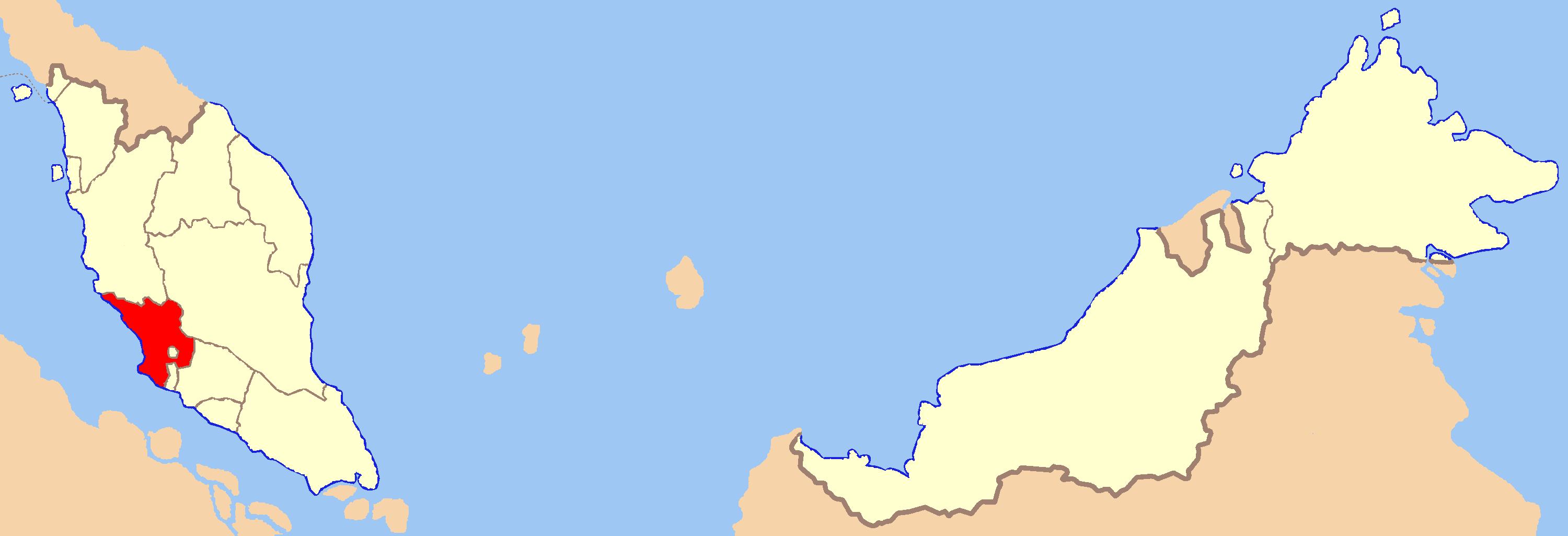
- Location of Selangor within Malaysia

- Location of Broga shown on the border of Negeri Sembilan next to Selangor
- Coordinates: 2°56′14″N 101°54′40″E
- Country: Malaysia
- State: Negeri Sembilan
- District: Seremban
- Luak: Sungai Ujong
- Mukim: Lenggeng

Government
  - Local Authority: Majlis Bandaraya Seremban
  - State Assembly Member: Suhaimi Kassim
- Time zone: UTC+8 (MST)
- Postal code: 71750

Broga is a small town in Lenggeng, Seremban District, Negeri Sembilan, Malaysia. While the town itself lies within Negeri territory, the famed Broga Hill is situated on the Selangorean side.

== History and etymology ==
Broga takes its name from the River Broga which runs through the area. The name Broga is believed to be derived from Buragas, a mythical beast that lives in the forest. Broga was mentioned by Freddie Spencer Chapman in his book, The Jungle is Neutral, to be a location where British-backed rebels fought against the Japanese during World War II.

== Location ==
Broga is unique in that it sits right on the border of both the states of Negeri Sembilan and Selangor. On the Selangorean side, Broga falls within the mukim (sub-district) of Semenyih in the Hulu Langat District. On the Negeri side, it falls within the mukim of Lenggeng which is part of the district of Seremban. The Government Health Clinic and the town football field is located on the Selangorean side of the border and the police station is located on the Negeri side.

== Demographics ==
The majority of those residing in Broga town are the Chinese. There is also a small number of Orang Asli population whose village is located just outside Broga.

=== Religion ===
The Chinese are predominantly Buddhists or Taoists. The Broga Sak Dato Temple (武來岸玉封石哪督廟) is located about 1 km from the Broga town. This Taoist temple is set on a picturesque hillside often frequented by hikers to Broga Hill and has unique statues of the Chinese zodiacal animals. A pedestrian suspension bridge spans the valley besides the temple. A large statue of Sun Wukong sits atop the adjacent hill, gazing across the valley. There are also other temples in Broga town like Soon Yin Kwan Temple (武耒岸順英館).

== Geography ==
Broga sits on the edge of the Titiwangsa Range. Consequently, the town is surrounded by lush green hills of a tropical rainforest, the most prominent of which is Broga Hill.

The hill, approximately 400 m (1,300 ft) in altitude, is notable for its unique appearance as it is rather devoid of trees, which is an uncommon sight amongst the tropical rainforests surrounding the region. Cogongrass typically dominates the summit area. Remnants of burnt out tree trunks indicate that the area may have been ravaged by a forest fire and the trees did not regrow.

Broga Hill is easily climbed by most people due to its aforementioned altitude, becoming a frequent destination for casual hikers. The hilltop offers a good view of the surrounding area and has become a popular picnic and photography spot.

Broga Hill became increasingly well known after some scenes from a local movie Ola Bola were filmed here. Despite the fame, recent developments of the hillside have permanently damaged the unique beauty of this hill.

== Economy ==
Broga is an agricultural town and rubber is its main crop. Despite the shift from rubber to palm oil in many parts of Negeri Sembilan and Selangor, rubber has remained as the most popular crop in Broga. From a sleepy small town, Broga has been transformed by its proximity to the University of Nottingham's campus. The demand for housing and a sizeable student population have brought about rapid development to this area. Broga is also known for its Chinese restaurants and durian orchards.

=== Transport ===
Prior to 2002, there were regular bus services to Broga from Seremban operated by the Foh Hup Omnibus Company. It was a non-profitable route for the company but was operated out of social commitment. Now local buses ferry residents from the nearby Semenyih Sentral.

=== Broga incinerator ===
A 1.5 billion ringgit incinerator was proposed to be built in an area between Semenyih and Broga by the Malaysian federal government in 2001. At the time it would be Asia's largest incinerator and its main purpose was to reduce Kuala Lumpur's dependence on landfills as a means of waste management. In early 2005, a temporary injunction was issued, stopping work on the project, in response to a 2003 lawsuit by residents of the two towns. The project has since been terminated by court decision however the Federal Government stated that the project was aborted because it was too expensive.

== Education ==
A public Chinese Type Primary School is available for the children of Broga. However, for secondary education students would have to attend the Datuk Kelana Public Secondary School in Lenggeng. The University of Nottingham branch campus is located on the Selangor side of the town.

== Gallery ==
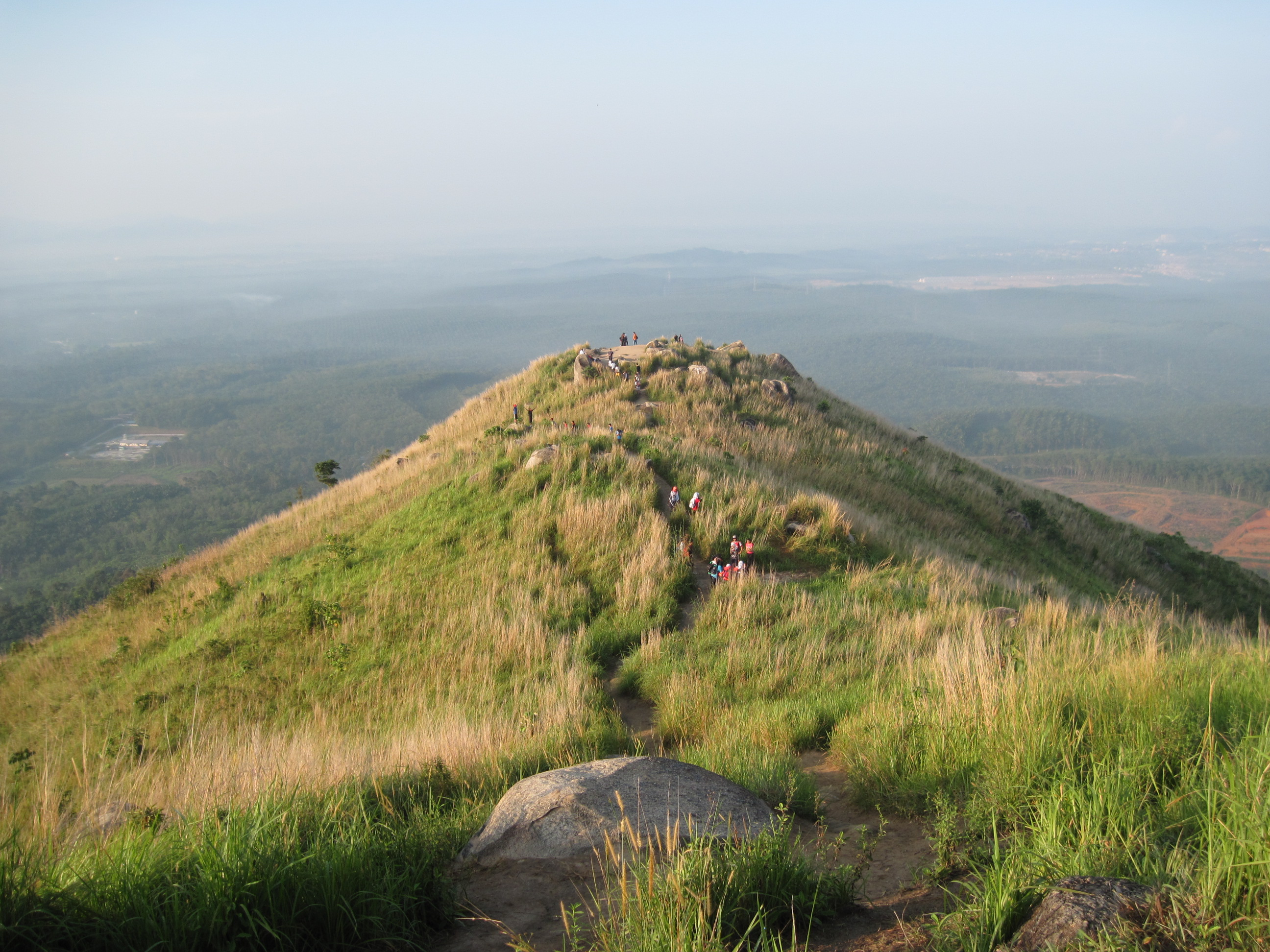

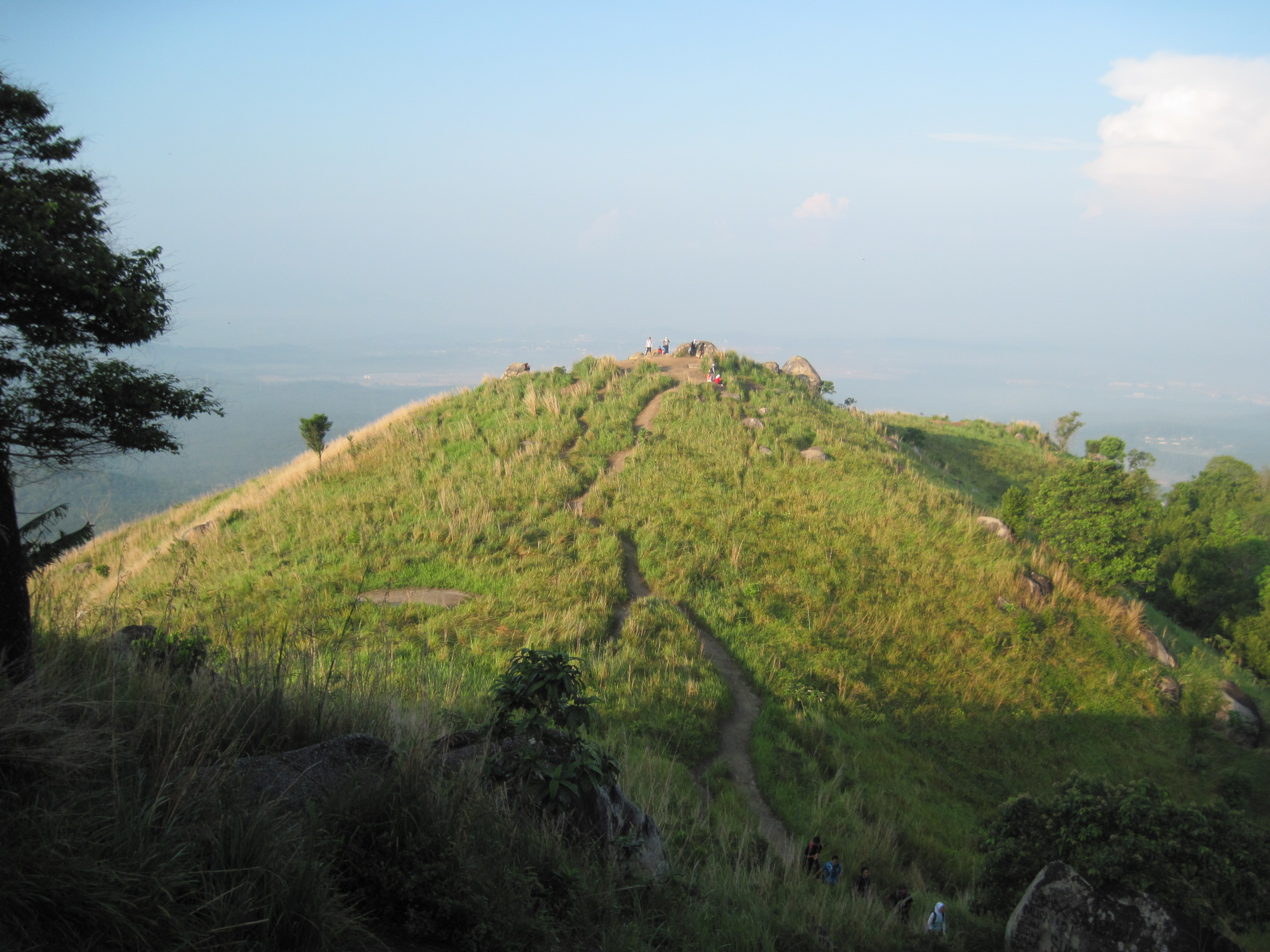

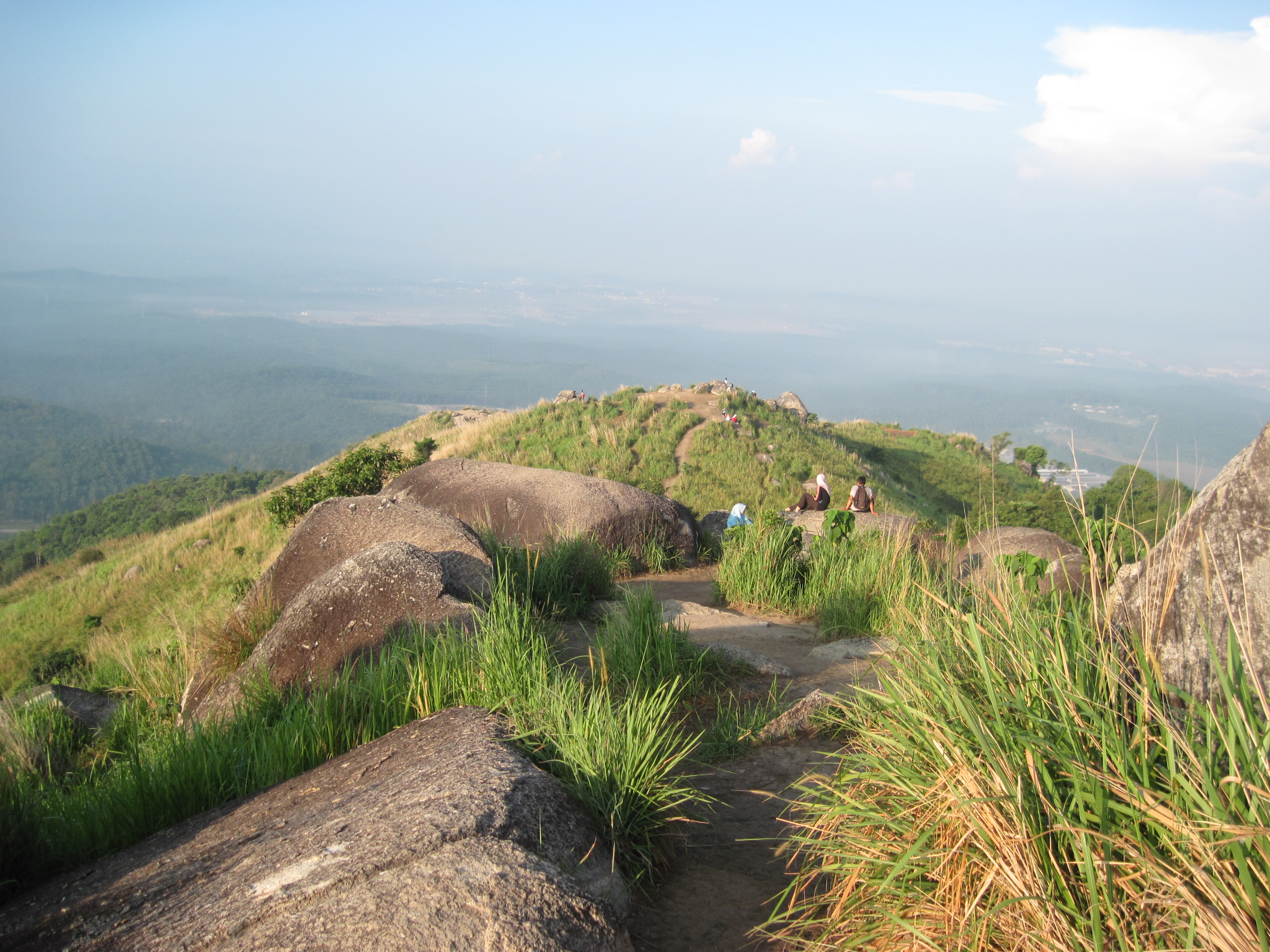

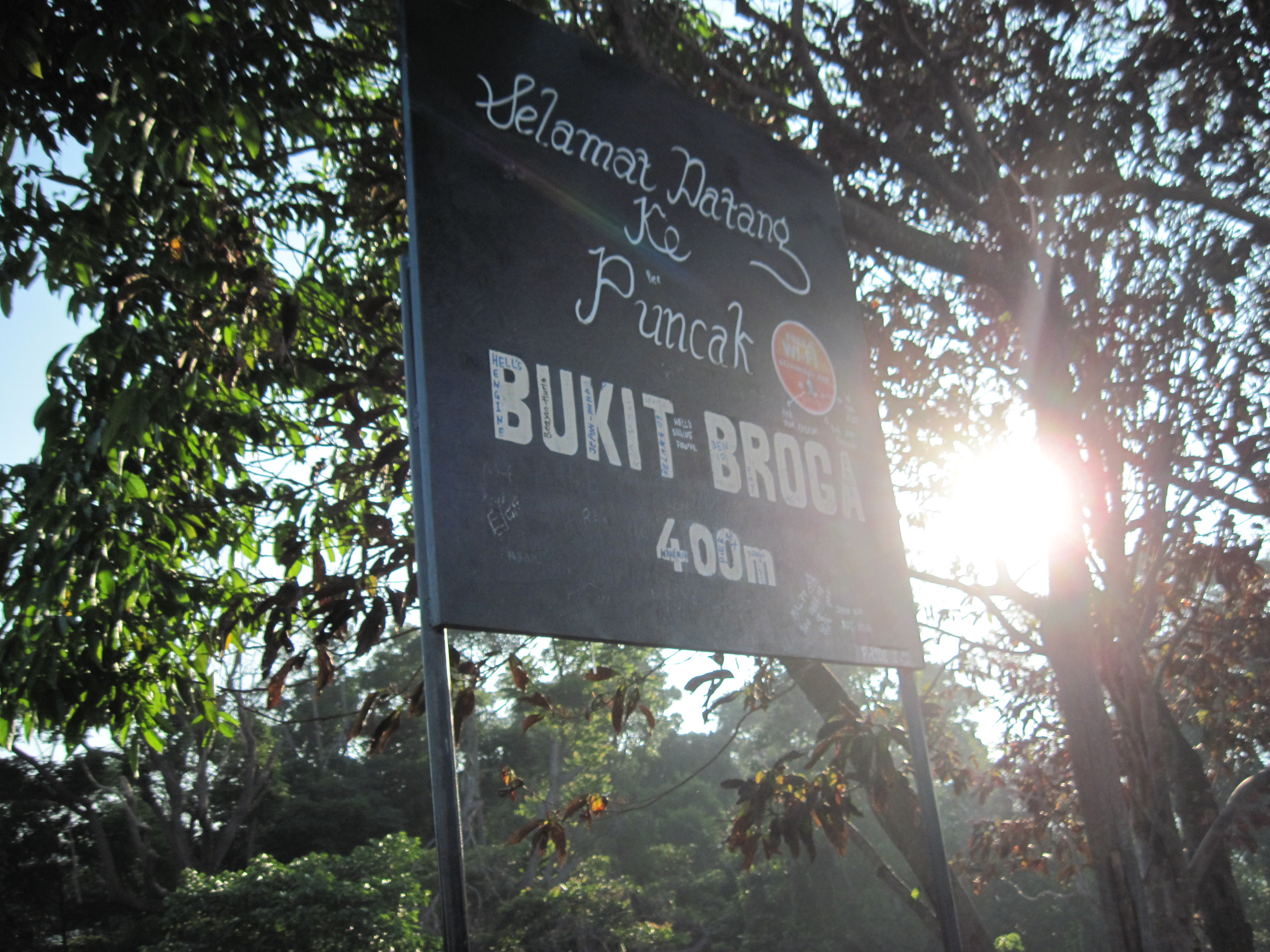

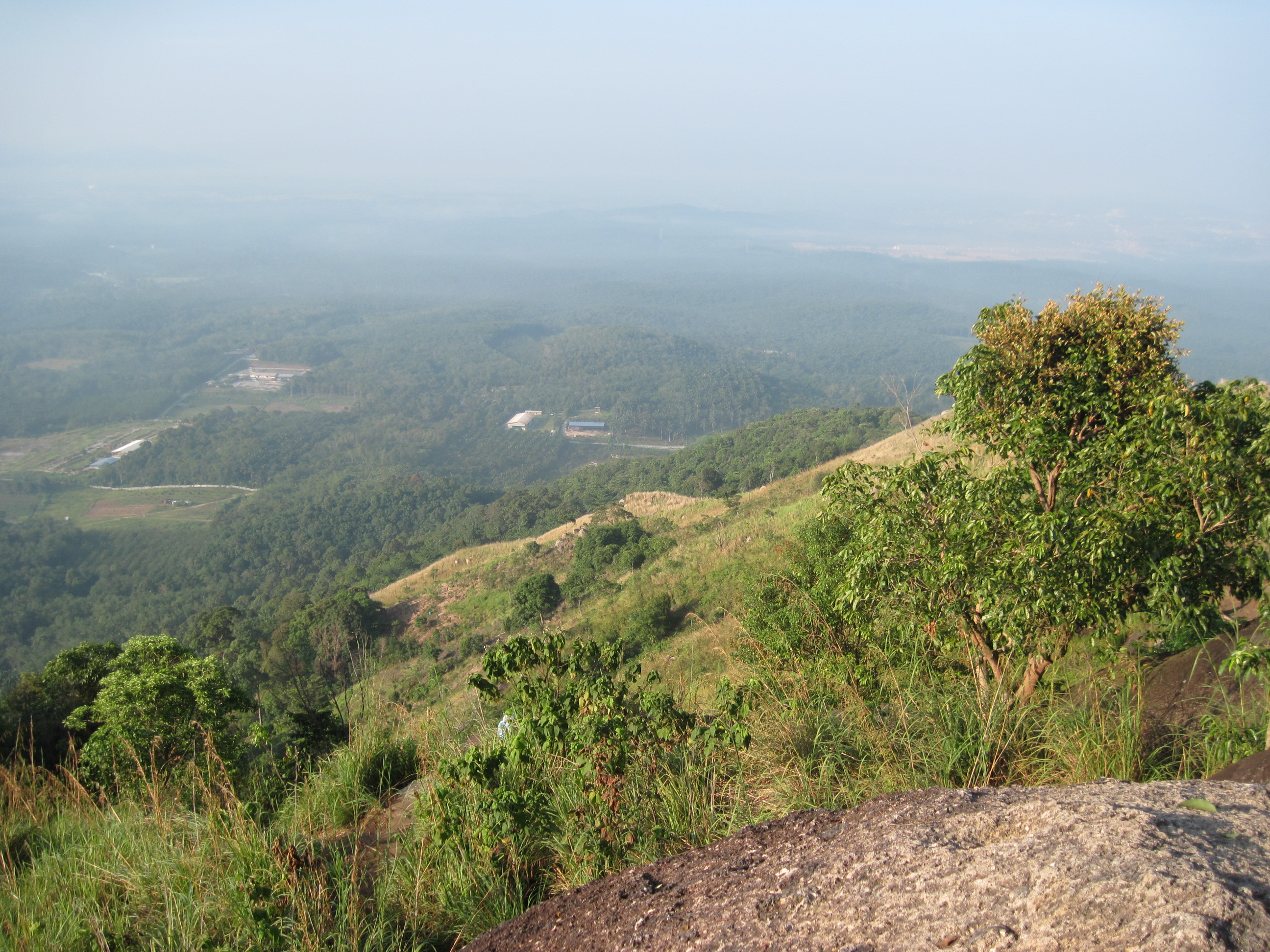

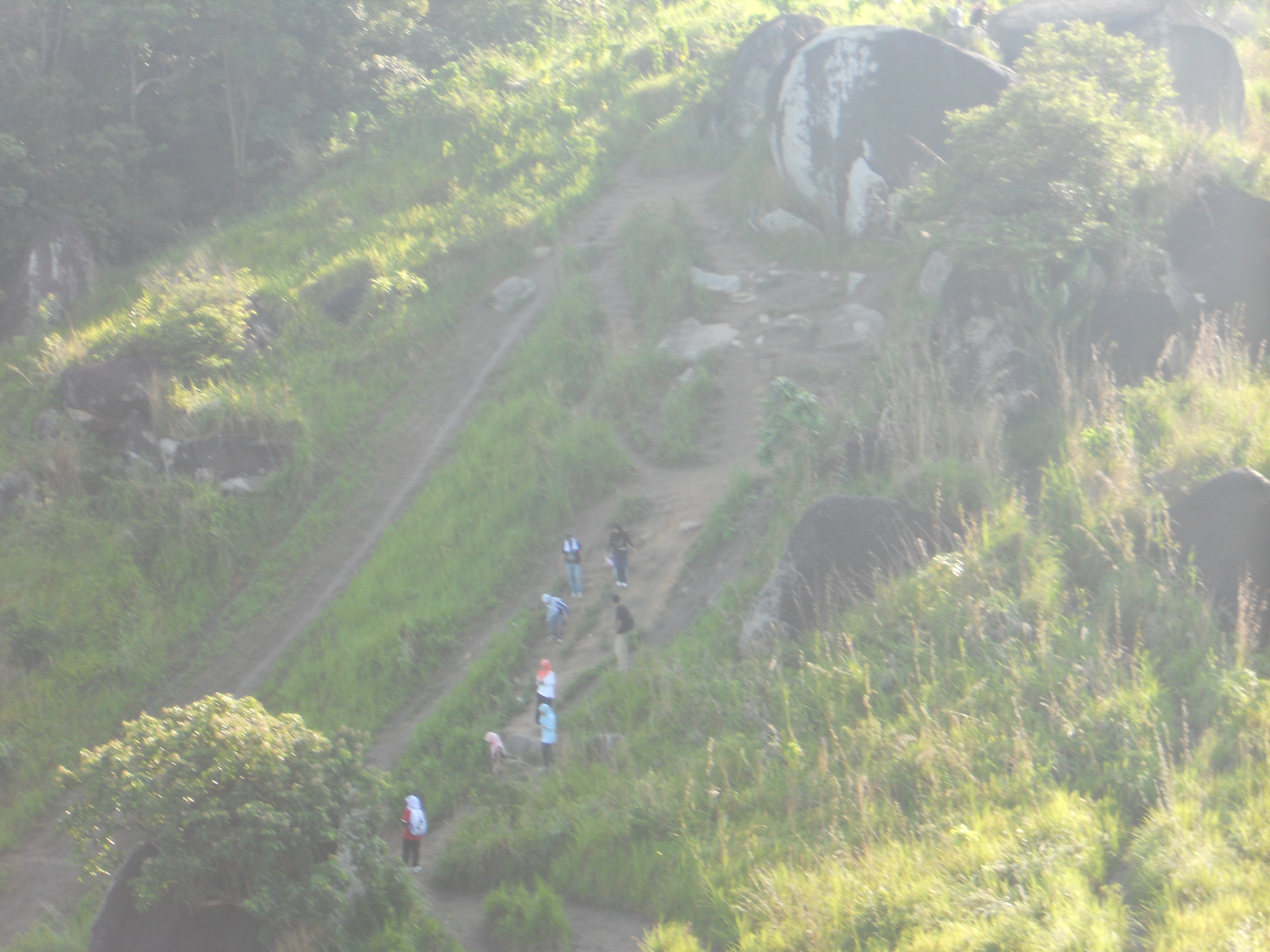

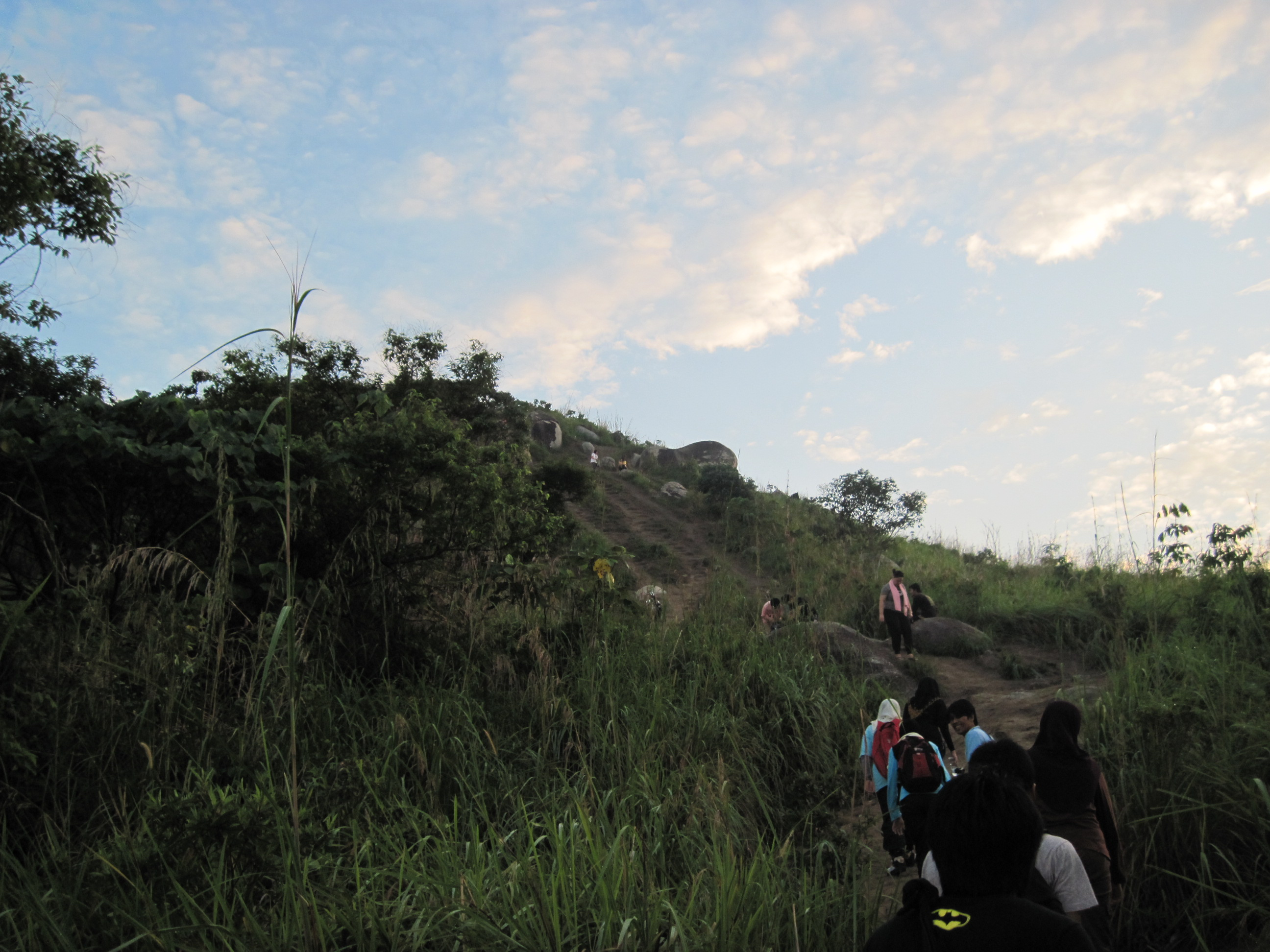

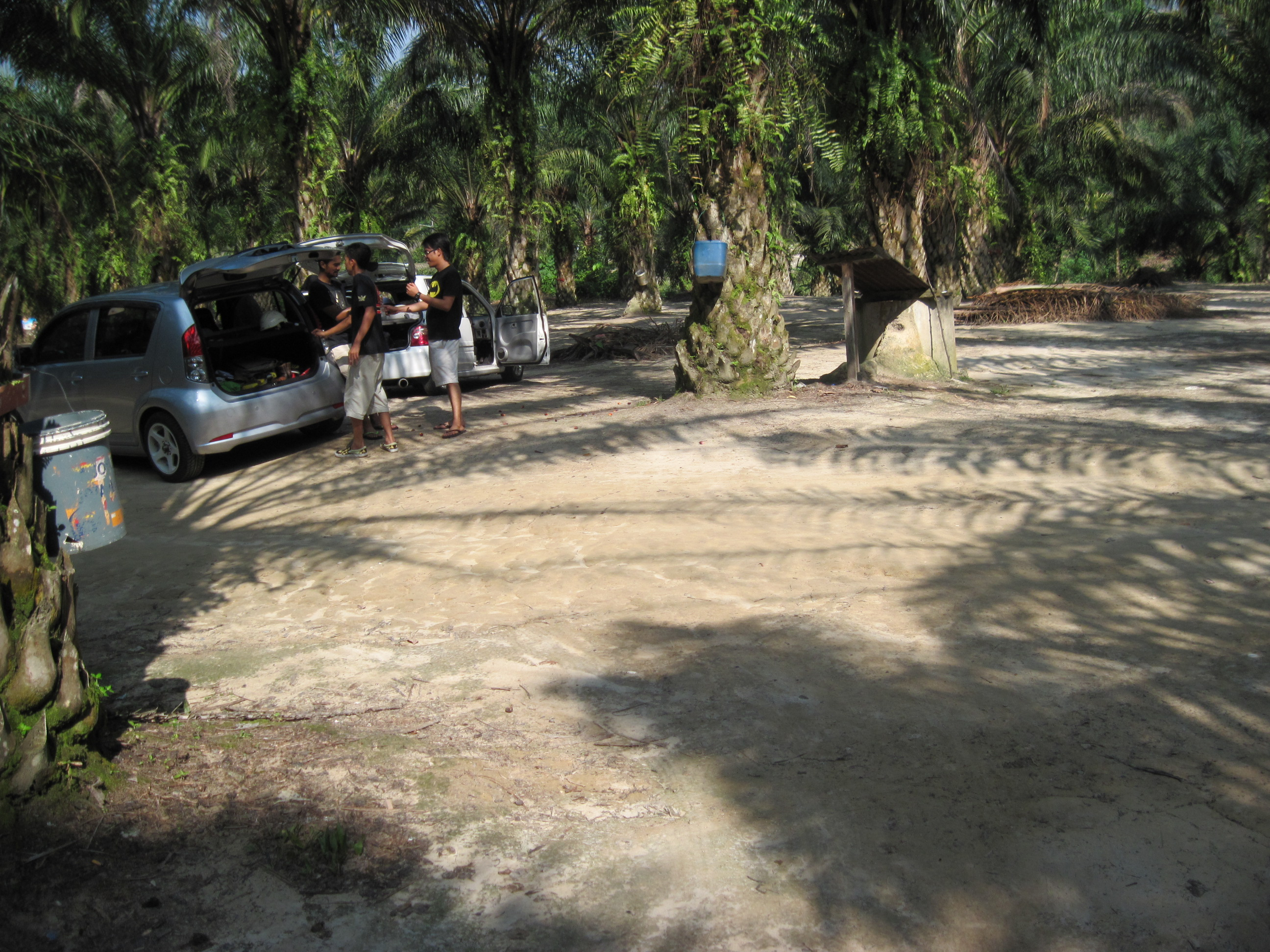

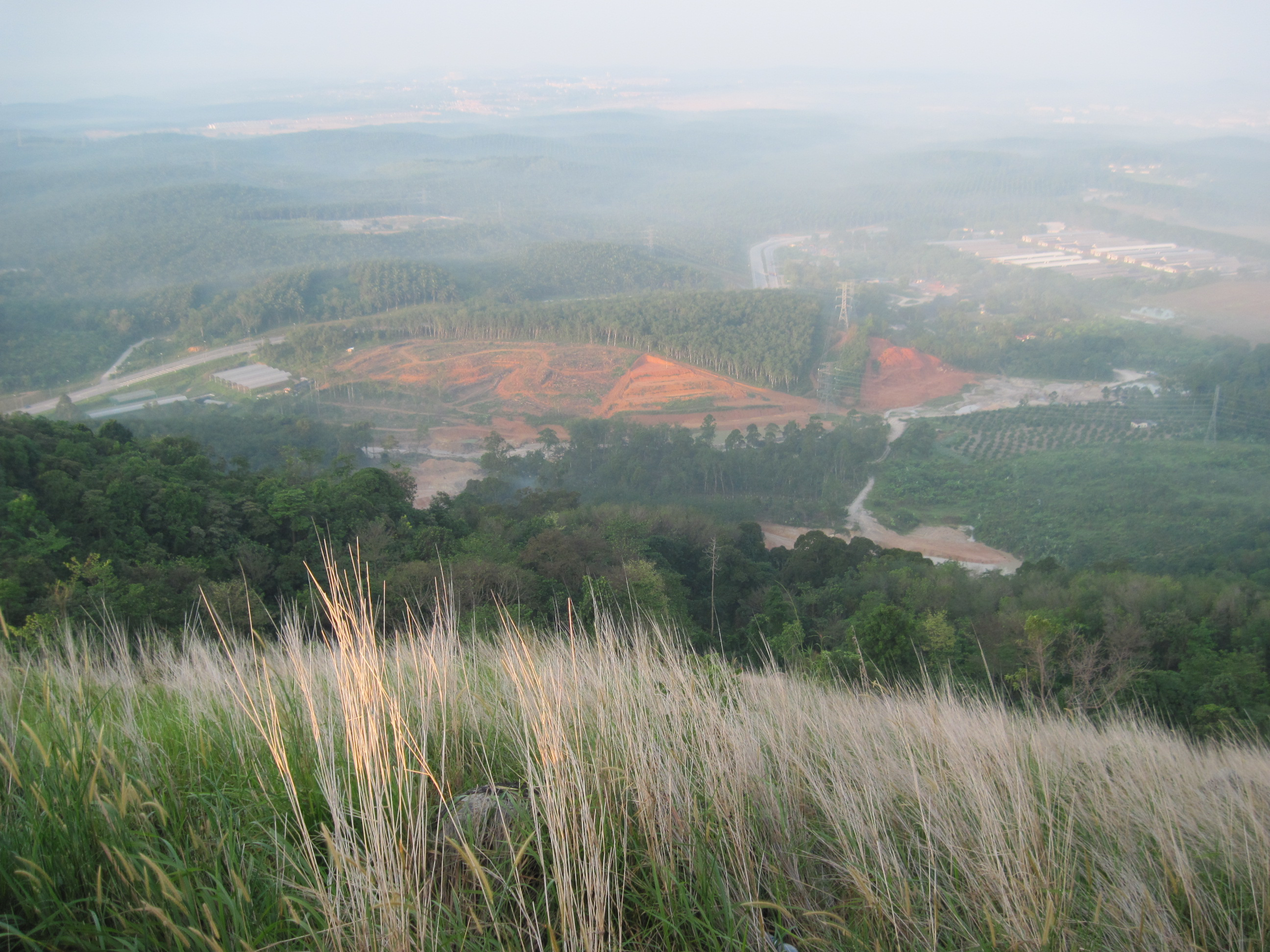
