= Cheq Wong people =

Group of indigenous people of Malaysia

Cheq Wong people Cheqwong / Chewong / Che' Wong / Ceq Wong / Cewong / Si Wong / Siwong / Siwang / Beri / Chuba
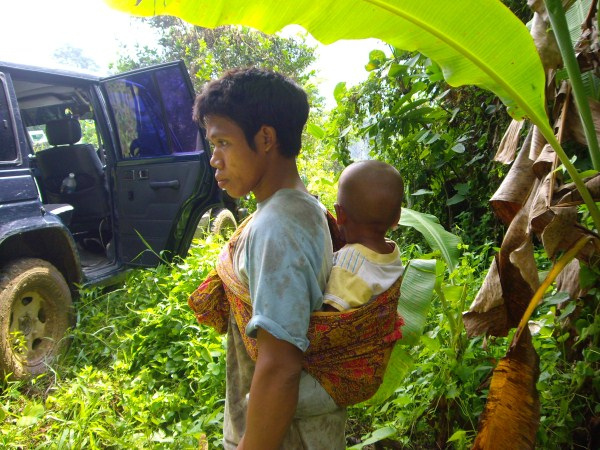
- A Cheq Wong man with a child in Krau Wildlife Reserve, Pahang.

Regions with significant populations
- Malaysia
- Pahang: 818 (2010)

Languages
- Cheq Wong, Malay

Religion
- Animism (predominantly), Islam, Christianity

Related ethnic groups
- Other Jahaic-speaking peoples, other Orang Asli; Especially other Senois

Cheq Wong people are an indigenous Orang Asli people of the Senoi branch in Peninsular Malaysia. Although they have the physical appearance of the Senoi sub-group, the Cheq Wong language that they speak is closely related to the Northern Aslian languages.

== Language ==
Cheq Wong language is part of the Northern Aslian languages. It borrows about 4% of loan words from the Kensiu language, despite these two indigenous peoples being separated by a long distance. However, the Cheq Wong language also has features of a Senoic-type language. High rates of loan words from Southern Aslian languages especially from Semaq Beri language (which was also largely influenced by Northern Aslian languages) indicates that the ancestors of the Cheq Wong people came into contact with Proto-Southern Aslian speakers such as the Semelai people and Temoq people, except the Mah Meri people.

== Settlement area ==
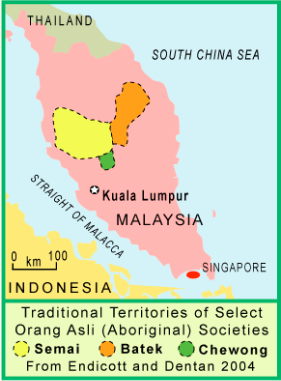
The green area indicates location of the Cheq Wong people in Peninsula Malaysia.

They were originally found in only two areas, namely Krau Wildlife Reserve and Raub District in Pahang. Other Cheq Wong villages are also found in areas including Temerloh and Jerantut District in Pahang.

Recent developments have caused the settlement areas of the Cheq Wong people to be exposed to the outside world via logging, roads and an elephant sanctuary for tourism. Some of these developments have led to flooding and pollution of river in their area.

== Population ==
The population change of the Cheq Wong people in Malaysia:-

Year	1960	1965	1969	1974	1980	1982	1996	2000	2003	2004	2010
Population	182	268	272	215	203	250	403	234	664	564	818

== History ==
During World War II, many of the Cheq Wong people were killed by the Japanese army, which is one of the factors that led to the small population of the Cheq Wong people today. During the war, the Malayan Communist Party sought help from them in the Communists' fight against the Japanese army. After the war ended, the Cheq Wong people's homelands were declared a "black area" due to the presence of the Malayan Communist Party rebels during the Malayan Emergency. The government then informed the Orang Asli out of fear that they were helping the communist rebels. Many Cheq Wong were killed by the Communist rebels who suspected them of helping the government, while some were also attacked by the government military who thought that they were helping the Communist rebels.

== Religion ==
The Cheq Wong people traditionally adhere to a form of animism that makes a distinction between species that possess ruwai (meaning "soul" or "consciousness") and those that do not. There is even a shamanic song that refers to the Japanese war planes flying over the jungle during World War II as ruwai.

Similar to the Semaq Beri people's talan and the Temuan people's celau, the Cheq Wong people have a sacred law called talaiden, where any form of transgression including even laughing or teasing committed against any animals is forbidden. Such offenses result in the punishment of the storm (or snake) talaiden, where storms, rain and thunder will be sent as a form of punishment. Another form of talaiden that the Cheq Wong people believe is the tiger talaiden, where an incorrect mixing of foods or things will result with the offender being attacked by a tiger.

== Culture ==
The Cheq Wong people are regarded as one of the peaceful and non-violent groups among the Orang Asli. They have a proverb that says, "To be angry is not human; but to be fearful is." The saying underlines the Cheq Wong belief in avoiding conflicts and fleeing from dangers as a natural defensive measure.

Cheq Wong people practice a form of simple shifting cultivation, as well as hunting-gathering. They are also known for making blowguns and using them for hunting. However the art of making blowguns is threatened as people now go to the market for meat and no longer need to hunt as frequently as before. They also practice a traditional form of agroforestry by cultivating fruit orchards among existing tree species with minimal damage to the jungle, unlike palm oil estates or commercial fruit orchards. This method of cultivation has positive impact on the ecosystem by enriching the variety of flora and providing food for the fauna.
