= Cheq Wong =

Cheq Wong may refer to:

- Cheq Wong language, a language of the Jahaic languages branch spoken in Malaysia
- Cheq Wong people, an indigenous Orang Asli people from Malaysia
