= Semaq Beri =

Semaq Beri may refer to:

- Semaq Beri language
- Semaq Beri people
