= Temoq =

Temoq can refer to:

- Temoq people, an Orang Asli group of people from Peninsula Malaysia.
- Temoq language, the language spoken by the Temoq people.
