= Mah Meri =

Mah Meri may refer to:

- Mah Meri people
- Mah Meri language
