= Semaq Beri people =

Semaq Bri / Semoq Beri

Total population
- 2,400 (2014)

Regions with significant populations
- Malaysia (Pahang and Terengganu)

Languages
- Semaq Beri language, Malay language

Religion
- Animism (predominantly), Islam, Christianity

Related ethnic groups
- Semelai people, Mah Meri people, Temoq people

Semaq Beri or Semoq Beri people are the native Orang Asli people belonging to the Senoi branch, who live in the states of Pahang and Terengganu in peninsular Malaysia. The Semaq Beri language is a language spoken by the people, is an Austroasiatic language that belongs to the Southern grouping of the branch of Aslian languages.

== Population ==
The dynamics of the Semaq Beri population are as the following:

Historical population

Year	Pop.	±%
1960	1,230	—
1965	1,418	+15.3%
1969	1,406	−0.8%
1974	1,699	+20.8%

Year	Pop.	±%
1980	1,746	+2.8%
1993	2,488	+42.5%
1996	2,488	+0.0%
2000	2,348	−5.6%

Year	Pop.	±%
2003	3,545	+51.0%
2004	3,345	−5.6%
2010	3,413	+2.0%
2014	2,400	−29.7%

== Religion ==
The religious system of the Semaq Beri people is similar to other surrounding Orang Asli groups. They believe that human acts such as teasing or laughing at animals such as monkeys, dogs, cats, land leeches, porcupines, two kinds or birds and three kinds of snakes, and including incest that extends to certain relatives are strictly prohibited and are also considered as talon. By committing talan, the Semoq Beri believe that it will cause a cosmic disaster where the earth will be swallowed by massive waters crashing from heaven and welling up from under the ground. Lately, there are numbers of Semaq Beri communities that have been Islamised through various programmes by government efforts.

== Lifestyle ==
There are those among the Semaq Beri people that are nomadic practices hunter-gathering for a living, while there are those that are semi-nomadic practices some farming with shifting cultivation, and those that are settled primarily relies on farming. Generally women would do much of the gathering while the men would do the hunting, unless women that are not pregnant or nursing a child would also participate in the hunting. While generally mothers spend more time with their children, there is almost no distinguishing in the role of fathers and mothers in society when it comes to holding and caring for the child. Apart from hunting and gathering, the Semaq Beri people also relies on logging roads for access to sell rattan.
