= Mah Meri language =

Austroasiatic language spoken in Malaysia

Mah Meri
- Besisi, Betiseʼ
- Native to: Malaysia
- Region: Malay Peninsula
- Ethnicity: Mah Meri
- Native speakers: 3,700 (2008)
- Language family: Austroasiatic: Aslian; Southern; Mah Meri

Language codes
- ISO 639-3: mhe
- Glottolog: besi1244
- ELP: Mah Meri

Mah Meri, also known as Besisi, Cellate, Hmaʼ Btsisiʼ, Maʼ Betisek, and pejoratively as Orang Sabat, is an Austroasiatic language spoken in the Malay Peninsula. Along with Semaq Beri, Semelai and Temoq, Mah Meri belongs to the Southern Aslian branch of the Aslian languages. Mah Meri is the only remaining Aslian language spoken in a coastal area (on the coasts of Negeri Sembilan and Selangor) and its speaker population is 3,675 as recorded at the Orang Asli Museum in Gombak. A dictionary of the Mah Meri language has been compiled by Nicole Kruspe.

== Phonology ==
=== Vowels ===
Register 1 vowels
	Front	Central	Back	
	Front	Central	-round	+round
High	i ĩ	ɨ̞	ɯ ɯ̃	u ũ
Mid High	e ẽ	ə ә̃		o õ
Mid Low	ɛ ɛ̃			ɔ ɔ̃
Low		a ã		

Register 2 vowels
	Front	Central	Back	
	Front	Central	-round	+round
High	i̤		ɯ̤	ṳ
Mid High	e̤	ə̤		o̤
Mid Low	ɛ̤			ɔ̤
Low		a̤		

=== Voice register ===
There are two voice registers in Mah Meri:
Register 1: Register 1 vowels have a clear tense voice quality, shorter duration and lower pitch. Register 1 vowels also have fewer phonotactic restrictions.
Register 2: Register 2 vowels are laxer, longer and higher in pitch. Register 2 vowels also have a slight breathy voicing.

=== Consonants ===
	Labial	Denti- alveolar	Alveolar	Palatal	Velar	Glottal
Plosive	p b	t	d		k g	ʔ
Plosive	pʰ	tʰ			kʰ	
Nasal	m̥ m		n̥ n	ɲ̊ ɲ	ŋ̊ ŋ	
Tap			ɾ			
Fricative			s			h
Affricate				tɕ dʑ		
Affricate				tɕʰ		
Approximant	ʍ w			j	ɰ	
Lateral Approximant			l̥ l			

== Grammar ==
=== Syntax ===
In Mah Meri, modifiers and demonstratives occur after the head as shown in examples (1) and (2) while prepositions occur before the head as shown in example (3).

dṳk naleʔ
house old
'old house'

ləmɔl horoʔ ke
man old that
'that old man'

haʔ mbəri
LOC forest
'in the forest'

For transitive clauses, Mah Meri generally follows an Agent-Verb-Object (AVO) order as shown in example (4), but a Verb-Agent-Object (VAO) order is more common during natural discourse as shown in example (5).

hŋkiʔ tomboʔ ləmɔl ke
3 punch man that
'He punched that man.'

ləpas ke nɔŋ, ʔeʔə̤t kədeʔ, kaye hŋkiʔ ʔeʔə̤t
after that PST:PROX 1SG hide see 3 1SG
'After that, I hid, (lest) he see me.'

For intransitive clauses in Mah Meri, both Subject-Verb (SV) and Verb-Subject (VS) orders are possible as shown in examples (6) and (7) respectively.

ʔeʔə̤t nimbol bawaw nɔŋ
lSG come.from sea PST:PROX
'I came from the sea just now.'

lɛp do haʔ tə̤k
enter water LOC ear
'Water got into (my) ear.'

=== Morphology ===
Morphology in Mah Meri is exclusively through prefixation and infixation.

==== Semi-productive derivations ====
1. Detransitivizing N- 'DTR'

The prefix n- is attached to monosyllabic verbs and the vowel from the final syllable is reduplicated into the vowel position.
Example: bɛ 'to do' → nɛ-bɛ 'doing, doer'
For disyllabic verbs, the initial consonant is replaced by a homorganic nasal.
Example: plət 'to extinguish' → m:əlɘt 'extinguishing'

2. Transitive focus ka- 'TR'

The prefix ka- only applies to indigenous monosyllabic verbs.
Example: jɛt 'to follow' → ka-jɛt 'to follow someone or something', cɔʔ 'to go' → ka-cɔʔ 'to go to someone or a place'

3. Distributive < l > 'DISTR'

The infix < l > applies to disyllabic intransitive verbs of position or state and also some verbs of motion.
The infix is inserted into the initial syllable and a schwa replaces to well to correct syllable structure.
Example: kancɛw 'to be naked' → kəlancɛw 'many naked (people)'.
If the penultimate syllable CV is a palatal stop plus schwa, the < la > infix is applied instead.
Example: jəkəʔ 'to sit motionless' → jə-la-kəʔ 'many sitting motionless'

==== Regular productive derivations ====
===== Iterative sə-RDP-root 'ITER' =====
The prefix sə- is attached to the initial constituent of reduplicated bases to express iteration. Example:

sə-nake-nake
ITER-REDUP-that
'that one over and over again'

===== Happenstance tə- 'happ' =====
The prefix tə- expresses:

- an inadvertent event
- ability or inability when used in a negated clause.

Example: tə-ka-ca 'happen to eat'

===== Middle voice bə- 'MID' =====
The prefix bə- is applied to either verbal or nominal roots to express an attributive or possessive function. Example: bə-dṳk 'having a house'

== Language endangerment and vitality ==
According to Ethnologue, the language status of Mah Meri is '6b: Threatened', referring to the situation whereby the language is used for face-to-face communications within all generations, but is losing users. This status is based on Lewis and Smino's (2010) Expanded Graded Intergenerational Disruption Scale (EGIDS).

A study by Coluzzi, Riget & Wang (2017) on language use and attitudes across 4 different Mah Meri villages on Carey Island suggests that while Mah Meri still holds a strong and positive status in the community, there is a possibility of a complete language shift towards Malay in the future due to lesser usage of Mah Meri amongst the younger generation.
