= Temoq people =

Ethnic group of Malaysia

Total population
- Less than 100 (2010)

Regions with significant populations
- Malaysia (Pahang)

Languages
- Temoq language, Malay language

Religion
- Perman (Ethnic religion)

Related ethnic groups
- Semelai people, Jakun people

Temoq people belong to the Proto-Malay of the Orang Asli ethnic group that are found in Pahang, Malaysia.

== Settlement area ==
The Temoq people that are officially recognized are known to settle in two kampungs; on the eastern side of Tasik Bera and on the southern side of Tasik Chini, in between the settlements of the Jakun people and the Semelai people.

== Population ==
The dynamics of the Temoq population are as the following:-

| Year | 1960 | 1965 | 1969 | 1974 | 1980 | 1996 | 2010 |
| Population | 51 | 52 | 100 | N/A | N/A | N/A | Less than 100 |

Due to their small population, they have been declared extinct several times by the government by simply absorbing them into other neighbouring Orang Asli groups such as the Jakun people in 1974, 1980 and 1996, and with the Semelai people in 2010 for census and administrative purposes.

== Origins ==
There are two versions on the origins of the Temoq people:-

- The Jakun narrative identifies the Temoq people were once part of the Jakun people.
- The Semelai narrative are slightly different from the Jakun's version, but the Semelai people (who practices circumcision) uses the Semaq Beri people and Temoq people as an alternative reference to Orang Asli unlike the Jakun people who do not. The Semelai people regard the Temoq people as the original inhabitants of Tasik Bera.

== Language ==
The language of the Temoq and Semelai people are of the Austroasiatic languages family, which is different from the Malayic languages of the Austronesian languages family. Generally Malay language is frequently used along with Semelai language among the western Temoq people, while Jakun language with the eastern Temoq people although they still know Temoq language.

== Lifestyle ==
The Temoq people practice ownership of properties at the individual level. Their main sources of income include agriculture, fishing and hunting.
