= Temoq language =

Austroasiatic language spoken in Malaysia

Temoq
- Native to: Malaysia
- Region: Malaya
- Ethnicity: Temoq
- Native speakers: unknown
- Language family: Austroasiatic: Aslian; Southern; Temoq

Language codes
- ISO 639-3: tmo
- Glottolog: temo1243
- ELP: Temoq

Temoq is a severely endangered Austroasiatic language spoken in the state of Pahang in the Malay Peninsula. Temoq belongs to the Southern branch of the Aslian languages, along with Semelai, Semaq Beri, and Mah Meri.

== Sources ==
- Collings, H. D. (1949). "A Tĕmoq Word List and Notes" (PDF). Bulletin of the Raffles Museum. Series B (4): 69–85.
