= Bera Lake =

Natural freshwater lake system in Pahang, Malaysia

- Location within Malaysia
- Location: Bera, Pahang, Malaysia
- Coordinates: 3°5′15″N 102°36′55″E
- Primary outflows: Pahang River
- Basin countries: Malaysia
- Max. length: 35 km (22 mi)
- Max. width: 20 km (12 mi)

Ramsar Wetland
- Official name: Tasek Bera
- Designated: 10 November 1994
- Reference no.: 712

Bera Lake (Malay: Tasek Bera or Tasik Bera; Chinese: 比拉湖) is a natural freshwater lake system, located in Bera District, Pahang, Malaysia in the saddle of the main and eastern mountain ranges of Peninsular Malaysia, extending 35 km long and 20 km wide, draining into the Pahang River. It lends its name to the Bera district and parliamentary constituency.

As the largest freshwater swamp in Peninsular Malaysia, Tasik Bera or Bera Lake remains both a unique and remote wetland wilderness. Surrounded by a patchwork of dry lowland dipterocarp forests, the lake environment includes islands of peat swamp forests. Rich in wildlife and vegetation, the ecosystem which supports a diversity of animal and plant life, and sustains the livelihood of the Semelai branch of the Orang Asli people inhabiting the wetlands.

It has been protected under the Ramsar Convention since November 1994, which allows traditional use of the area to continue. The core zone consists of 260 km² and the buffer zone of 275 km².
