= Orang Asli Museum =

Museum in Gombak, Selangor, Malaysia

Coordinates: 3.266619°N 101.727605°E

- Muzium Orang Asli
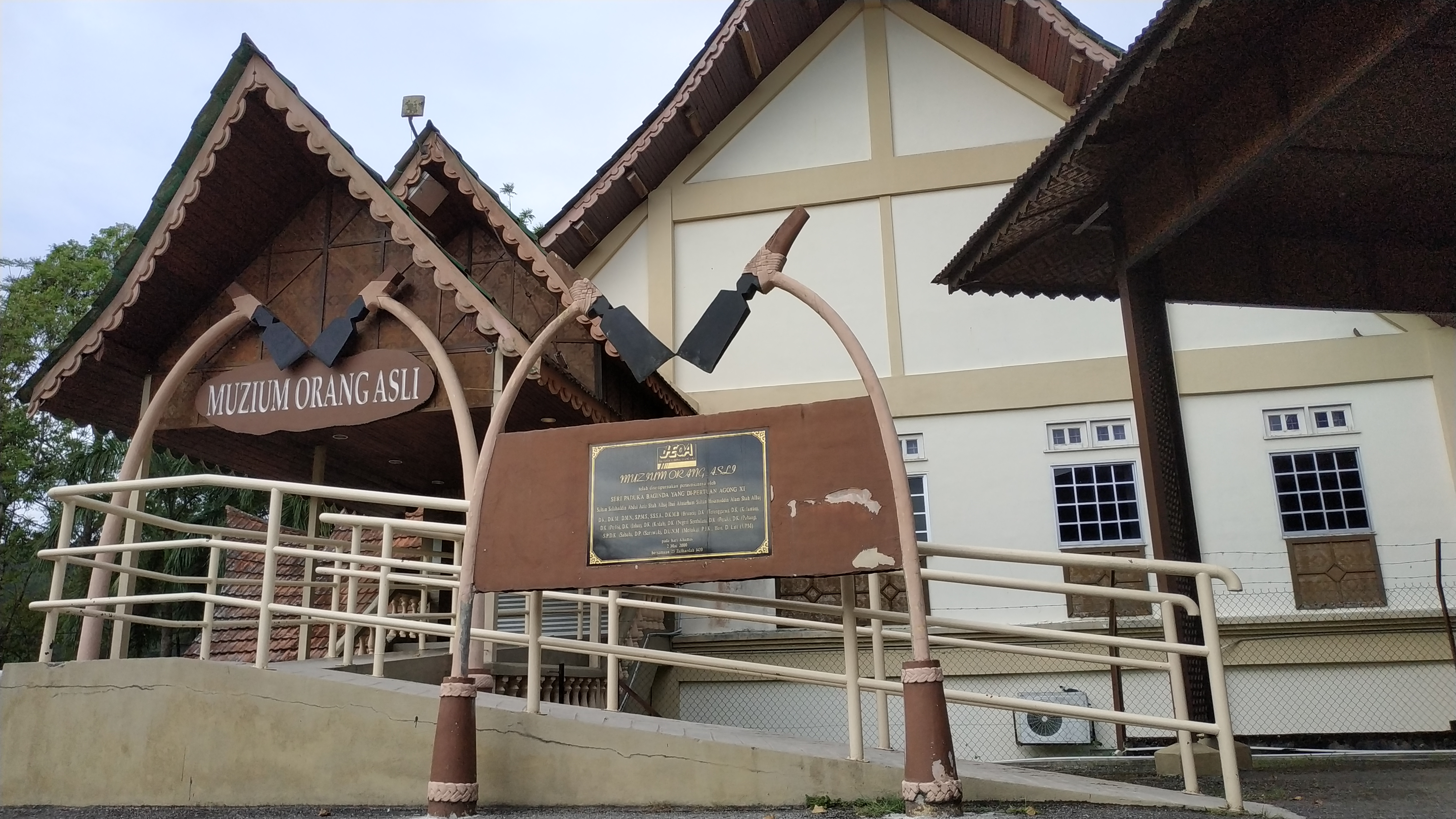
- Interactive map of the Orang Asli Museum area

General information
- Type: Museum
- Location: Gombak, Selangor, Malaysia
- Opening: 29 September 1987
- Operator: Department of Orang Asli Development (JAKOA)

The Orang Asli Museum (Malay: Muzium Orang Asli) is a museum in Gombak, Selangor, Malaysia that showcases the history and tradition of the indigenous Orang Asli people. It includes a library and a small theater hall, and was opened on 29 September 1987 by Prime Minister Mahathir Mohamad.

== See also ==
- List of museums in Malaysia
