= Cheq Wong language =

Austroasiatic language spoken in Malaysia

Cheq Wong
- Ceq Wong, Chewong
- Native to: Malaysia
- Region: Peninsular Malaysia
- Native speakers: 460 (2008)
- Language family: Austroasiatic: Aslian; Jahaic; Cheq Wong

Language codes
- ISO 639-3: cwg
- Glottolog: chew1245
- ELP: Chewong

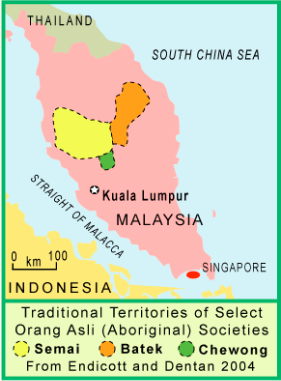
An ethnographic map of the Malay Peninsula showing where the Cheq Wong people live (in green).

Cheq Wong (Ceq Wong, Chewong) is an Austroasiatic language spoken in the Malay Peninsula by the Cheq Wong people. It belongs to the Northern subbranch of the Aslian languages. Northern Aslian was labelled Jehaic in the past.
