= Semelai people =

Semelai
Semaq Semelai (smaʔ səməlay)
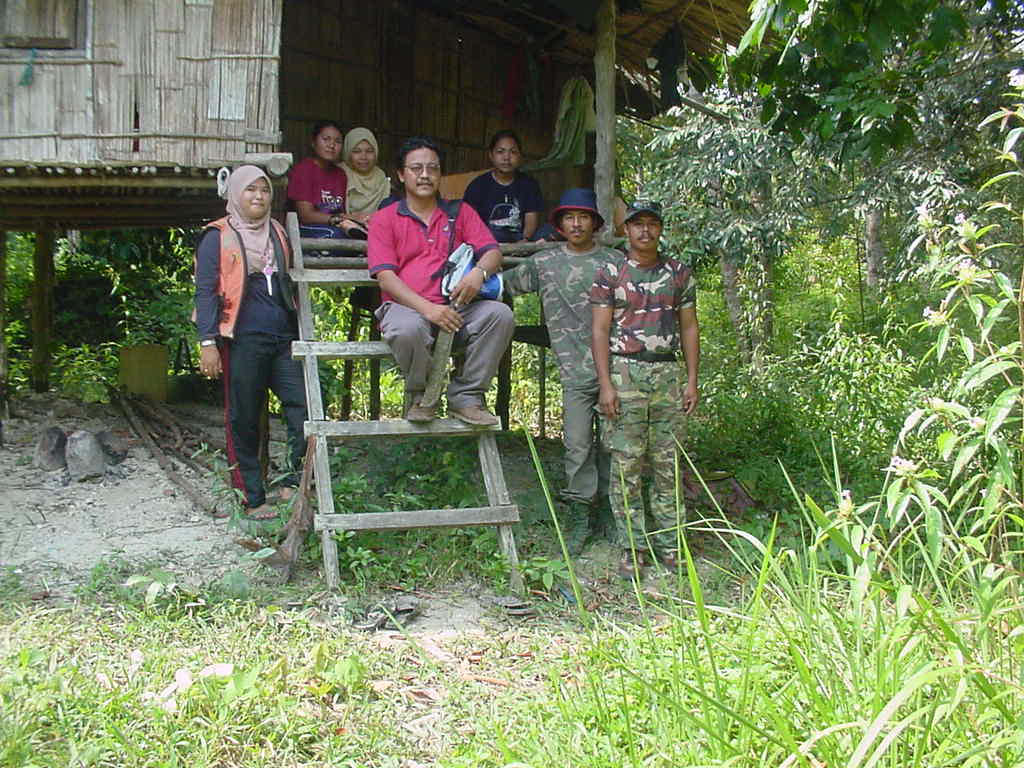
- Semelai people receiving visitors at Tasik Bera, Pahang.

Total population
- 9,228 (2010)

Regions with significant populations
- Malaysia
- Negeri Sembilan & Pahang: https://coac.org.my/basic-data-statistics/

Languages
- Semelai language, Malay language

Religion
- Animism (predominantly), Christianity, Islam

Related ethnic groups
- Temuan people, Semaq Beri people, Mah Meri people, Temoq people

The Semelai people are an indigenous Orang Asli people in Peninsular Malaysia. Their territory spans the lowlands of eastern Negeri Sembilan and southwestern Pahang.

== Settlement areas ==
The Semelai homeland is found in the low-lying terrain in between the Titiwangsa Mountains to the west and Bukit Chermingat to the east, in the south-central part of the Peninsula. The Semelai have lived within the drainage basins of the Muar, Serting, Teriang and Bera rivers and of Bera Lake. The largest natural lake in Malaysia, Bera Lake comprises a large proportion of the Semelai region and the major locus of Semelai population. Because of its treacherous terrain, it was also the last Semelai area to integrate with the outside world. The landscape, prior to drainage for rubber and oil palm plantations in recent years, was largely composed of wetlands and old primary forest. While small clusters of sturdier houses were built near navigable water, more temporary structures were built adjacent to their swidden plots, which were moved further away from the lake and their riverside housing and from each other each year. Semelai sub-groupings were usually named after the main drainage basin they inhabited: smaʔ sərtɛŋ (Serting River People), smaʔ mwɑr (Muar River People), smaʔ tasik (Bera Lake people), smaʔ braʔ (Bera River People), and smaʔ tryaŋ (Teriang River People). There are slight dialectical differences between the Serting/ Muar groups and those on Lake Bera and the Bera River.

Today, many Semelai have moved to urban areas to find work. Those confined to reserves on a small portion of their ancestral territory, nucleated settlements in Jempol, Negeri Sembilan, include those at Sungai Sampo, Sungai Lui, and Panchor. Semelai settlements surround Pos Iskandar and Bera Lake. Kampung Bukit Rok, and Kampung Ibam are situated in the Sungai Bera valley. All are in Bera District, Pahang Settlements at Bukit Gemuroh and Bongkok are within the Teriang District, Pahang.

== Language and culture ==
Semelais speak an Austroasiatic language, which includes linguistic borrowings from Malay, an Austronesian language. Semelai culture has often been classified as Proto-Malay because of some cultural borrowings and physical similarities to Malays. Semelai legend claims that they came to Peninsular Malaysia from Sumatra, but their language places their origins with those of speakers of other Austroasiatic languages (e.g., Mah Meri, Semaq Beri, Semai, Batek) on the Malay Peninsula.

Prior to the mid-20th century, Semelai culture was primarily sustained by pioneering shifting cultivation, although Semelai living along the Serting and Bera Rivers practiced some wet rice agriculture as well. and the trade of minor forest products, especially resins and rattans. The Semelai were autonomous and self-sufficient. However, during the Malayan Emergency (1948–1960), Semelai were resettled around forts established in Semelai and adjacent areas to separate them from Communist insurgent strongholds. Since that time, they have experienced a severe and ongoing loss of their customary lands and waterways through the logging of extensive lowland pristine primary forest, and the establishment of FELDA oil palm schemes, bringing Malay settlers from elsewhere in Malaysia. In general, Orang Asli reserves, established by the government but never gazetted, constitute a small portion of Orang Asli customary lands [tanah adat].

== Population ==
| Year | 1960 | 1965 | 1969 | 1974 | 1980 | 1991 | 1993 | 1996 | 2000 | 2003 | 2004 | 2010 | 2019 |
| Population | 3,238 | 1,391 | 2,391 | 2,874 | 3,096 | 4,775 | 4,103 | 4,103 | 5,026 | 6,418 | 7,198 | 9,228 | 7,727 |

== Social organization ==
Traditionally, Semelais resided in proximity to their relatives, especially siblings and cousins, and their respective spouses. Those who are descended from an ancestor who first lived at a particular location, usually defined by the closest waterway, would be considered the owner of the water (tuhɑn dak) or owner of that place. Marriages that are endogamous often allow both individuals to reside close to their relatives. However, Semelais often marry non-relatives and non-Semelai, especially in more recent years.

Nuclear families are the preferred residential grouping in Semelai villages. However, extended families are also common. It is customary for newly married couples to live with the bride’s family for some period of time until they are able to establish their own separate household. Subsequently, they may chose to live in extended households to assist elderly parents. Hoe found 27 different types of households in the Pos Iskandar area, Man and Thambiah found patterns similar to those Hoe noticed in marriage and post-marital residence patterns, except in regard to the percentage of extended families, which was much higher in Kg. Putat than at Jelawat. The percentage of extended families in Putat had risen because of tight finances and limited land considerations. However, in Putat, the Malaysian government had constructed housing primarily for young elementary families.

Semelai have developed diverse and flexible ways of distributing and sharing land, housing, and other valuable goods. Those relatives kin who resided with and cared for the deceased tend to inherit personal and family property (psakaʔ manah), such as a house, land, jewelry, and dugout canoes. According to Man and Thambiah, a non-Semelai could inherit property from his or her in-laws under these circumstances.

== Political organization ==
Semelai customary law (ʔadat) has been enforced by Semelai political leadersand religious leaders, the shamans (puyɑŋ). Named traditional offices, including baten, məntriʔ, jrukrah, and pŋhuluʔ, have each been passed down through their respective families, but not always. The people in a river valley region needed to accept the person expected to inherit the position of batin. The primary purpose of these positions was to apply customary law, to resolve disputes and to sanctify rites of passage, such as marriages and circumcisions.

== History ==
A historically important trade route between the Strait of Malacca and the South China Sea traversed the Semelai region. The Penarikan, meaning portage in Malay, at Jempol near Bahau, Negeri Sembilan, connected the Peninsular watershed between the headwaters of the Muar and Serting Rivers. Because this portage was at a very low altitude, the rivers had shallow grades so that dugout canoes could travel up to it, making the transport of trade items across the peninsula more efficient. Sixteenth and seventeenth century European maps depict this riverine trade route as a strait, perhaps indicating the magnitude of its importance at that time. A major section of that route runs through Semelai territory. Furthermore, Semelai currency terms date to the Malacca Sultanate, the largest trading emporium along the Maritime Silk Route during the fifteenth century, suggesting that Semelai were actively trading with Melaka at that time.

During the fifteenth century, Minangkabaus began to migrate into Melaka, Negeri Sembilan, western Pahang, and northern Johor from Sumatra. This began a process of moving Orang Asli deeper into the interior of the Peninsula. Subsequently, after occupation of Melaka by the Portuguese and then the Dutch, Orang Asli became far more marginal to the Malayan export economy.

In the early nineteenth century, after Great Britain obtained suzerainty over what became known as Malaya, rates of deforestation and land development increased significantly, as British Colonial officials became advisors to the Sultanates of Pahang and Johor and of Negeri Sembilan. Minangkabau and other Indonesians continued to stream into the Peninsula, establishing farms, especially in Negeri Sembilan. The Semelai and other Orang Asli who made their living from the rain forest were forced to move inland. Chinese also established trading relationships with Orang Asli.

During the Malayan Emergency in the 1950s, as Communist insurgents took refuge in the jungle in close proximity to Semelai habitations, the British colonial government confined Semelais to settlements built around government forts. Changing their pattern of settlement significantly. As a result, today many Semelai settlements cluster around Pos Iskandar at Tasek Bera and Bukit Rok on the Sungai Bera, for example; both of which began as British forts.

Many Semelai today are integrated into the national economy through RISDA smallholder rubber tapping, and oil palm arboriculture. Some have also received university degrees, including graduate degrees. Others have established successful businesses.

== Midwifery ==
It is not unusual in Orang Asli societies to have men, sometimes husbands, assist women in childbirth. The Semelai, for example, have traditionally had home births assisted by both male and female midwives. However, by 1992, there was only one female midwife left. According to Jegetasen, in recent years only the Orang Asli gravitates toward having male traditional midwives, with all the others having moved to only having female midwives.

== Music ==
The Semelai have had a large array of musical instruments that they played individually in the evening and at night. These included bamboo zithers [kranteŋ], rebabs [rbɑk], jew’s harps [giŋgɔŋ], a wooden xylophone [gɑmbɑŋ], and various kinds of bamboo flutes [saloŋ, nabat, lwet, sanoy, and srunay]. The music and songs are biophonic, meaning that they are seen as deriving from the creatures of the natural world. However, with the significant loss of surrounding rainforest, Semelai culture and way of life has changed significantly and these instruments are rarely seen or heard today. However, during parties celebrating weddings and circumcisions, gongs (ttawaʔ), both male (larger) and female (smaller), are played by women, and drums (rbanaʔ) are played by men to accompany singers and dancers. Songs such as lagu riʔon and lagu boroŋ bway are sung using both Semelai and Malay. During all-night shamanic healing rituals, the shaman [puyɑŋ] sang during his celestial journey, accompanied by drumming.
