= Semaq Beri language =

Austroasiatic language spoken in Malaysia

Semaq Beri
- Semoq Beri
- Native to: Malaysia
- Region: Malay Peninsula
- Native speakers: 2,500 (2007)
- Language family: Austroasiatic: Aslian; Southern Aslian; Semaq Beri

Language codes
- ISO 639-3: szc
- Glottolog: sema1265
- ELP: Semaq Beri

Semaq Beri (Semoq Beri) is an Austroasiatic language spoken in the Malay Peninsula in the states of Pahang and Terengganu. It belongs to the Southern division of the Aslian languages, along with Semelai, Temoq, and Mah Meri. A preliminary description of the Semaq Beri language by Nicole Kruspe was published in 2014.

The Semaq Beri are a heterogeneous community, with the northern groups display more characteristics shared with the Northern Aslian speakers such as engaging in mobile foraging, while the southern groups are active in forest product trading and horticulture. Historically, Semaq Beri speakers lacked their own endonym. Semaq Beri is the calque of Malay Orang Hutan 'forest people', and it was bestowed by colonial authorities when the Semaq Beri came under their attention in the 1950s. Prior to this, they were simply labelled by colonial government by the terms Sakai or Jakun.

== Phonology ==
The data for Semaq Beri phonology was collected by Kruspe (2014) from a resettlement community in Terengganu (northern) as part of the author's documentations of the Aslian languages.

=== Word structure ===
The typical phonological template of Semaq Beri ranges from [CV] to [Cə.'CVC]. An epenthetic vowel, usually [ə], occurs between consonant sequences, or [u] if the following phoneme is of labio-velar or palatal segment.

=== Phonemes ===
Semaq Beri consonants
		Labial	Alveolar	Palatal	Velar	Glottal
Plosive	plain	p	t	c	k	ʔ
Plosive	aspirated	pʰ	tʰ	cʰ	kʰ	
Plosive	voiced	b	d	ɟ	ɡ	
Fricative			s			h
Nasal		m	n	ɲ	ŋ	
Approximant		w	l r	j		

- /s/ is the voiceless alveolo-palatal fricative [ɕ]. E.g. /ɲsəc/ 'flesh' [ɲɕə^{i}c].
- /r/ is the least stable consonant. It may be realized as voiced alveolar approximant [ɹ] or a velar lateral approximant [ʟ] in coda position, perhaps due to influence from neighboring Batek. E.g. /srdɔk/ 'to wear' [ɕəɹdɔk / ɕəʟdɔk].
- Voiced and aspirated stops are restricted from occurring in coda position of the final syllable.
- In disyllabic and trisyllabic words, the onset of the penultimate syllable is often a nasal or a liquid, conspicuously result of fossilized infixation, while the onset of the antepenultimate syllable is usually a stop or a fricative.

Semaq Beri vowels
	Front	Central	Back
Close	i ĩ	ɨ ɨ̃	u ũ
Close-mid	e (ẽ)	ə ə̃	o (õ)
Open-mid	ɛ ɛ̃	ə ə̃	ɔ ɔ̃
Open		a ã	ɑ ɑ̃

- /a/ is pronounced as [æ] before /j/.
- Rounded back vowels may be heard as [ʊ, ɤ, ʌ] in rapid speech.
- In onset position, voiced and aspirated stops never co-occur with nasalized vowels.
