= Southern Aslian languages =

Austroasiatic language sub-branch

Southern Aslian
- Semelaic
- Geographic distribution: Malay Peninsula
- Linguistic classification: Austroasiatic: Aslian; Southern Aslian
- Subdivisions: Semelai; Semaq Beri; Mah Meri; Temoq

Language codes
- ISO 639-3: –
- Glottolog: seme1246
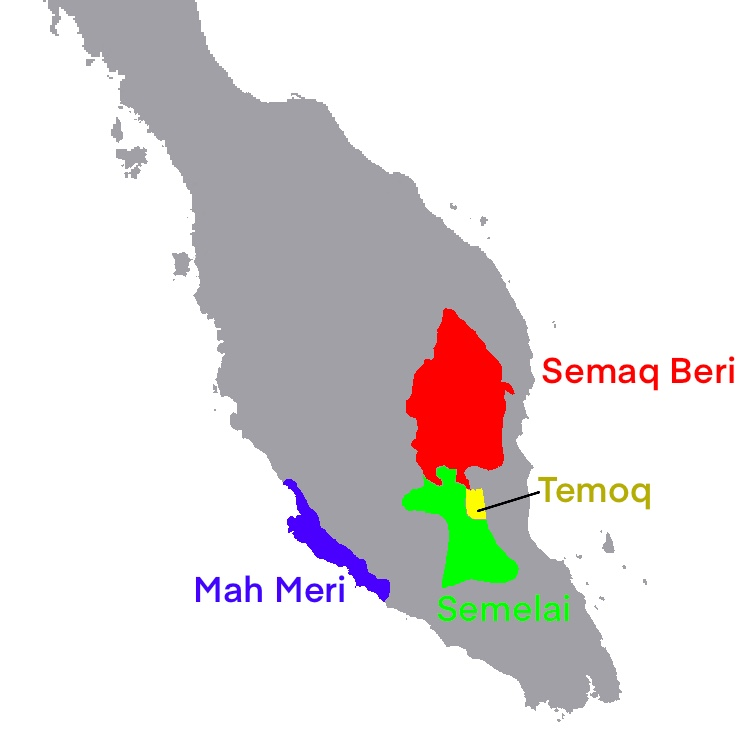

The Southern Aslian languages are a sub-branch of the Aslian branch of the Austroasiatic language family. They have also been referred to as the Semelaic languages, but this label is no longer used. The four languages that make up the branch are:

Semelai, Semaq Beri, Mah Meri (Betise’), and Temoq .

These languages are spoken by no more than 10,000 speakers in total. The languages are considered endangered due to social disruption in the area and the dominance of Malay.
