= Semelai language =

Austroasiatic language spoken in Malaysia

Semelai
- Native to: Malaysia
- Region: Malay Peninsula
- Ethnicity: 6,300 Semelai (2008)
- Native speakers: 4,100 (2009)
- Language family: Austroasiatic: Aslian; Southern Aslian; Semelai
- Writing system: Latin script

Language codes
- ISO 639-3: sza
- Glottolog: seme1247
- ELP: Semelai

Semelai is an Austroasiatic language spoken in the Malay Peninsula by Semelai people. It belongs to the Southern branch of the Aslian language subgrouping. The Semelai people reside predominantly around the Bera, Serting and associated river systems in the states of Pahang, Negeri Sembilan and Johor.

Semelai is a split ergative language motivated by semantics and word order shift.

== Phonology ==
Semelai has 32 consonants and 20 vowels.

Consonants
		Bilabial	Alveolar	Palatal	Velar	Glottal
Plosive	tenuis	p	t	c	k	ʔ
Plosive	aspirated	pʰ	tʰ	cʰ	kʰ	
Plosive	voiced	b	d	ɟ	ɡ	
Fricative			s ~ ɕ			h
Nasal	voiceless	m̥	n̥		ŋ̊	
Nasal	voiced	m	n	ɲ	ŋ	
Nasal	preglottal	ˀm	ˀn	ˀɲ		
Approximant	plain		l	j	w	
Approximant	preglottal		ˀl	ˀj		
Trill	plain		r			
Trill	preglottal		ˀr			

- /p t c k/ are unreleased [p̚ t̚ c̚ k̚] in word-final position.
- /c ɟ/ are slightly affricated [cᶝ ɟᶽ] in word-initial position.
- /s/ may occur as [s] or [ɕ] in free variation.
- /m n ɲ ŋ/ may be prestopped [ᵇm ᵈn ᶡɲ ᶢŋ] in word-final position.
- /r/ can be heard as a tap [ɾ] in word-final position. When preceded by /n/ it is heard as [ᵈr].
- /w j/ are heard as off-glides [ʷ ʲ] in word-final position.
- /w j/ are nasalized [w̃ j̃] after nasal vowels.

Vowels
	Front		Central		Back	
	oral	nasal	oral	nasal	oral	nasal
Close	i	ĩ	ʉ	ʉ̃	u	ũ
Close-mid	e	ẽ	ə	ə̃	o	õ
Open-mid	ɛ	ɛ̃	ə	ə̃	ɔ	ɔ̃
Open			a	ã	ɒ	ɒ̃

- /ɒ/ is phonetically noted as [ɒ̙].
- /i/ can be heard as [ɪ] in closed syllables.
- /ə/ can be heard as [ʌ] in stressed word-final syllables.

== Morphosyntax ==
Semelai has many inchoative verbs such as rmɔl "to be male", hitam "be black", which at the first glance may hint a flexible language like nearby Austronesian languages. However, the vast majority of Semelai lemmas can be identified unproblematically to a particular word category. Verbs and nouns must undergo derivation via infixation or prefixation in order to function as other lexical categories, eg. rlmɔl "male" → rmɔl "to be male", yɔk "take" → nk-yɔk "taking INF". Loan words from Austronesian are mostly precategorial, eg. tuŋkɒt "a stick, to prop up". The language recognizes several distinct parts of speech that are morphologically and syntactically distinguished: the superclass nominal (which includes nouns as an open word class); verb; expressive; preposition; adverb; auxiliary; existential and ascriptive predicators; negator; connective; interjection.

=== Nominal morphology ===
==== Free pronouns ====
Semelai free pronouns
	Minimal familiar	Minimal	Augmented	Singular	Plural
1st person	ʔəɲ	yɛ	yɛʔen		
2nd person	kɒ	ji	jɛʔen		
1st & 2nd		hɛ	hɛʔen		
3rd person				kəh	deh
3rd Subject				kəhn	dehn

==== Pronominal clitics ====
These pronominal clitics are used to mark agreement with the ergative argument of transitive verbs and highly volitional argument of intransitive, human activity-denoting verbs.

	Minimal familiar	Minimal	Augmented	Singular	Plural
1st person	ʔəɲ=	yɛ=	hɛ=		
2nd person	kɒ=	ji=	hɛ=		
3rd person				ki=	de=
3rd Unidentified				ko=	
