= Sakai people (Indonesia) =

Ughang Pebatin, Orang Senoi
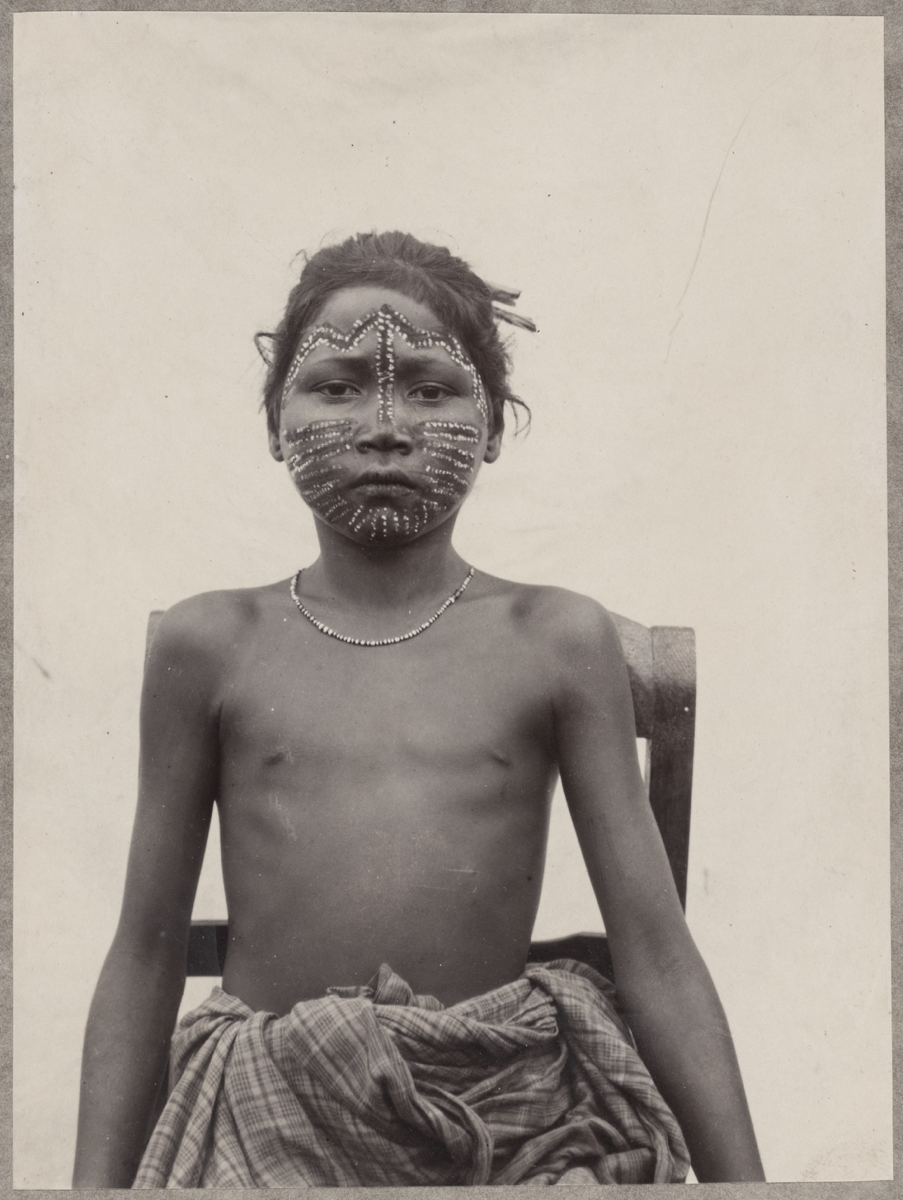
- Sakai girl from Perak

Total population
- (Malaysia): 60,000-100,000; (Indonesia): 5,000

Regions with significant populations
- Malaysia Region: Perak; Selangor; Pahang; Kelantan; Negeri Sembilan; Indonesia region; East Sumatera; West Sumatera; Riau Islands

Languages
- Senoic languages (Semai, Temiar), Southern Aslian languages (Semaq Beri, Mah Meri, Semelai, Temoq), Che Wong, Jah Hut, Malay, English, Indonesian

Religion
- Animism, Islam, Christian

Related ethnic groups
- Orang Asli (Semang (Lanoh people, Jahai people, Batek people), Proto-Malay, Malay People, Senoi, Minangkabau people, (Semelai people, Temoq people))

Sakai or Senoi is a tribal community in Malaysia and Indonesia, traditionally living in the interior of Peninsular Malaysia, Sumatra. Some of them still lead a nomadic and hunter-gatherer lifestyle in the remote interior of Peninsular Malaysia and Sumatra, while most settled into major cities and towns in Sumatra with the rise of industrialization.

== History ==
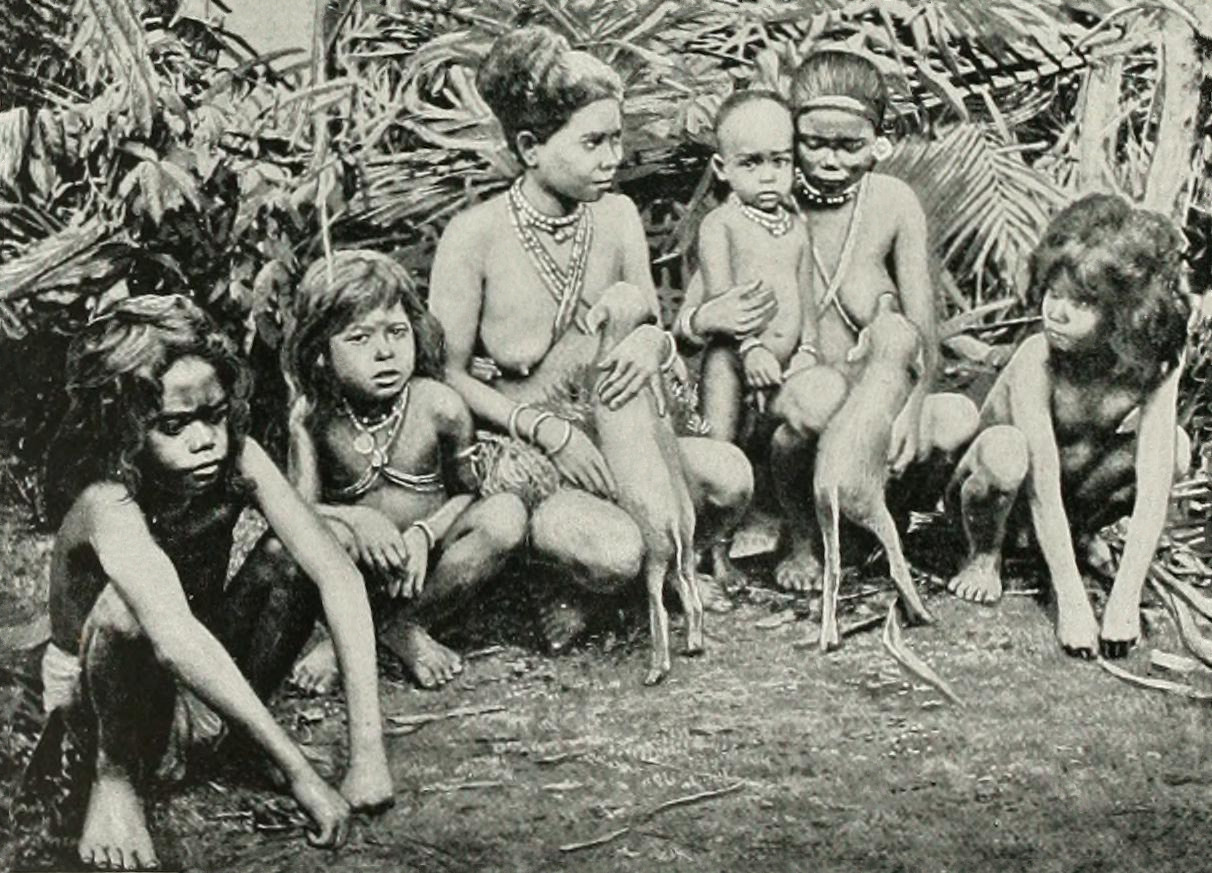
A Senoi (Sakai) family, 1908.

The Senoi or Sakai are believed to have arrived on the Malaya Peninsula about 8000 to 6000 B.C during the Middle of the Holocene period, the population of the Malay Peninsula has undergone significant changes in its biological physiognomy, material culture, production skills and language. They were partly caused by the arrival of migrant farmers from the more northern parts of mainland Southeast Asia (Thailand, Cambodia, Vietnam). The arrival of migrants is associated with the emergence of fire-cutting agriculture on the Malay Peninsula and the emergence of rice. As a result of mixing new groups with local Negrito tribes, the ancestors of the Senoi, who lived in the northern and central parts of the peninsula. The introduction of agriculture has led to the semi-permanent residence of related groups, as well as the formation of more stable social structures in their environment. The refusal of constant movement prompted the formation of individual local communities and peoples.

The population of the peninsula is divided into two groups, each with its own stable socio-economic complex, namely Semang and Senoi people. The Semang people lived in dense rain forests located at altitudes below 300 meters above sea level, and were engaged in nomadic hunting and gathering. Senoi lived at higher altitudes and cultivated their agricultural land. Contacts between the two groups were minimal, the Senoi people only exchanged their agricultural produce for jungle gifts.

Migrants from the north brought not only agriculture but also Aslian languages, which are now spoken by both the Senoi and the Semang people.

Early Austronesian migrants arrived on the Malay Peninsula about 2,500 years ago. They were the ancestors of modern Proto-Malays (Jakun people, Temuan people) as well as Melayu Jatis (Kelantanese, Kedahans, Terengganuans, Pahangese etc.). The other Malays arrived later, probably about 1,500 to 2,000 years ago. The Orang Asli tribes were not isolated. Around 500 BC, small coastal settlements appeared on the Malay Peninsula, which became centers of trade and maintained contacts with China, India, Thailand, the Middle East, and the Mediterranean. Orang Asli became suppliers of jungle produce (aromatic wood, rubber, rhino horns and elephant tusks), as well as gold and tin ore, with the latter was especially sought out by Indian traders for the production of bronze. In exchange, the indigenous people of the Malay Peninsula received goods such as fabrics, iron tools, necklaces and food, including rice. Under the influence of external contacts there is another cultural tradition of the indigenous population, characteristic of modern Proto-Malays. There are reports that South Asian languages may be related to modern Mah Meri language or Semelai language, in the past were common in the interiors of Negeri Sembilan, Pahang and Johor. Later they became part of the Jakun people and Temuan people. Thus, the southern groups of Senoi were directly involved in shaping the tradition of the indigenous Proto-Malays.

At the end of the 14th century. on the coast of the Malay Peninsula, the Malays established their trading settlements, the most famous of which was Melaka. At the beginning of the 15th century, the ruler of Malacca converted to Islam. The number of Malays was constantly increasing due to the influx of new migrants from Sumatra and other parts of modern-day Indonesia, as well as the assimilation of the Orang Asli. Malay migrants moved in slowly by rivers into the interior of the peninsula, and most Orang Asli retreated in parallel to the foothills and mountains. The Malay language and culture gradually spread. As the Malay population increased, the political and economic importance of the Orang Asli were diminished. Their numbers also declined, and now the indigenous population that remains are only the minorities that rejected assimilation.

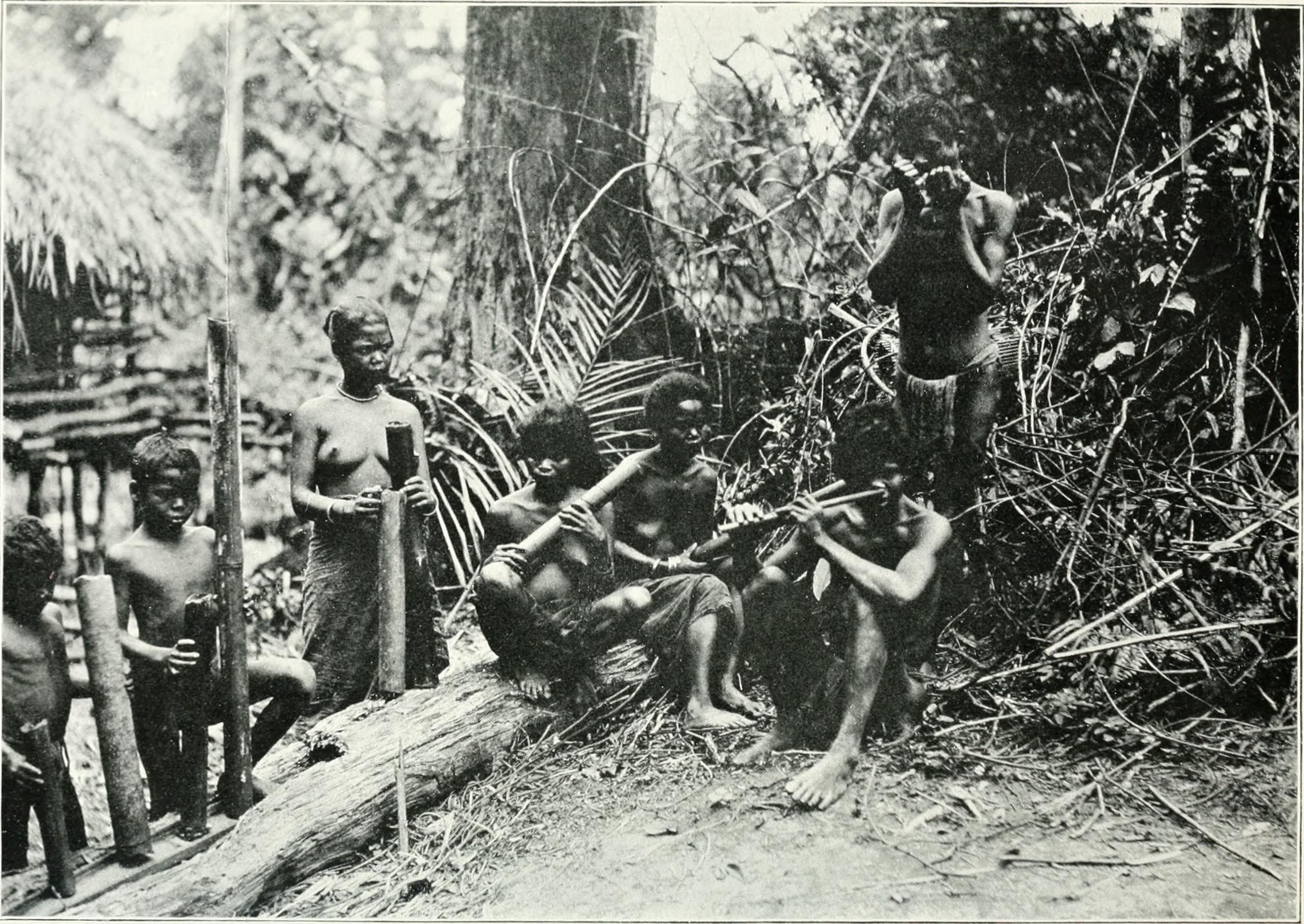
A group of Senoi tribe with musical instruments at Chenderiang, Batang Padang District, Perak, 1906.

The rise of the Malay states first turned the Senoi people into subordinates and after the establishment of Islam, they were regarded as despised pagans and kafirs. The lifestyle of the Orang Asli, their clothing traditions, as well as their physical characteristics among the Malays became the object of ridicule. In the 18th and 19th centuries, Orang Asli fell victim to slave raiders, mostly Malays from Sumatra. The indigenous people were not Muslims, so they were not banned from being enslaved by other Muslims. Typically, well-armed men attacked a village or camp at night, killing adult men and women and capturing children. Sometimes Malays provoked or forced Orang Asli leaders to abduct people from another group of Orang Asli, whom they handed over to the Malays; in an attempt to protect their own wives from captivity. Enthusiastic slaves formed the labor force both in the cities and in the households of the chiefs and sultans; while others were sold in slave markets to slave traders, who transported them to other lands, including Java. From that time comes the derogatory term "sakai" as used by the Malays for the Senoi people; which means "animal (rough or savages) aborigines" or "slaves". Following the British Slavery Abolition Act 1833, slavery was subsequently abolished throughout the British Empire and slave raiding was made illegal by the British colonial government in British Malaya in 1883, although there were records of slave raiding up to the 20th centuries in the 1920s.

The events of the past have sown a deep distrust of the Orang Asli people towards the Malay population. They tried to isolate themselves in remote areas. Only the abolition of slavery has led to the increase of contact with outsiders. The Malayan Emergency of the 1950s in British Malaya accelerated the penetration of the state into the interiors. In an attempt to deprive the Malayan Communist Party of support from the Orang Asli, the British carried out forced relocation of the indigenous people to special camps under the protection of the army and police. They were living in the camps for two years, after which they were allowed to return to the jungle. This event was a severe blow to them, as hundreds of people died in the camps from various diseases. Since then, the government has paid more attention to the Senoi and other indigenous peoples. Then the Department of Aboriginal Affairs, the predecessor of the modern JAKOA was founded in 1954, which was authorized to lead the Orang Asli communities. In 1956, during the struggle against the Malayan Communist Party insurgents, the British colonial authorities created Senoi Praaq detachments (in Semai language, it roughly means "military people"), which served as military intelligence in addition to police functions. They consisted of Orang Asli and operated in the deep jungle. Senoi Praaq units proved to be very effective and their operations were extremely successful in suppressing the communist insurgents. They gained notoriety for their brutality, which surpassed any other unit of the security forces. Today, they are now part of the General Operations Force of the Royal Malaysia Police.

Since the 1980s, there has been an active invasion of Orang Asli areas by individuals, as well as corporations and state governments. Logging and the replacement of jungles for rubber and oil palm plantations have become widespread. These processes gained the greatest scale in the 1990s. These processes severely disrupted the lives of most of the Orang Asli tribes. Without the jungles, former hunter-gatherers no longer have the opportunity to gather wild fruits and hunt wild animals. They have to adapt to a new way of life associated with the monetary economy. The construction of highways and the development of the plantation economy cause the relocation of the indigenous population to cities and new villages, specially built for them by state governments.

there could be no doubt that the Malays were the indigenous people of this country because the original inhabitants did not have any form of civilisation compared with the Malays ..... [These] inhabitants also had no direction and lived like primitives in mountains and jungles

— Tunku Abdul Rahman, Malaysia's first Prime Minister, The Star (Malaysia), 6 November 1986

The government's policy is to convert the indigenous people to Islam and to integrate them into the main population of the country as settled peasants. At the same time, the Orang Asli would prefer to modernise without becoming Malays, even when converting to Islam. After joining the mainstream society, Orang Asli occupy the lowest rungs of the social ladder. Even their status as the first indigenous people of the peninsula is now being challenged on the almost incomprehensible grounds that they were not carriers of "civilisation." The political state in Malaysia is largely organised around the idea of preserving the special ethnic status (Malay supremacy) of the Malays as the natives (bumiputera in Malay language, literally means "son of the soil") of the land to equal among the indigenous communities. Although the more dominant Malays, the Orang Asal of East Malaysia and the Orang Asli are considered as bumiputera, they do not enjoy the same equal ranking nor the same rights and privileges. In practice, this has profound implications for the rights of the Orang Asli to the land they have held for a millennium, and which are now largely threatened with transfer to other hands. Prolonged litigation related to these issues is conducted in several states of Peninsular Malaysia, and often ends in favour of the Orang Asli especially those that received public attention.

== Status and Identity ==
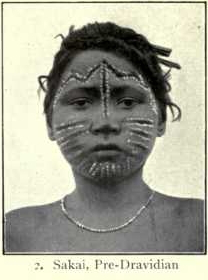
A Senoi (Sakai) woman, 1899.

The Malaysian government classifies the indigenous people of Peninsular Malaysia as Orang Asli (meaning "indigenous peoples" in Malay). There are 18 officially recognized tribes under the auspices of the Department of Aboriginal Affairs (Jabatan Kemajuan Orang Asli, JAKOA). They are divided into 3 ethnic groups namely, Semang (Negrito), Senoi and Proto-Malays, which consist of 6 tribes each. Such a division is conditional and is based primarily on the convenience of the state to perform administrative functions. The terms "Semang", "Senoi" and "Proto Malays" do not refer to specific ethnic groups or their ethnic identity. For the Orang Asli, they are of external origin. Each of the tribes is completely independent and does not associate itself with any wider ethnic category of the population.

The three ethnic group division of the Orang Asli was developed by British colonizers in the early twentieth century according to early European racial concepts. Due to the fact that the three ethnic groups differ in language, appearance (physical characteristics) and the nature of their traditional economy, Negritos (short, dark, curly) were considered the most primitive race, Senois (taller, with lighter skin, wavy black hair) as more advanced, and Aboriginal Malays (tall, fair-skinned, with straight hair) were perceived almost on an equal footing with Muslim Malays. Later, concepts that are deemed racist were rejected and the categories of Semang, Senoi and Proto-Malay (a Malay term that replaced "Aboriginal Malays") became markers of different models of cultural traditions and specific socio-economic complexes. The Senoi model, in particular, provides for the existence of autonomous communities, whose main means of subsistence are based on slash-and-burn agriculture, which on a small scale is supplemented with hunting, fishing, gathering, and the processing and sale of jungle produce. In this respect, they differ from the Semangs (hunter-gatherers) and the Proto-Malays (settled farmers).

The Senoi people are also known as Sakai people among the locals. For the Malay people, the term sakai is a derogatory term in Malay language and its derivative word menyakaikan means "to treat with arrogance and contempt". However, for the Senoi people mensakai means "to work together". During the colonial British administration, Orang Asli living in the northern Malay Peninsula were classified as Senoi and to a point later it was also a term to refer to all Orang Asli. On the other hand, the Central Senois; particularly of Batang Padang District, prefer to call themselves Mai Darat as opposed to the term sakai. It is often misunderstood that Senoi people who have abandoned their own language for the Malay language are called the Blandas, Biduanda or Mantra people. The Blandas people are of the Senoi race from Melaka. The Blandas language or Bahasa Blandas, which is a mixture of Malay language and Senoic language; is probably used predating the first arrivals of the Malay people in Melaka.

== Demography ==
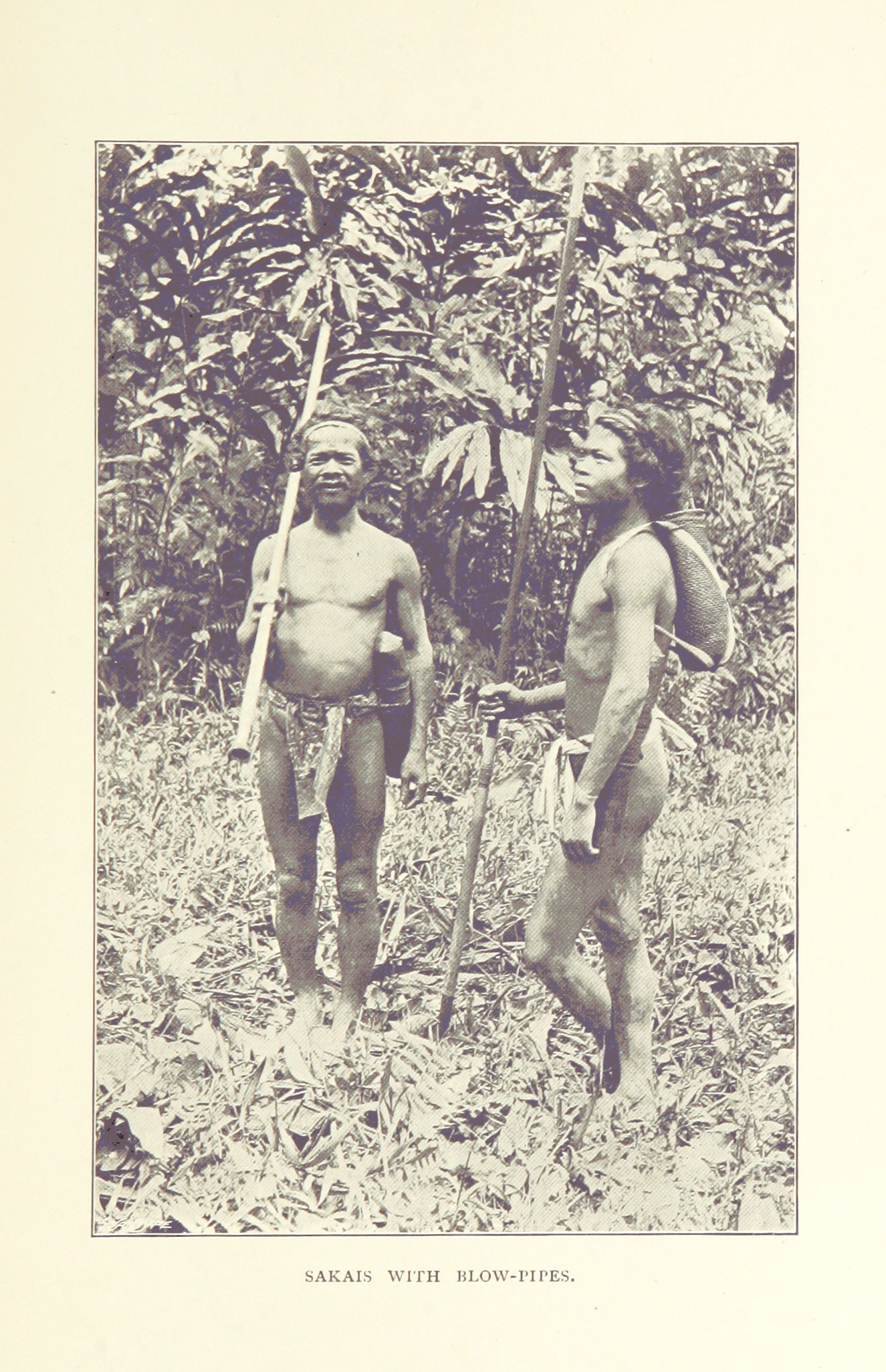
Senoi (Sakai) men with blowguns, 1898.

The Senoi or Sakai tribes live in the central region of the Malay Peninsula and consist of six different groups, namely the Semai, Temiar, Mah Meri, Jah Hut, Semaq Beri and the Cheq Wong and have a total population of about 60,000. An example of a typical Senoi (Central Sakai) people, the purest of the Sakai are found in Jeram Kawan, Batang Padang District, Perak.

The available data on the population of individual Senoic tribes are as follows:-

Year	1960	1965	1969	1974	1980	1982	1991	1993	1996	2000	2003	2004	2005	2010
Semai people	11,609	12,748	15,506	16,497	17,789	N/A	28,627	26,049	26,049	34,248	43,892	43,927	N/A	49,697
Temiar people	8,945	9,325	9,929	10,586	12,365	N/A	16,892	15,122	15,122	17,706	25,725	25,590	N/A	30,118
Jah Hut people	1,703	1,893	2,103	2,280	2,442	N/A	N/A	3,193	3,193	2,594	5,104	5,194	N/A	4,191
Cheq Wong people	182	268	272	215	203	250	N/A	N/A	403	234	664	564	N/A	818
Mah Meri people	1,898	1,212	1,198	1,356	1,389	N/A	N/A	2,185	2,185	3,503	2,986	2,856	2,200	2,120
Semaq Beri people	1,230	1,418	1,406	1,699	1,746	N/A	N/A	2,488	2,488	2,348	3,545	3,345	N/A	3,413
Semelai people	3,238	1,391	2,391	2,874	3,096	N/A	4,775	4,103	4,103	5,026	6,418	7,198	N/A	9,228
Temoq people	51	52	100	N/A	N/A	N/A	N/A	N/A	N/A	N/A	N/A	N/A	N/A	N/A
Total	28,856	28,307	32,905	35,507	39,030	250	50,294	53,140	53,543	65,659	88,334	88,674	2,200	99,585

These data come from different sources, therefore, are not always consistent. JAKOA figures, for example, do not take into account of Orang Asli living in cities that do not fall under JAKOA's jurisdiction. Differences in the calculation of Semai people and Temiar people sometimes make up about 10-11%. A significant number of Orang Asli now live in urban areas and their numbers can only be estimated, as they are not recorded separately from the Malays. However, this does not mean that they were assimilated into the Malay community.

Distribution of Senoi peoples by state (JHEOA, 1996 census):-

	Perak	Kelantan	Terengganu	Pahang	Selangor	Negeri Sembilan	Melaka	Johor	Total
Semai people	16,299	91		9,040	619				26,049
Temiar people	8,779	5,994		116	227	6			15,122
Jah Hut people				3,150	38	5			3,193
Cheq Wong people	4			381	12			6	403
Mah Meri people					2,162	12	7	4	2,185
Semaq Beri people			451	2,037					2,488
Semelai people				2,491	135	1,460	6	11	4,103
Total	25,082	6,085	451	17,215	3,193	1,483	13	21	53,543

== Tribal groups ==
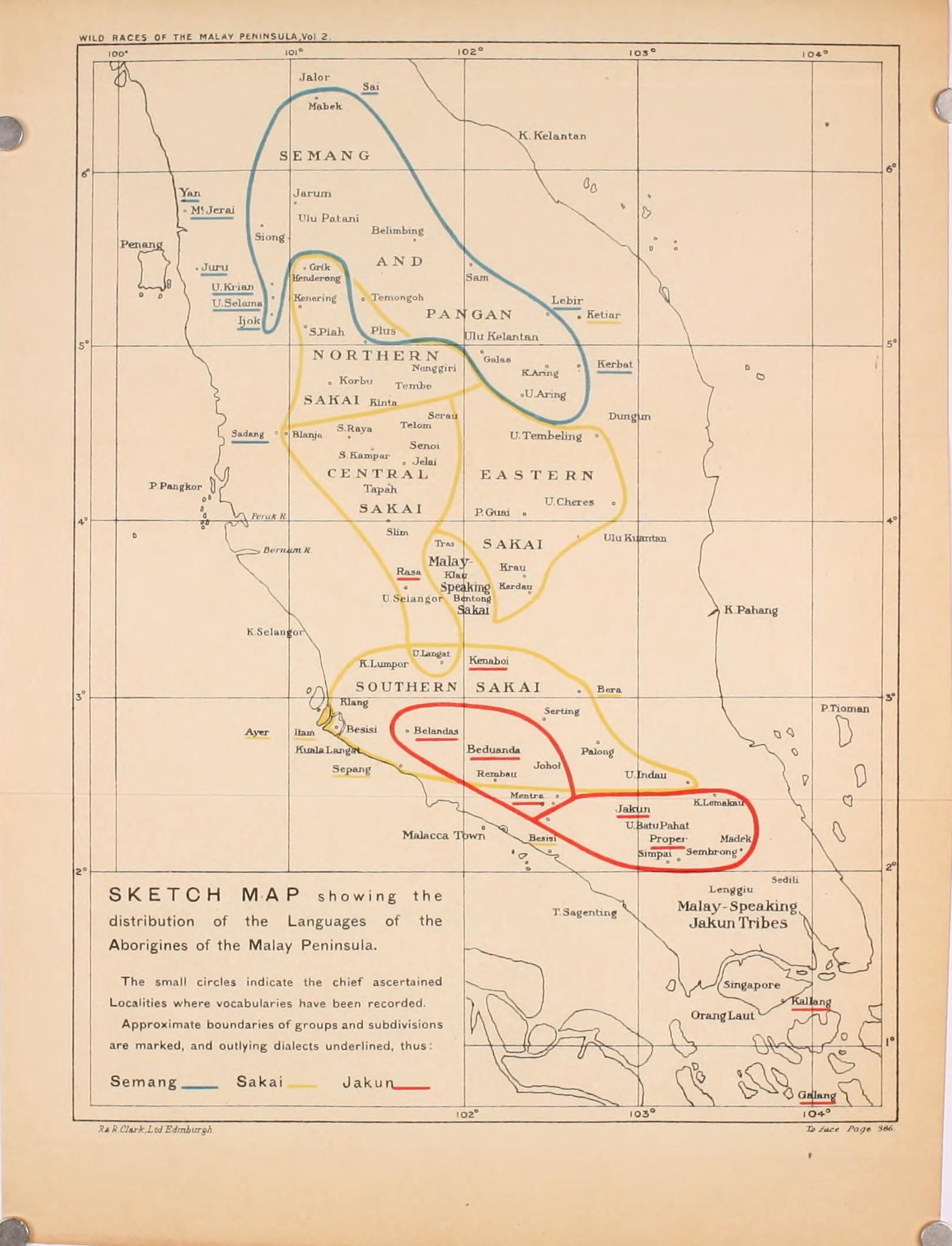
Orang Asli settlement map (1906); areas of settlement of the Senoi (Sakai) people are marked by a yellow line.

Senoi is the largest group of Orang Asli, their share is about 54 percent of the total number of Orang Asli. The Senoi ethnic group includes 6 tribes namely, the Cheq Wong people, the Mah Meri people, the Jah Hut people, the Semaq Beri people, the Semai people and the Temiar people. They are closely related to the Semelai people, one of the tribes classified as part of the Proto-Malays. There is another smaller tribal group, the Temoq people, which ceased to exist in the 1980s when the predecessor of JAKOA included them in the ethnic group.

The criteria used to identify people as Senoi are inconsistent. This group usually includes tribes that speak Central Aslian languages and engage in slash-and-burn agriculture. These criteria are met by the Semai people and Temiar people; the two largest Senoi peoples. But the Senoi also include the Cheq Wong people, whose language is of the North Aslian languages group, the Jah Hut people, whose language occupies a special place among the Aslian languages on its own, and the Semaq Beri people are speakers of the Southern Aslian languages. Culturally, the Senoi also include the Semelai people and Temoq people, who are officially included in the Proto-Malays. At the same time, the Mah Meri people, who according to the official classification are considered to be Senoi, are engaged in agriculture and fishing and are culturally closer to the Malays. The last three peoples speak Southern Aslian languages.

- Cheq Wong people (Chewong, Ceq Wong, Che 'Wong, Ceʔ Wɔŋ, Siwang) are semi-Negritos living in three or four villages on the southern slopes of Mount Benom in remote areas of western Pahang (Raub District and Temerloh District). The ethnological classification of the Cheq Wong people has always been problematic. The name "chewong" is a distortion of the name of a Malay employee in the Department of Hunting, Siwang bin Ahmat before the Second World War period, which the British huntsman misunderstood as the name of an ethnic group. The traditional Che Wong economy was dominated by jungle produce gathering. Their language belongs to the Northern Aslian languages group, it is related to the Semang's languages.
- Temiar people (Northern Sakai, Temer, Təmεr, Ple) are the second largest Senoi people. They are inhabited by 5,200 km of jungle on both sides of the Titiwangsa Mountains, inhabiting southern Kelantan and northeastern Perak. As a rule, they live in the upper reaches of rivers, in the highest and most isolated regions. In the peripheral areas of their ethnic territory they maintain intensive contacts with neighboring peoples. The main traditional occupations are slash-and-burn agriculture and trading.
- Semai people (Central Sakai, Səmay, Səmey) is the largest tribe not only of the Senoi ethnic group, but also of all Orang Asli. They live south of the Temiar people, in separate groups, also on both slopes of the Titiwangsa Mountains in southern Perak, northwestern Pahang, and neighboring areas of Selangor. The main traditional occupations are slash-and-burn agriculture and trading, they are also engaged in the cultivation of commercial crops and labour work. They live in different conditions, from mountainous jungles to urban areas. The Semai people have never had a strong sense of shared identity. Mountain dwelling Semai people refers to their fellow lowland relatives as "Malays"; and they in turn, refers to their fellow mountain dwelling relatives as "Temiars".
- Jah Hut people (Jah Hět, Jah Hət) are located in the Temerloh District and Jerantut District, on the eastern slopes of Mount Benom in central Pahang, the eastern neighbours of the Cheq Wong people. Their traditional occupation includes slash-and-burn agriculture.
- Semaq Beri people (Səmaʔ Bərēh, Semoq Beri) are inhabitants of the interior of Pahang (Jerantut District, Maran District, Kuantan District) and Terengganu (Hulu Terengganu District, Kemaman District). The name Semaq Beri was first given to one of the local groups by the British colonial administrators, and later the name spread to the whole nation. In their language, it means "jungle people". Traditional occupations of the people were slash-and-burn agriculture, hunting and gathering. Divided into settlement groups in the south and groups of former hunter-gatherers who in the past roamed over a large area around Bera Lake in Pahang, as well as in Terengganu and Kelantan. Many other Orang Asli see the Semaq Beri people as Semelai people.
- Semelai people (Səməlay) are located in central Pahang, in particular in the area of Bera Lake, the rivers of Bera District, Teriang, Paya Besar and Paya Badak. They also live on the Pahang border with the Negeri Sembilan (along the rivers of Serting and Sungai Lui, and in the lowlands north of Segamat District to the southern riverbanks of the Pahang River) and on the other side of the border between these states. Officially included in the Proto-Malay population. Jungle gathering was not part of their traditional economic complex. In addition to slash-and-burn agriculture, they fish in lakes and work for hire.
- Temoq people (Təmɔʔ) is a little-known group which currently is not officially recognised by JAKOA, although in the past it was included in its list of ethnic tribes. They are included together with the Semelai people's population, their western neighbours. They live in Pahang, along the Jeram River in northeastern of Bera Lake. Traditionally they are nomads and from time to time engaged in agriculture.
- Mah Meri people (Hmaʔ MərĪh, other obsolete names are Besisi, Besisi, Btsisi', Ma' Betise', Hma' Btsisi') live in the coastal areas of Selangor. In addition to agriculture, engaged in fishing. Among all of the Senoi peoples, the Mah Meri people were most affected by the Malay people. However, they are afraid to live in urban areas, and their commitment to their own customary lands remains very strong.

In the past, there must have been other Senoi tribes. In the upper reaches of the Klau River west of Mount Benum, the mysterious Beri Nyeg or Jo-Ben are mentioned, speaking a language quite closely related to Cheq Wong people. The Jah Chong tribe, which could speak a dialect very different from the Jah Hut people was also reported. Several dialects associated with Besis (Mah Meri people) existed in the Kuala Lumpur area. Perhaps there were other tribes speaking Southern Aslian languages and live in areas that currently inhabited by the Temuan people and Jakun people, speakers of Austronesian languages.

Government development programmes are aimed at the rapid clearing of jungles on mountain slopes. As a result, modern areas of Senoi are becoming increasingly limited.

== life ==
Most of the Sakai community living today are involved in agriculture. There are no definite data about the number of Sakai. Population data issued by the Ministry of Social Affairs Republic of Indonesia stated that the number of Sakai in Bengkalis Regency of 4,995 inhabitants.
