= Semai =

Semai may refer to:

- Semai people
- Semai language
