= Lanoh language =

Austroasiatic language spoken in Malaysia

Lanoh
- lanɔh
- Native to: Malaysia
- Region: Perak
- Ethnicity: 240 (2008)
- Language family: Austroasiatic: Aslian; Central Aslian; Lanoh
- Dialects: Jengjeng; Yir
- Writing system: Unwritten

Language codes
- ISO 639-3: lnh
- Glottolog: lano1248
- ELP: Lanoh

Lanoh, also known by the alternative name Jengjeng, is an endangered aboriginal Aslian language spoken in Perak, a state of western Malaysia.

It belongs to the Central Aslian branches of the Aslian languages, which also includes Sabüm (its closest language but now extinct), Semnam, Temiar and Semai, all spoken in the same state.

== See also ==
- Lanoh people
