= Semnam language =

Austroasiatic language spoken in Malaysia

Semnam
- [səmˈnãːm] /smnaːm/
- Native to: Malaysia
- Region: Perak
- Native speakers: (670 cited 2000)
- Language family: Austroasiatic: Aslian; Central Aslian; Semnam

Language codes
- ISO 639-3: ssm
- Glottolog: semn1250

Semnam is an Austroasiatic language spoken by the Semnam, a subtribe of the Lanoh people, in Peninsular Malaysia. It forms part of the Senoic branch, alongside the Sabüm, Semai, Temiar and Lanoh languages.
