= Temiar =

Temiar may refer to:

- Temiar people
- Temiar language
