= Sabüm language =

Austroasiatic language spoken in Malaysia

Sabüm
- sabɨːm
- Pronunciation: [sabɨːm]
- Native to: Malaysia
- Region: Perak
- Extinct: after 1976
- Language family: Austroasiatic: Aslian; Central Aslian; Sabüm

Language codes
- ISO 639-3: sbo
- Glottolog: sabu1253
- ELP: Sabüm

Sabüm is an aboriginal Aslian language of Lenggong, Malaya, extinct as of 2013. It was nearly extinct by 1976. Sabum became a distinct dialect from Lanoh around 610 AD. It split from Semnam between 730 to 985 AD; it then came into close contact with the Yir dialect of Lanoh. The Sabum have since switched to Temiar.

== Vocabulary ==
English	Sabüm	Semnam
To turn	ciwɛl	hirat
To suck	jəhʉd	soːʔ
Dirty	kamah	kamaːh
Wing	pajeɟ	pjec
Root	jɛːs	jʔɛːs
