= Semai people =

Ethnic group of the Malay Peninsula

Semai Mai Semai / Mai Kateh
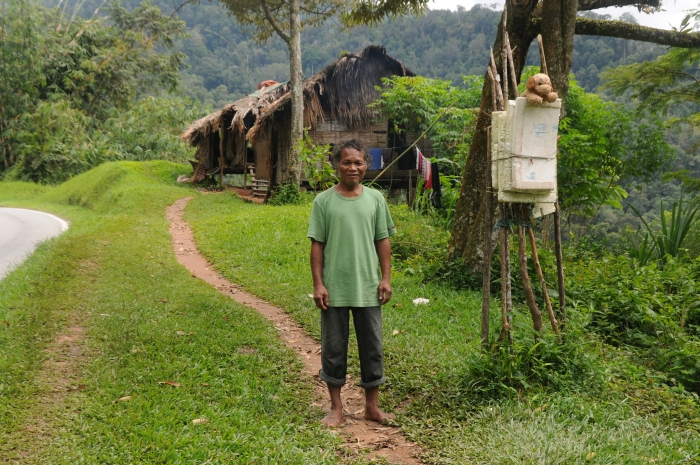
- A Semai man in Tapah, Perak, Malaysia.

Total population
- 50,000

Regions with significant populations
- Malaysia (Perak and Pahang)

Languages
- Semai language, Malay language

Religion
- Animism, Christianity and Islam.

Related ethnic groups
- Temiar people, Lanoh people, Khmer people

The Semai (also known as Mai Semai or Sengoi Hik) are a semi-sedentary ethnic group living in the center of the Malay Peninsula in Southeast Asia, known especially for their nonviolence. This characterization was made by Robert Knox Dentan, an anthropologist who studied the Semai in the 1960s, though he offered a more nuanced view after subsequent fieldwork. They speak Semai, an Austroasiatic language closely related to Temiar, spoken by Temiars nearby. The Semai are bordered by the Temiars to the north and the Jah Hut to the South. The Semai belong to the Senoi group, and are one of the largest indigenous ethnic group in the Peninsula and the largest of the Senoi group. Most Semai subsist by cultivating grain crops, hunting, and fishing.

== Origins ==
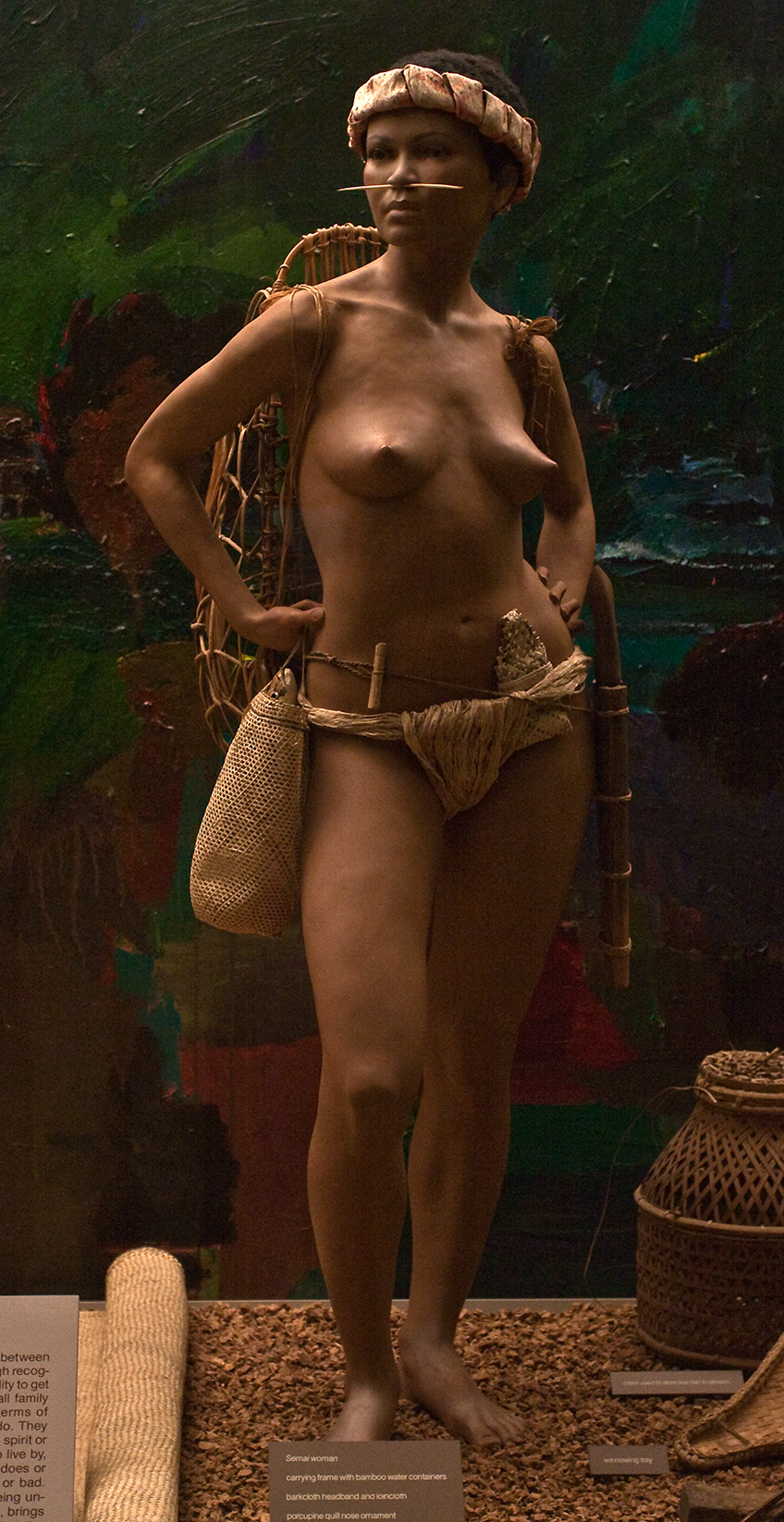
Painted epoxy sculpture of a Semai woman at the American Museum of Natural History

It is thought that the Semai are the descendants of the original population of Southeast Asia, arriving on the Malay peninsula approximately sometime during 8000 to 6000 BC. According to Keene State College's Orang Asli Archive, in 1991 there were 26,627 Semai and according to the Center for Orang Asli Concerns in 2000 there were 34,248 Semai living on the Malay Peninsula. This number has increased in recent years with the advent of better nutrition as well as improved sanitation and healthcare practices. These numbers, however, do not include other peoples of Semai or mixed descent, most of whom have assimilated into other cultures and have abandoned their ancestral tribal lands in order to seek better employment and education opportunities, especially in the larger cities.

A genetic study conducted in 1995 by a team of biologists from the National University of Singapore has shown a close relationship between the Semai and the Khmer of Cambodia. This is in line with the linguistic situation of the Semai, whose language belongs to the Mon-Khmer family. Furthermore, the Semai seem to be more closely related to the Javanese than to their Malay neighbors on the peninsula. The Malays are thought to have arrived on the peninsula approximately 1000 years after the Semai, at first trading peacefully with them. However, when the Malays created kingdoms and converted to Islam, this relationship changed. The Malays began considering the Semai as "despised pagans" and sanctioned murdering Semai adults and kidnapping young children. Several Malaysian state governments have religious agencies that have programs to convert the Semai to Islam.

== Subsistence ==
The Semai are semi-sedentary horticulturalists who practice "slash and burn" agriculture. They mainly rely on growing rice and manioc or cassava roots for their subsistence. The Semai use machetes to clear forested areas, after which they burn and plant crops in that area. After two or three harvests when the land is worn, the Semai will begin planting in a new area. The Semai also supplement their diet with hunting and fishing, as well as raising chickens (for their own consumption) and goats and ducks (to sell to the Malays). Fish are mainly caught by women, who use basket traps to scoop fish, whereas hunting is primarily done by men, using blowguns, poison darts, and spears. Any large game caught, such as deer, pigs, pythons, or binturong (bearcat), are shared among the community.

== Culture ==
=== Settlement ===
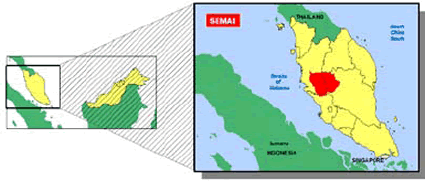
Semai Live in the center of the Malay Peninsula.

The Semai live in settlements of 30 to 200 people. Individual households consist of nuclear families with sometimes a few extended relatives. Most dwellings are built with wood, bamboo with weaved walls and thatched roofs using palm leaves. Semai houses have no visible bedrooms, especially for the children, as they all sleep in the main hall. The only separation seems to be in the form of wooden-beaded curtains for the parents' chambers. This form of separation is also adopted by the coastal Malays, who use instead curtains made of seashells, and deutero-Malays, who use the batik cloth to form the curtains. There are no locks or otherwise, usual devices used to preventing an unwanted entry into any of these rooms. A simple way of telling that an entry is unwanted is by drawing down the curtains. To allow entry, the curtain is drawn to the sides and tied to form an opening. Expressed permission must be requested in cases where entry is needed when the curtains are closed. An entry without permission is a transgression and entails some sort of natural retribution.

With regards to space and dominion, there appears to be no distinction between the public and private realms, and thus, "the Western concept of privacy, domestic or otherwise, is not to be found". This concept is also shared by the rural Malays, of whom, many are descended from mixed marriages with the Semais and other Orang Asli people. They carry with them the wisdom and lore of the Semais, including their non-violent and pacifist tendencies, harmonized with other prevailing religions of their adoption.

=== Marriage ===
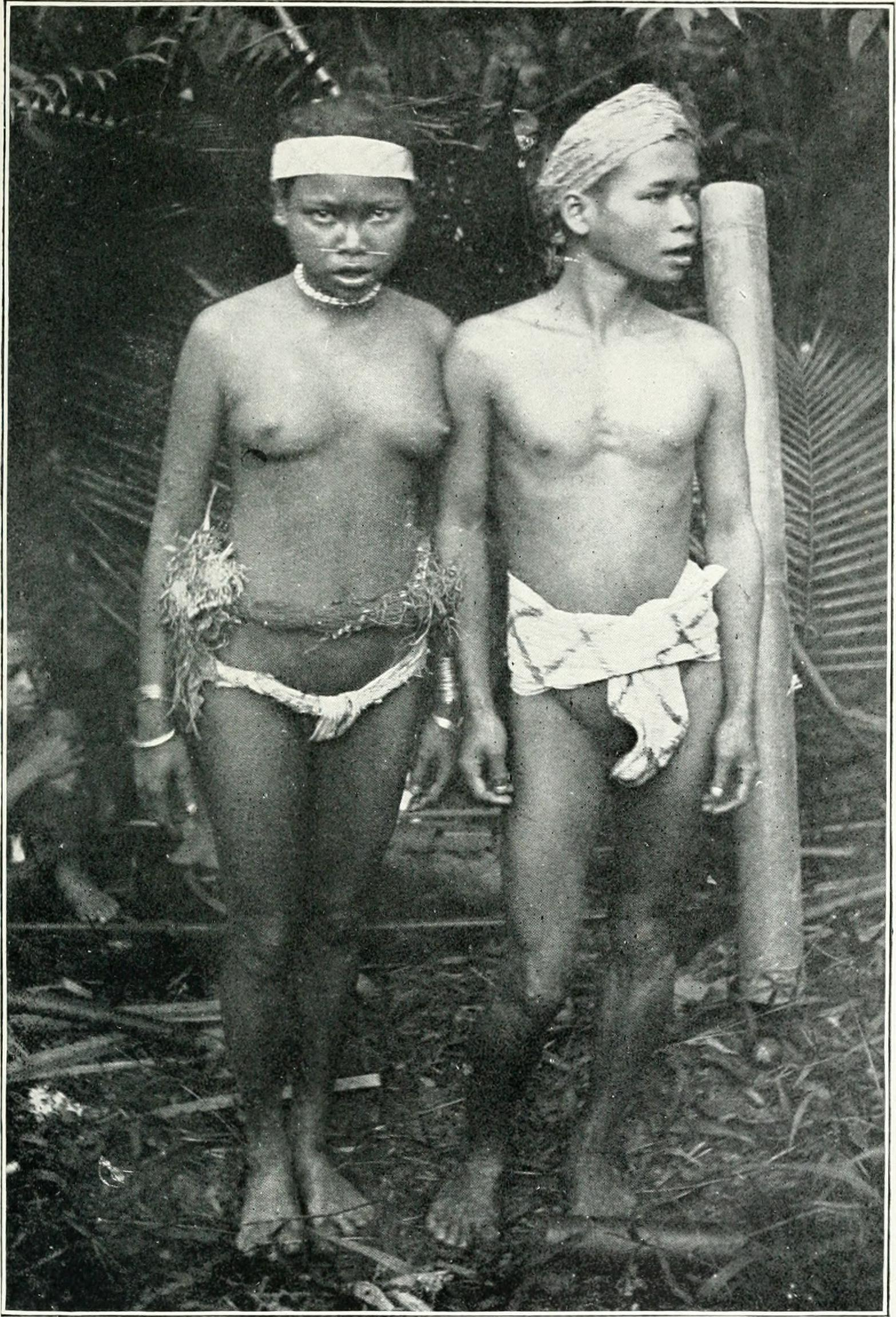
Newly married Semai couple; woman with painted head-band and nose-quill in Ulu Itam, Perak, 1906.

The vast majority of Semai marriages are monogamous. Less than five percent of women are married polygynously. Semai marriages are exogamous: East Semai may not marry consanguineal kinsman, or blood relations, and West Semai are not supposed to marry anybody who descended from one of his grandparents. Therefore, in most marriages, the couples are from different settlements. This might be the reason why Semai tend to have an ambilocal residence pattern after marriage, or shuttle between living with the wife or husband's kinsman every few weeks, slowly lengthening the time period stayed until the couple decides to settle down. One reason the Semai give for shuttling between residences is homesickness. Even after settling down, couples occasionally separate, "going on week- or month-long visits to his or her consanguineal kinsman". The ambilocal residence pattern may also explain why few marriages are polygynous, for both practical reasons in managing travel and because couples tend to separate after long periods of living apart, and divorce and remarriages are fairly common.

=== Non-violence ===
The Semai are known for their extremely low levels of violence. While there is some violence amongst the Semai, it is reportedly rare; writing in 2004, Robert Dentan reported only four murders had occurred since the 1970s, though the Semai could be reluctant to disclose information about fighting. It has been suggested that the Semai's non-violence is a response to historic threats from slaving states; as the Semai were constantly defeated by slavers and Malaysian immigrants, they preferred to flee rather than fight, and this evolved into a general norm of non-violence. The Semai value "getting along", and avoid violence by having a high tolerance for bad behaviour in order to prevent conflict. The Semai generally attribute learning to argue as a consequence of outsider influences, such as schools, though arguments amongst the Semai predate such contact; the Semai's self-image does not tolerate the admission of being argumentative, aggressive or angry.

This does not mean the Semai are incapable of violence however; during the Malayan Emergency, the British recruited some Semai to fight against communist insurgents and Dentan argues the Semai believe that as Malaysia industrialises, it will be harder for the Semai to use their strategy of fleeing and they will have to fight instead. In addition, Bruce Knauft argues that while Dentan reported only two murders between 1955 and 1977, this was in the context of a study population of 300 and would give a homicide rate of 30.3 per 100,000 people, three times higher than the United States in the 1990s (though this has been contested due to issues concerning the relevant base population, which could yield substantially lower homicide estimates). Physical violence has also occasionally been known to occur over sexual jealousy.

=== Worldview ===
The Semai worldview is that they live in a hostile and dangerous world beyond their control. The jungles surrounding their villages are viewed as being full of terrifying forces and malevolent entities (to the extent that the Semai are reluctant to go into the jungles alone, especially at night). Since the Semai see themselves as helpless in a hostile world, the only source of safety and nurturance lies with their community. This is the cause of Semai's emphasis on community harmony and non-violence, as violence threatens to destroy their only perceived source of safety.

=== Punan ===
An important belief that affects many aspects of Semai culture is Punan. Punan is the idea that making somebody else unhappy, especially by imposing your own wishes or denying his or her desires, is taboo. The Semai believe that committing punan will increase the likelihood of themselves being injured physically. The importance of punan in Semai life can be seen in their food sharing norms, leadership style, method of child rearing, for example.

==== Food sharing ====
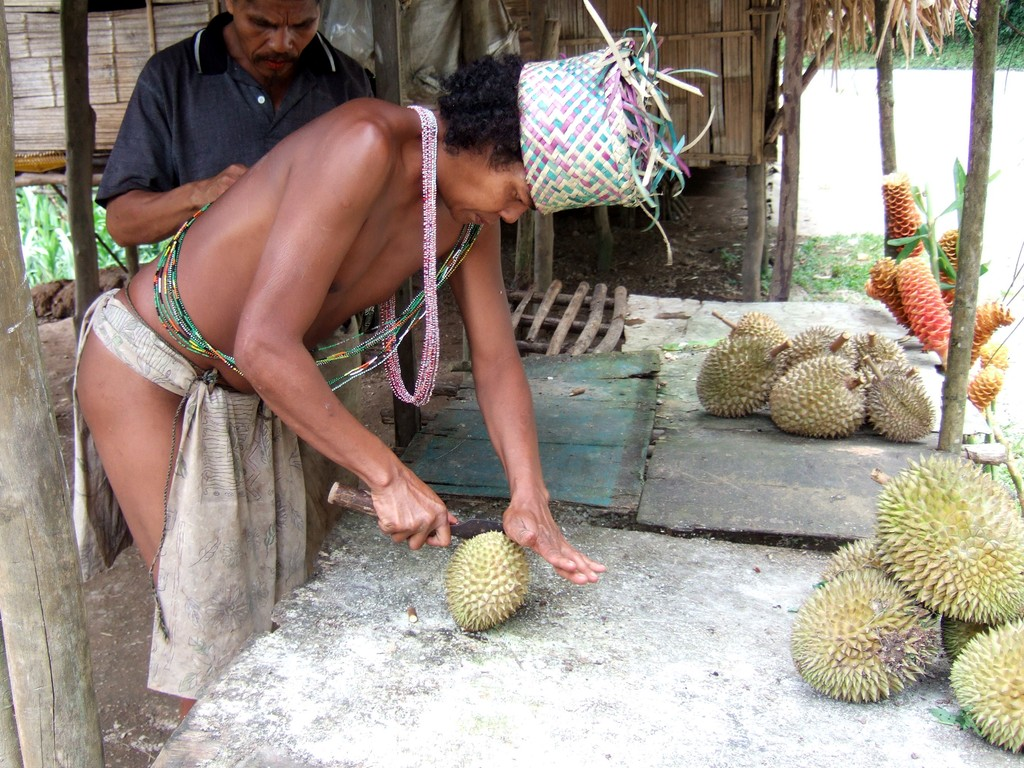
A Semai man in traditional attire opening a durian fruit in Cameron Highlands District, Pahang, Malaysia.

Food sharing, or the system by which Semai distribute food, is one of the most significant ways in which members of the community interact. When large game is caught, it is shared equally among members of the community. It is considered a social norm to share whatever one can afford. Smaller catches are shared among one's nuclear family or close neighbors. If it is a larger catch with more surplus, the meat is shared across the entire settlement. It is considered punan to refuse a request for food or to ask for more than the donor can give. This type of food sharing not only helps build relationships among the community, but also helps provide food security to individual households because it increases the probability of having a good meal each day.

==== Leadership ====
The Semai have no police and no government per se. According to Dentan, adults appear to be controlled primarily by public opinion. The Semai themselves say "There is no authority here but embarrassment." Although popular and verbally facile individuals are influential in public affairs, the Semai have no formal leaders.

Disputes in the Semai community are resolved by holding a becharaa, or public assembly, at the headman's house. This assembly may last for days and involves thorough discussion of the causes, motivations and resolution of the dispute by disputants and the whole community, ending with the headman charging either or both of the disputants not to repeat their behavior lest it endanger the community. The Semai have a saying that "there are more reasons to fear a dispute than a tiger."

==== Childhood ====
Semai children are never punished or forced against their will. If a parent asks a child to do something and the child says "I don't want to," the matter is ended. However, Semai parents use fear of strangers and violence in nature such as thunderstorms and lightning to control children's behavior if ever it becomes necessary. A concept similar to karma is also prevalent where children are told stories of sprites (mambang in Malay) and forest spirits who will take retribution if their sanctity is violated. Children also appear to be taught to fear their own aggressive impulses. The concept of mengalah or giving in is most cherished where children since young are taught to 'give way' to others so as to preserve the peace and harmony of the village. Unlike American children, who are taught to be self-reliant and courageous, Semai children are encouraged to be fearful, particularly of strangers. Because thunderstorms are particularly threatening to the Semai due to the damage they cause, when a child is angry the parents will yell "Tarlaid!" - an act that is Tarlaid is one that is said to be able to rouse the anger of spirits and bring forth natural calamities; Semai parents use the fear that accompanies these storms to encourage the children to control their own aggressive impulses. Parents may also threaten to hit their children and raise a fist or machete, though they do not actually carry out the threat, with the worst the child receiving being a tap.

The games Semai children play are non-competitive. These games include forms of sports that encourage physical activity and exertions so that the body becomes tired and are therefore made ready for sleep and the subsequent dreaming. One game involves hitting at other children with sticks; the sticks, however, always stop short a few inches from their target so that no one actually gets struck. Modern games are also played but with significant modifications. A game of badminton for example uses no partition nets and keeps no score. The shuttlecock is deliberately hit so that it could be easily intercepted by the other player and passed back, and so forth. The objective seems to be purely for exercise. Children do engage in rough and tumble play but it is extremely mild, involving minimal or no physical contact. While the Semai have no competitive games themselves, they have imported competitive games from other cultures and modified them. In games of competition, when conflict arises, they are quickly solved by deference to the older player, who is always considered right.

The Semai people is also known for their traditional Sewang dance, where it is usually performed in events such as celebrating birth, funerals, circumcision ceremony, healing of sicknesses and for other superstitions; of which some of those events can last for three to six days.

== Spirituality and beliefs ==
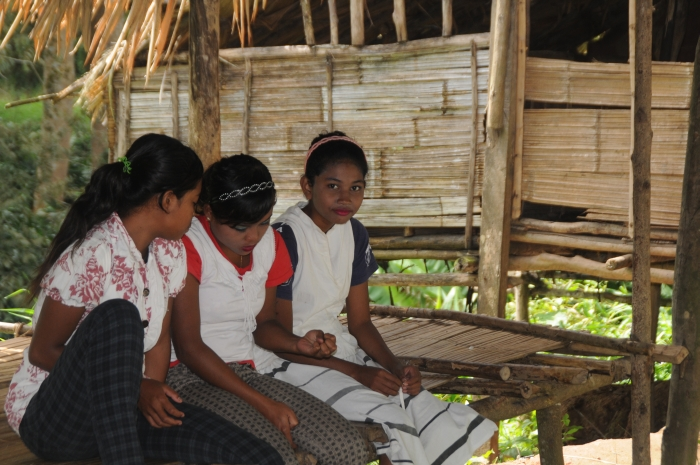
Semai teenagers in Tapah, Perak, Malaysia.

The animist traditions of the Semai include a thunder deity called Enku. A small eyeless snake is called Thunder's headband. One of the most important beings associated with thunder are the Nāga, a group of huge, subterranean dragons that ravage villages during thunder-squalls and are associated with rainbows. Chuntah is a ritual performed to make the evil spirits leave. Chuntah is performed in the middle of a storm where a man collects rain in a bamboo container until it is nearly full, then gashes his skin and lets the blood run into the container.

The Semai divide the animal world into three categories: cheb for those which have feathers or fly, 'ka for those which have rounded scales or moist skin and live in or near water, and menhar for those which live on the ground or in the trees. Menhar also includes fungi. The Semai have restrictions on eating animals that straddle two groups, for example snakes are considered inedible because they live on land (like menhar) but have scales and lack legs (like ka).

== Settlement area ==
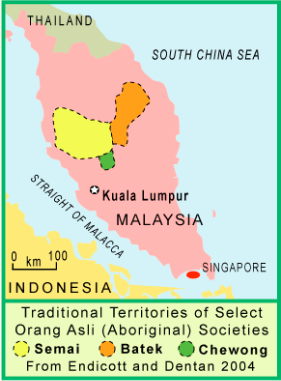
The yellow area indicates location of the Semai people in Peninsula Malaysia.

Some of the settlements that the Semai people are located includes:-

- Kampong Kuala Bot, Sungai Bot, Tapah, Perak
- Suak Padi, Padang Changkat, Parit, Perak
- Chenderiang, Tapah, Perak
- Batu 6, Batu 7 and Batu 8, Batang Padang District, Tapah, Perak
- Kampung Chinggung, Behrang Ulu, Perak
- Kampung Ulu Geruntum, Gopeng, Perak
- Kampung Batu Berangkai, Kampar District, Perak
- Kampung Orang Asli Redang Punggor, Hilir Perak District, Perak
- Kawasan Bandar Runding, Tapah, Perak
- Village settlements in South Perak, Perak
- Pos Gedong, Perak
- Kampung Orang Asli Kuala Senta, Bidor, Perak
- Rancangan Penempatan Semula Betau, Kuala Lipis, Pahang
- Sungai Ruil, Tanah Rata, Cameron Highlands District, Pahang
- Kampung Harong, Kampung Jentil, Lanai, Kampung Pantos and Kuala Medang, Kuala Lipis, Pahang
- Kampung Orang Asli Sungai Semalin, Sega, Raub, Pahang

== Population ==
The population dynamics of the Semai people in Malaysia:

Year	1960	1965	1969	1974	1980	1991	1993	1996	2000	2003	2004	2010	2020
Population	11,609	12,748	15,506	16,497	17,789	28,627	26,049	26,049	34,284	43,892	43,927	49,697	60,438

In all age groups, men tend to outnumber women, perhaps due to high mortality rates during childbirth.

== Popular culture ==
- Asli (2017), a film directed by David Liew is about a bi-racial girl on a road to rediscovering her Semai heritage. This is the first film to feature the Semai language in about 50% of the dialogue.

== Notable people ==
- Amani Williams Hunt Abdullah, lawyer and Orang Asli activist.
- Ramli Mohd Nor, former police officer and current MP for Cameron Highlands constituency.
- Bahari Belaton, dean of Universiti Sains Malaysia’s School of Computer Sciences.
