= Mah Meri people =

Mah Meri Maq Betiseq / Besisi
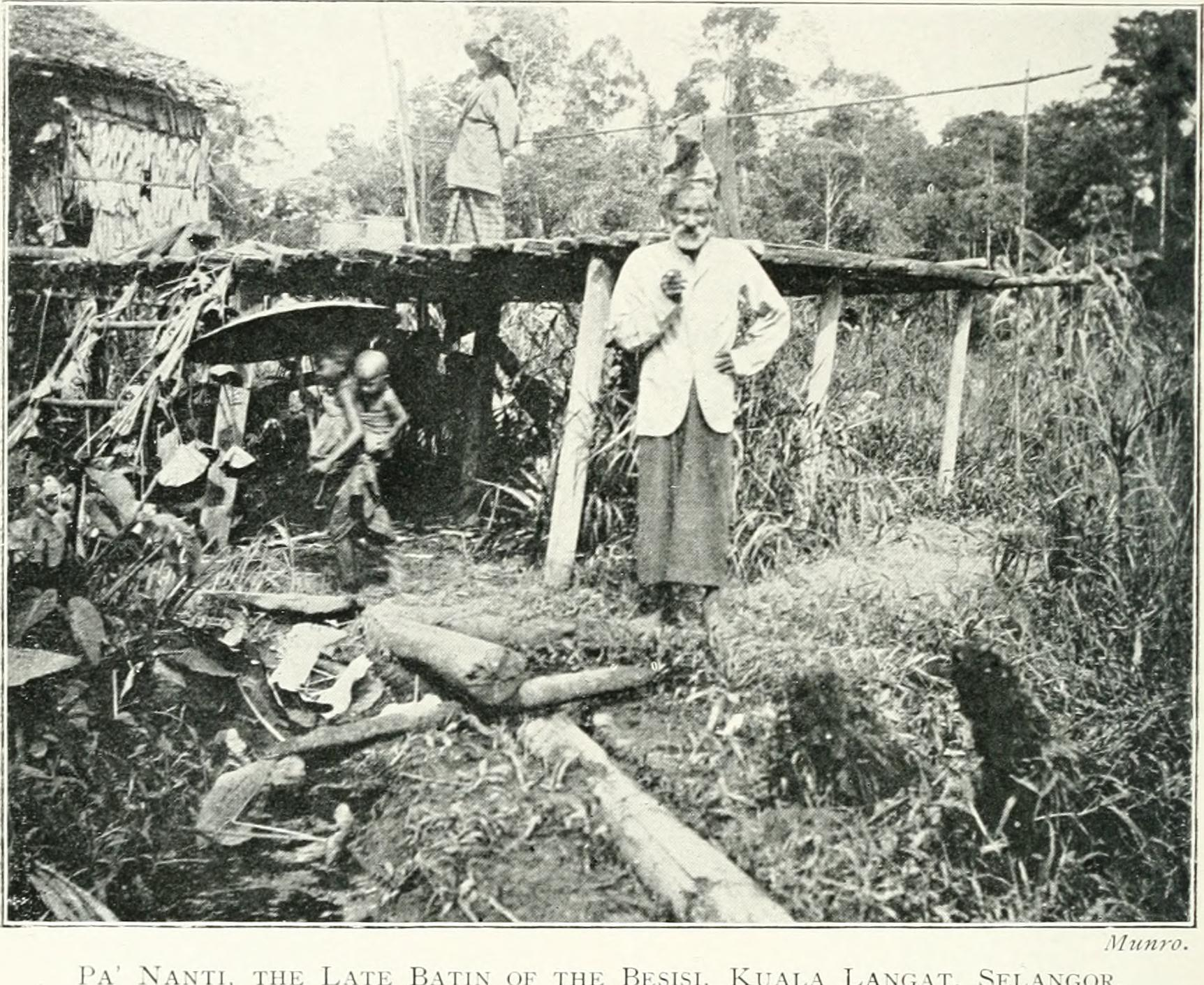
- A Batin (village chief) of the Besisi people from Kuala Langat, Selangor, Malaysia, 1906.

Total population
- 2,120 (2010)

Regions with significant populations
- Malaysia (Pulau Carey, Selangor)

Languages
- Mah Meri language, Malay language

Religion
- Forest & Natural Spirituality, a type of Animism and a significant population practicing Islam or Christianity

Related ethnic groups
- Semaq Beri people, Semelai people, Temoq people

The Mah Meri are an ethnic group native to western part of Peninsular Malaysia. They are one of the 18 Orang Asli groups named by the Malaysian government. They are of the Senoi subgroup. Most of the members of the Mah Meri tribe live along the coast of South Selangor from Sungai Pelek up to Pulau Carey, although there is at least one Mah Meri Community on the other side of the Klang River.

According to the Orang Asli Office of the Malaysian government, they numbered around 2,200 in 2005. Most of the Mah Meri live in small villages (kampungs) on the fringes of other cities and on Pulau Carey, which has five separate villages of Mah Meri.

The Mah Meri people of Pulau Carey are internationally well known for their traditional wood carving skills.

== History ==
Their ancestors are believed to be associated with the arrival of Austro-Asiatic migrants associated with the emergence of fire-cutting agriculture on the Malay Peninsula and the emergence of rice. Due to cultural exchanges and trade, some Mah Meri and Senoi have intermixed with local Negrito tribes.

== Population ==
The changes in the Mah Meri population are as the following:

Historical population
Year	Pop.	±% p.a.
1960	1,898	—
1965	1,212	−8.58%
1969	1,198	−0.29%
1974	1,356	+2.51%
1980	1,389	+0.40%
1993	2,185	+3.55%
1996	2,185	+0.00%
2000	3,503	+12.52%
2003	2,986	−5.18%
2004	2,856	−4.35%
2005	2,200	−22.97%
2010	2,120	−0.74%

== Definition ==
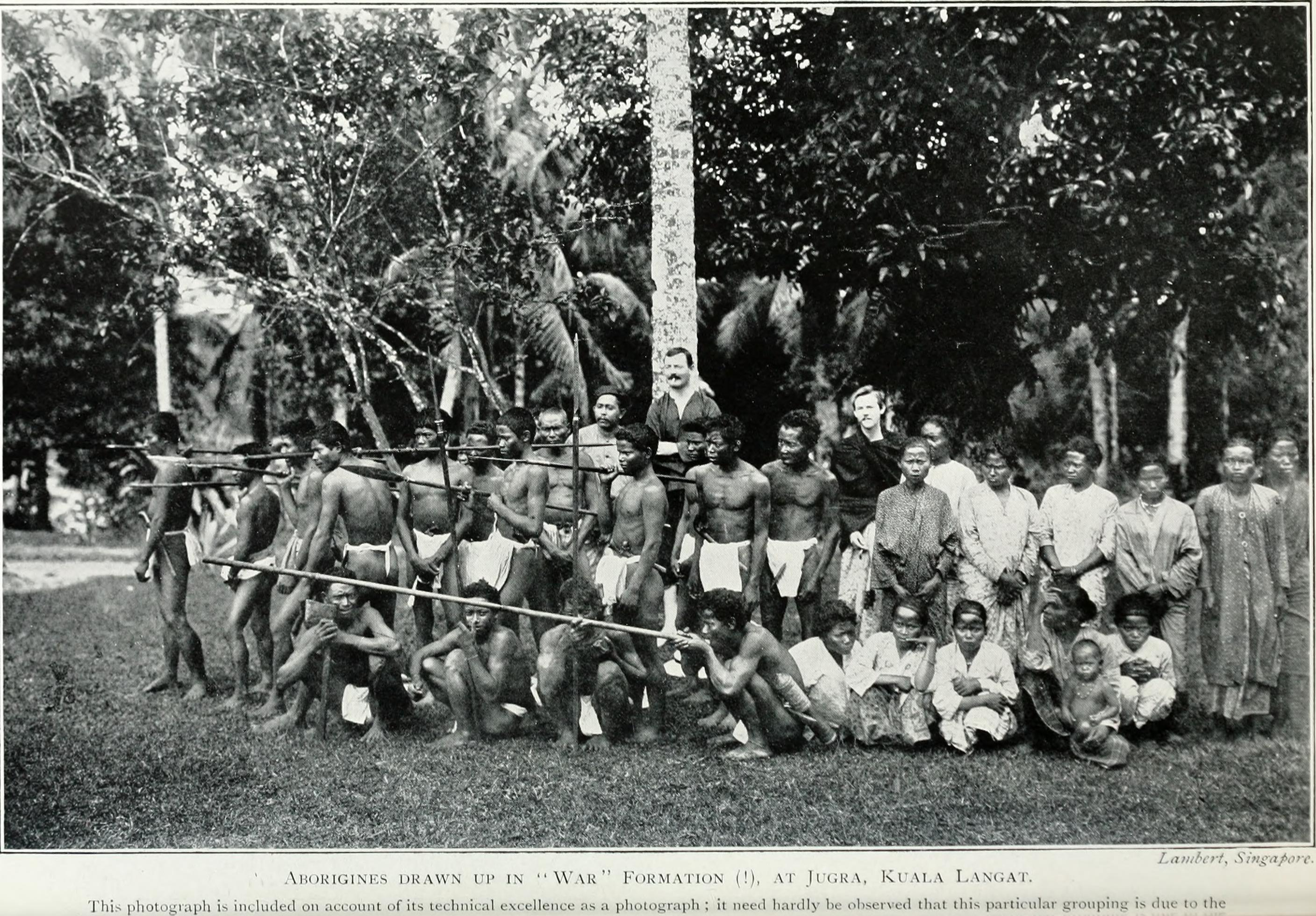
A group forming a "war formation" in Jugra, Kuala Langat, Selangor, Malaysia, 1906.

Mah Meri in Mah Meri language means "Jungle people" (Mah = people, Meri = jungle)., while in another term the meaning of the name means Bersisik (meaning, "scaly" in Malay language) or Persisir (meaning, "coastal" in Malay language). They are also considered as Orang Laut due to them residing in settlements that are nearby seasides and work as fishermen. They are believed to have migrated from the islands in southern Johor to the coastal shores of Selangor in order to escape from their enemies. Their oral histories suggest that their distribution once reached as far south as Batu Pahat.

Today Mah Meri community has undergone changes in terms of mentality and development as a result of integrating with other neighbouring communities.

== Language ==
The Mah Meri language, also called Besisi, is an Austroasiatic language. It is part of Southern Aslian sub-branch of Aslian languages, and is related to Semelai, Temoq and Semaq Beri. There are an estimated 3,000 people still speaking the language, but it is seriously endangered.

== Culture ==
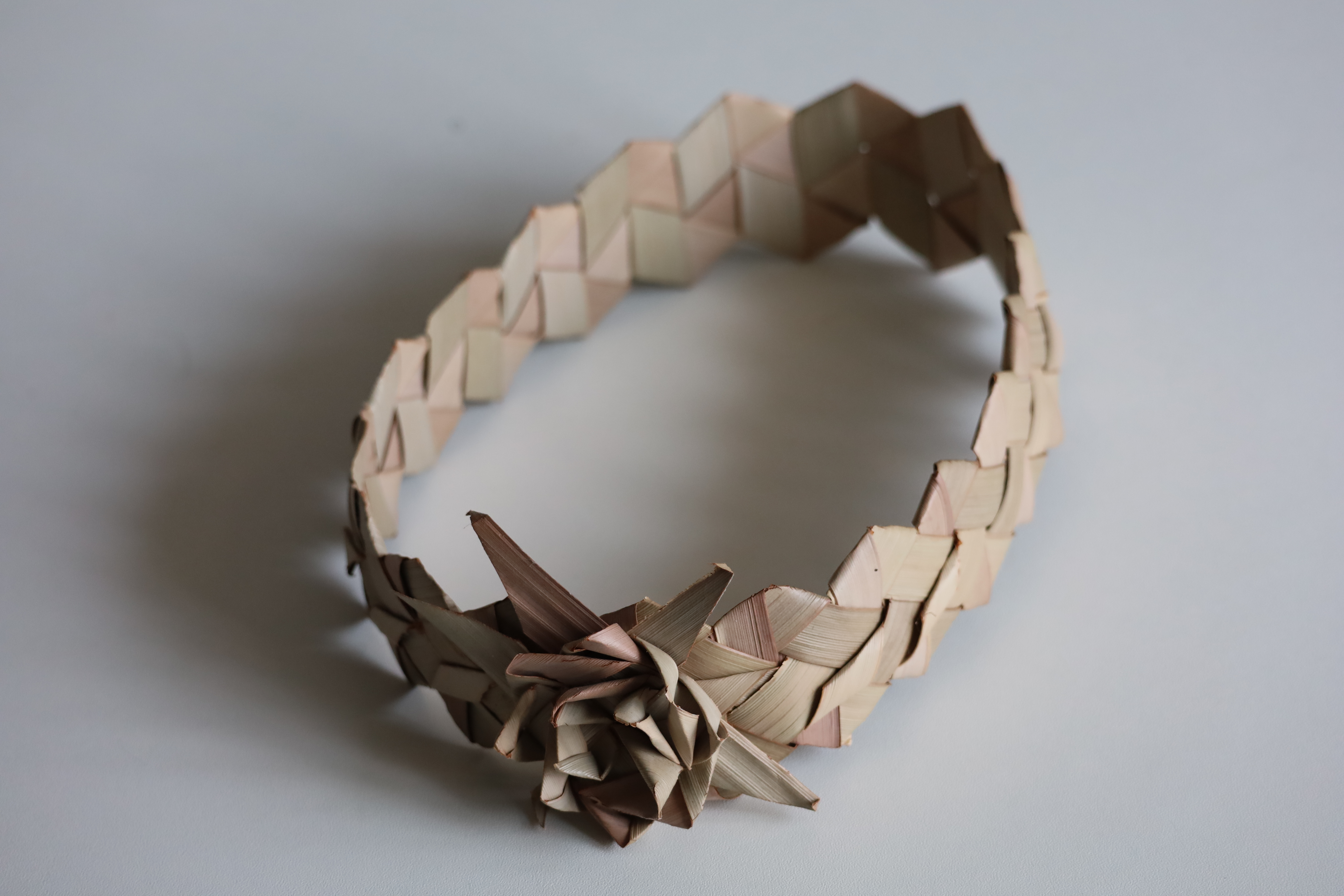
A Mah Meri daun nipah style tempok, a traditional headgear of the Orang Asli.

=== Carving ===
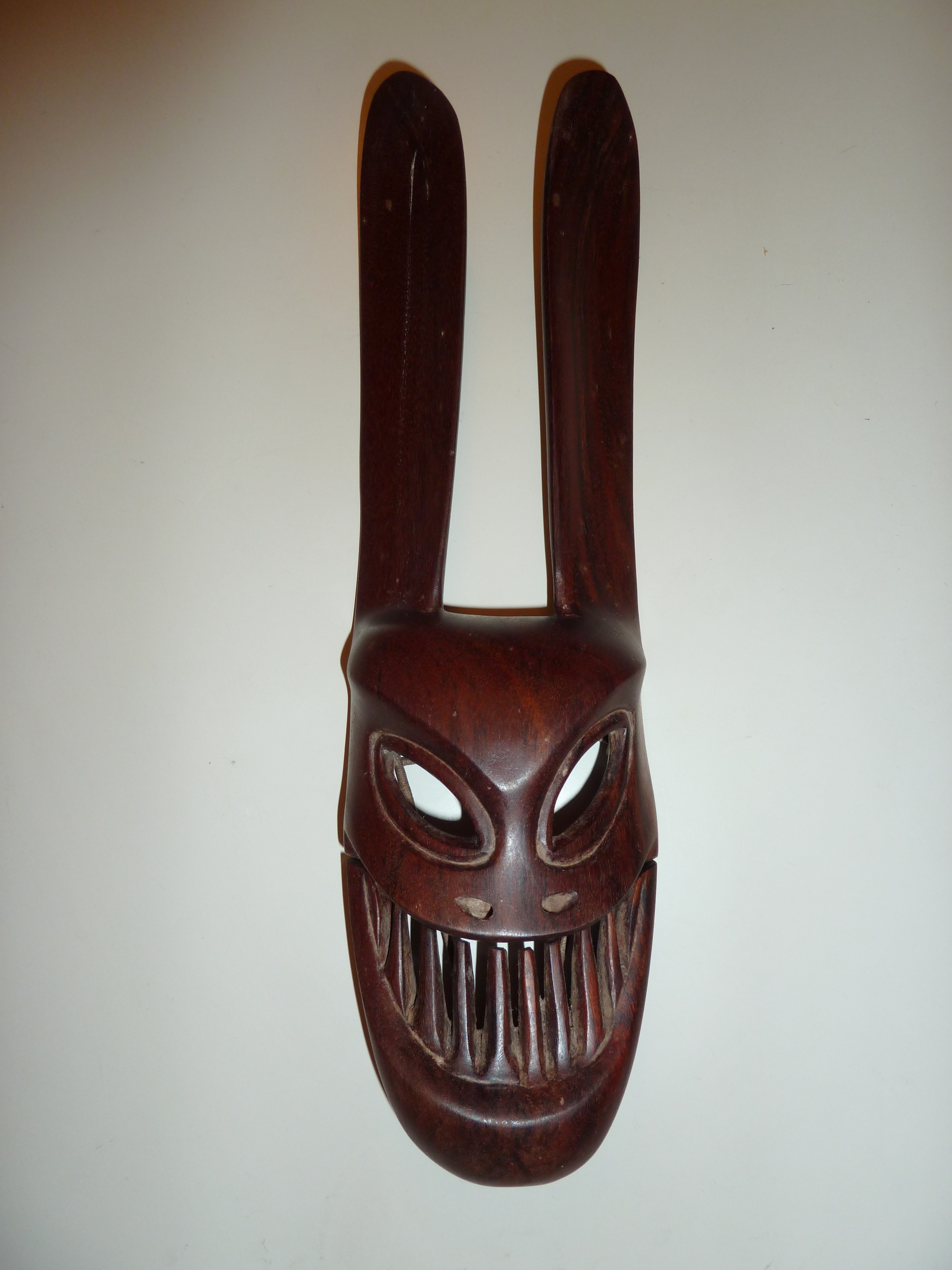
Mah Meri spider spirit mask.

Many among them are skilled in carving statues that are made from wood. Their carvings include deities, humans, flora and fauna figurines. These carvings have gained recognition from the UNESCO. Handicrafts produce of the Mah Meri community in Sungai Bumbun, Kuala Langat have high artistic value and the potential to be recognised at an international level.

=== Traditional dances ===
- Sewang dance
- Tarian Jo'oh (Jungle dance)
- Tarian Topeng (Mask dance)

== Political organization ==
In common with other Orang Asli Villages, each kampung elects its own Batin (Village Headman) and a council of "elders" to represent the people living in the kampung. The Batin is paid an annual salary by the Malaysian government. The Bomoh, who functions as a shaman in their society, plays an important role in the kampung. Main puteri (meaning "Playing princess"), a dying ritualistic form of treatment due to Islamisation; is performed by the Mah Meri shaman to rejuvenate patients with emotional depression, physical fatigue or psychological problems caused by metaphysical forces.

== Settlement area ==
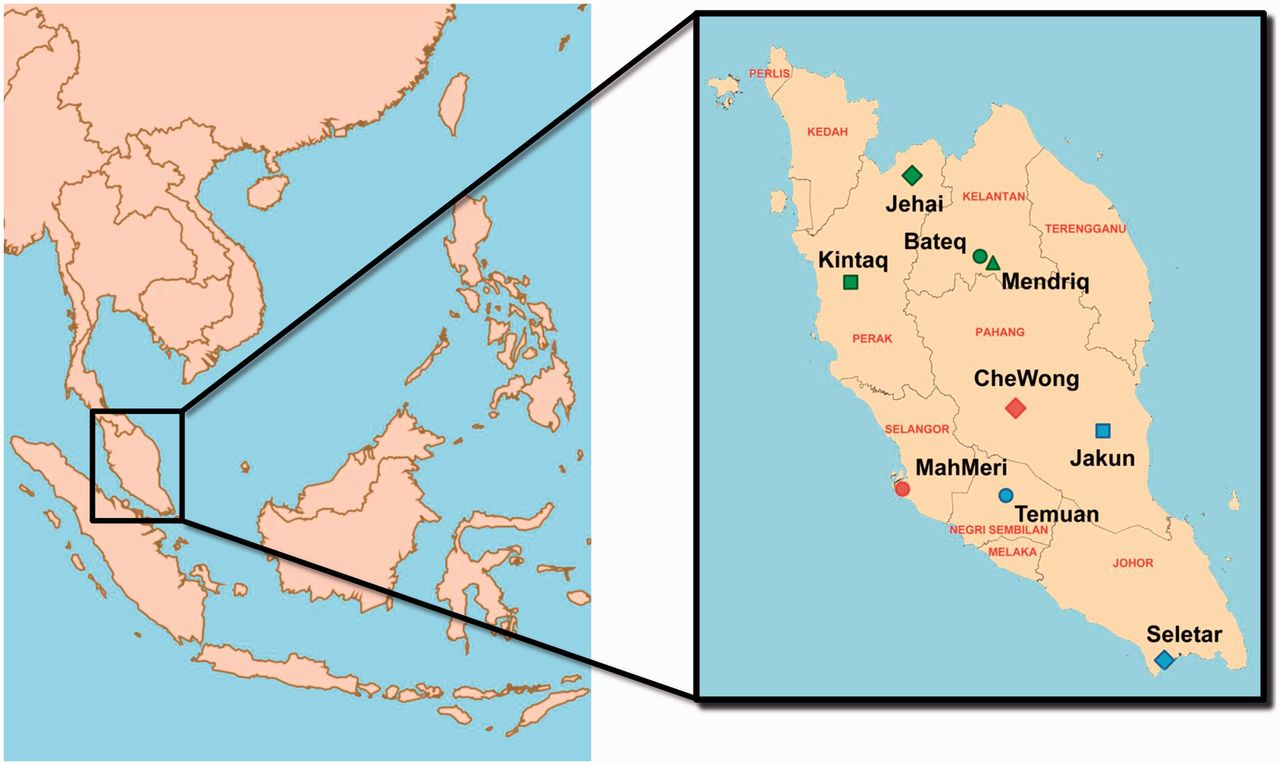
Geographical location of Mah Meri people (located in west coast of Selangor) and other Orang Asli communities in Peninsular Malaysia.

Major settlements of the Mah Meri people are:-

Name of Kampung	Nearest Town
Kampung Orang Asli Bukit Bangkong	Sungai Pelek Kampung Orang Asli, Tanjung Sepat
Kampung Orang Asli Sungei Kurau	Pulau Carey
Kampung Orang Asli Sungei Judah	Pulau Carey
Kampung Orang Asli Sungei Bumbun	Pulau Carey
Kampung Orang Asli Sungei Jugra	Pulau Carey
