= Sungai Pelek =

Town in Malaysia

Coordinates: 2°39′N 101°43′E

Sungai Pelek town

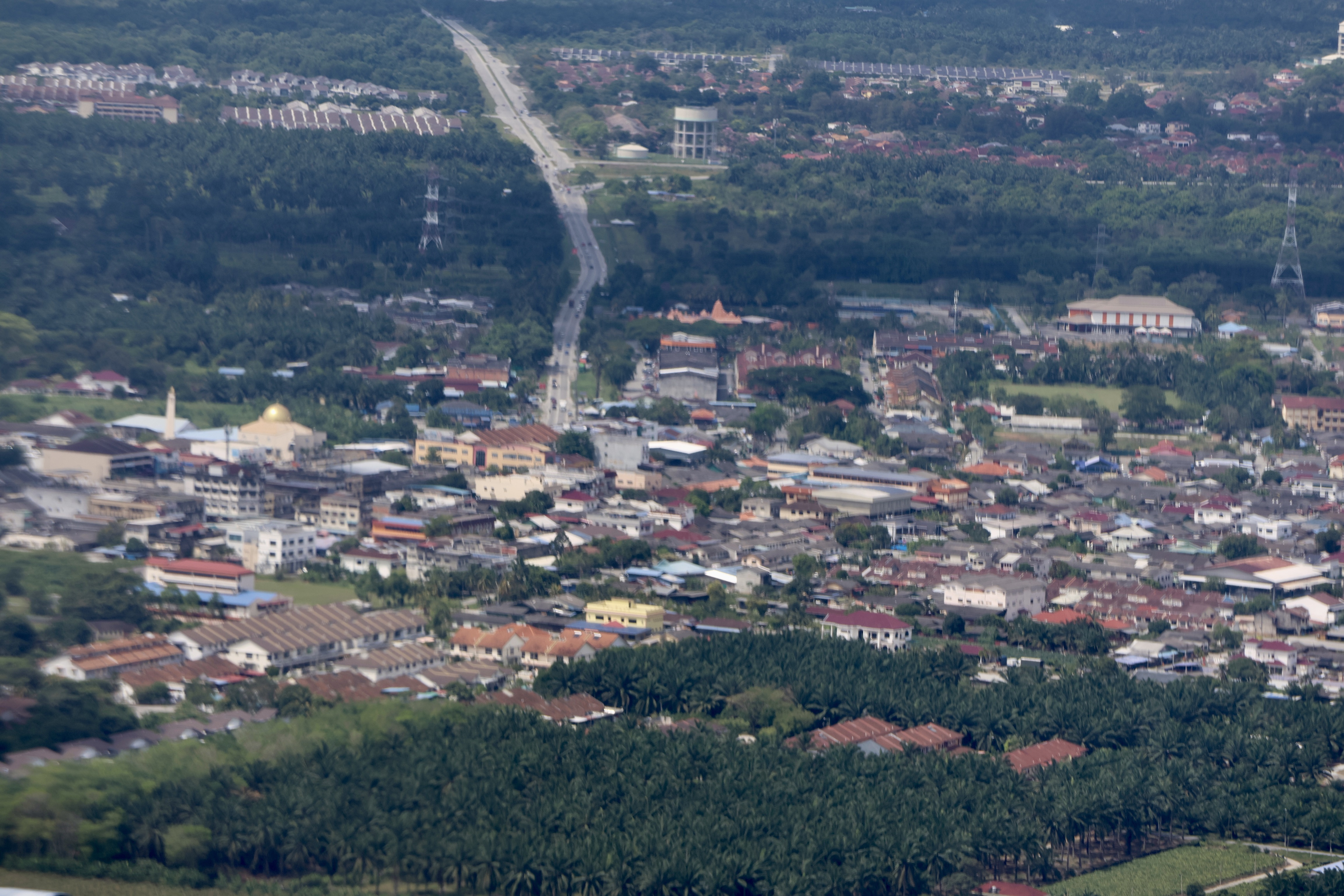
Aerial view of Sungai Pelek in 2023

Sungai Pelek is a town in Sepang District, Selangor, Malaysia. The town is located about 20 minutes from the Sepang International Circuit and about 25 minutes from the Kuala Lumpur International Airport. The town is near Bagan Lalang beach. It has numerous mangrove forests and the local clay supports a thriving brick-making industry.

== Etymology ==
Local legend has it that Sungai Pelek got its name from the temporary river formed by the overflow of the Sungai Sepang and Sungai Sepang Kecil during high tide. In the local Malay dialect, "sungai" meant "river, and "pelek" meant "strange" or "unusual".

This "strange/unusual" river lasted only for as long as the high tide, as most of the water would have drained out to sea by low tide.

Another source suggests that the name comes from the Mah Meri language, the vernacular of the indigenous Orang Asli native to the area known as the Mah Meri people. In the Mah Meri language, "pelek" means "fruit" ("buah" in Malay). It was believed that the Mah Meri Orang Asli first identified this area with their language when they stumbled upon trees that bearing fruits along the river.

Sungai Pelek have a sizable Chinese community and the Chinese call the place 五支. It is equivalent to "Batu lima" in Malay or "5th Miles" in English. However, no one - even the Malay themselves, call the place "Batu Lima". One possible explanation for this could be the name "Sungai Pelek" predates her "Batu" naming and as the area have no Chinese name when the Chinese immigrants moved in, they adopted the British way of naming the place, instead of Mah Meri people's. The naming comes from the old bristle connecting Sepang and Telok Merbau, with Sepang old town as the starting point. Several early settlements along the road also carry this naming convention in Chinese, such as 一支港 ("Batu satu", area around Sungai Kelembai) and 四支馬來村 ("Batu empat", also known as Kampung Jelutong Indah today).

== History ==
During the Second World War, Sungai Pelek was under the control of the Japanese. There was active local resistance to the Japanese occupation. Some British military personnel were trapped in Sungai Pelek by the advancing Japanese forces. These British soldiers were aided in their escape by Mr Lim Yee Ko and his friends.

The Communist insurgency during the 1950s, also known colloquially as "The Emergency", saw the building of a chain-link fence around the village. Up until the 1970s, remnants of the fence could still be seen around the village but these are now largely overgrown or have been torn down to make way for the burgeoning population growth.

=== Notable Village Headman ===
Ong Eng Siang, PJK (1910–1989)

A strong leader and looked up to by most of the villagers. He was often being sought to help solve problems faced by individuals or families in Sungai Pelek.

Ong Eng Siang was given a walking stick by Sir Gerald Templer as a symbol of respect and "authority to cane" the Assistant District Officers (ADOs) should they not do their job well.

Sir Gerald Templer was in Sungai Pelek with his military trucks to evict and remove the villagers to other locations just to overcome the British frustrations of Sungai Pelek being heavily infested with communist guerillas and their sympathisers.

The villagers were suspected to be frequent suppliers of food and medicine materials to the communist guerillas. In order to eliminate this chain, Sir Gerald Templer was adamant to evict and re-distribute the villagers to other areas.

Ong Eng Siang was among the then village community leaders to convince and appeal to Sir Gerald Templer to change his decision and to understand the problems faced by the villagers who had to scratch for a living at the fringes of the forests, risking their lives daily should they be confronted by communist guerillas.

The villagers knew too well that the security forces of the government could never protect them every day from the communist guerillas. Therefore, they had to oblige reluctantly with fear for their lives and family members, to supply rations whenever the villagers were asked to do so by the communist guerillas.

Communist guerillas also did do their rounds, knocking on doors in the village, in the wee hours of the night to source for rations.

Therefore, Sir Gerald Templer had to acknowledged the legitimate fears and dilemma faced by the villagers of Sungai Pelek. In order to reduce constant contact between the villagers and communist guerillas, Sir Gerald Templer ordered the village to be completely fenced-up around its perimeters, leaving a few gates strategically located as entrances. These gates were heavily guarded by police and home guards.

== Demographics ==
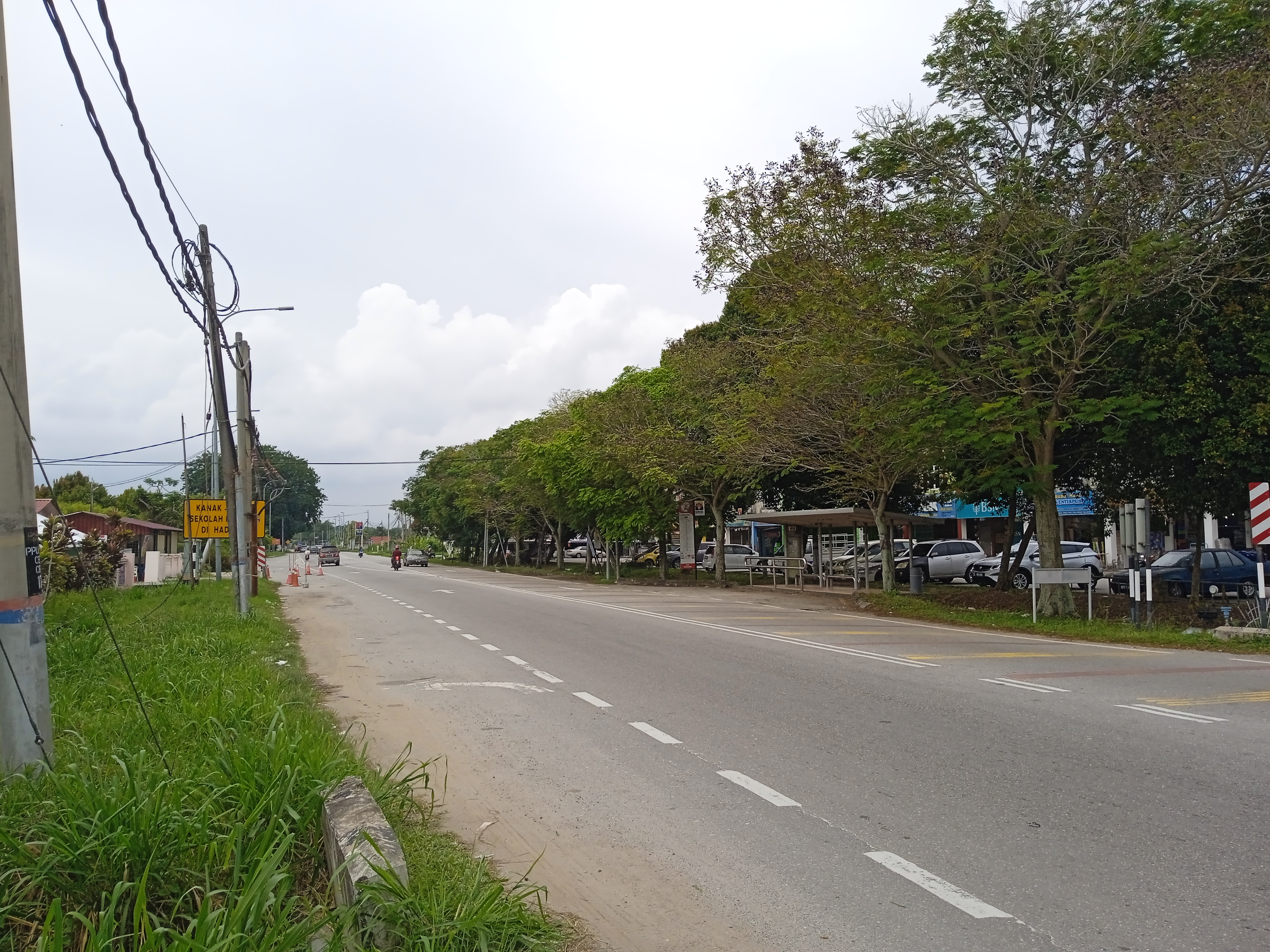
The main road in Sungai Pelek, Route 5.

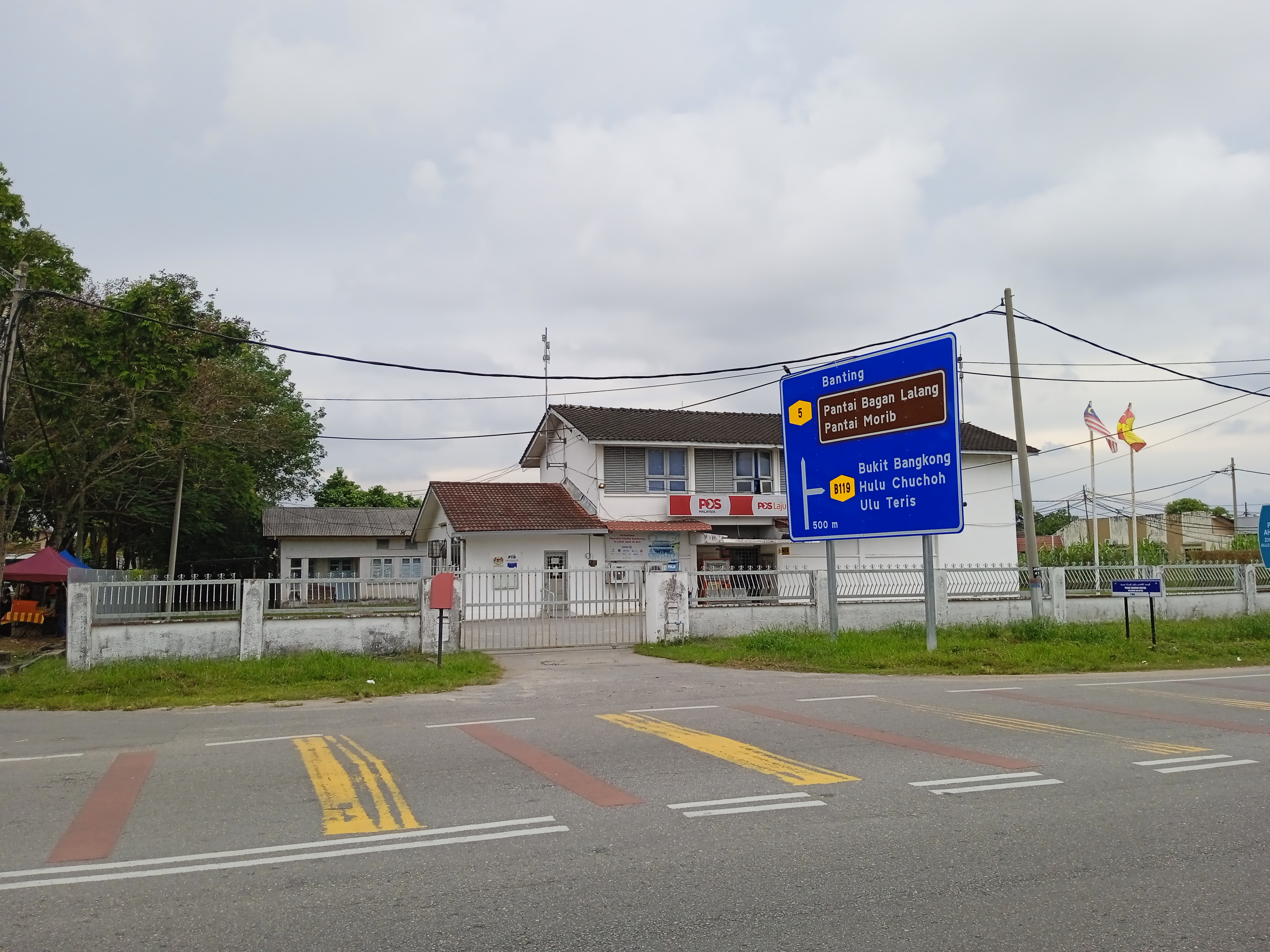
A Pos Malaysia post office in Sungai Pelek.

The population of this village is predominantly Chinese of Hokkien and Foochowese origin with a significant Hakka minority majority. There are also ethnic Malays, who are mainly of ethnic Javanese/Sumatran Malay descent, and Indians, who are a mixture of Tamils, Telugus, Punjabis, Singhalese, Malayalis and Bengalis, in this small town.

The Chinese population are mainly found in the New Village settlements and various housing developments in the area.

Around the village area, there are some smaller settlements like Bukit Bangkong, Batu Empat, Batu Dua, Teluk Merbau and Sepang Kecil.

Bukit Bangkong was once a small aboriginal settlement, which now houses a predominantly ethnic Malay population of Javanese descent.

Batu Empat and Batu Dua are two small Malay settlements on the road to Sepang town proper from Sungai Pelek.

There are few small Indian settlements built by the local palm oil company. The settlements consisted of dwellings mainly occupied by Tamil-speaking Indians, with some Malays and small number of Chinese.

=== Religion ===
The main religious communities in Sungai Pelek are split between Buddhists, Taoists, Hindus, Methodist Christians and Muslims. There are also a small number of Catholic Christians and Sikhs.

In Sungai Pelek, there are several Chinese temples like Long Shan Ting Temple (雙溪比力龙山亭) and Boo Teck Tong Temple (雙溪比力武德堂-元帥爺公). Xuan Tian Gong Temple (雙溪比力玄天宫) is located inside the main town.

Bodhivana Monastery (Buddhist Education Centre) is located at Sungai Pelek, Sepang near the Avani Sepang Gold Coast Resort. The centre is guided by Bhante Dhammapala, and it is to promote Buddhism and to benefit the community through Buddhist Education, Meditation, Arts and Community Engagement. There are also other Buddhist groups like Sungai Pelek Buddhist Association (双溪比力佛教会) and their youth group, Sg Pelek Young Buddhist Society (双溪比力佛教会青少年团).

Sungai Pelek also consist of other places of worship like a small Methodist church preaching in Chinese, a Catholic chapel situated behind the Post Office building, a mosque for the local Muslims. Sri Ganesha Indian temple is located approximately 300 meters from the main town, neighbouring Taman Sri Sungai Pelek. The Dewi Sri Karumariamman temple also located 150 meters from the main town, neighbouring Taman Aman and Taman Sentosa.

== Education ==
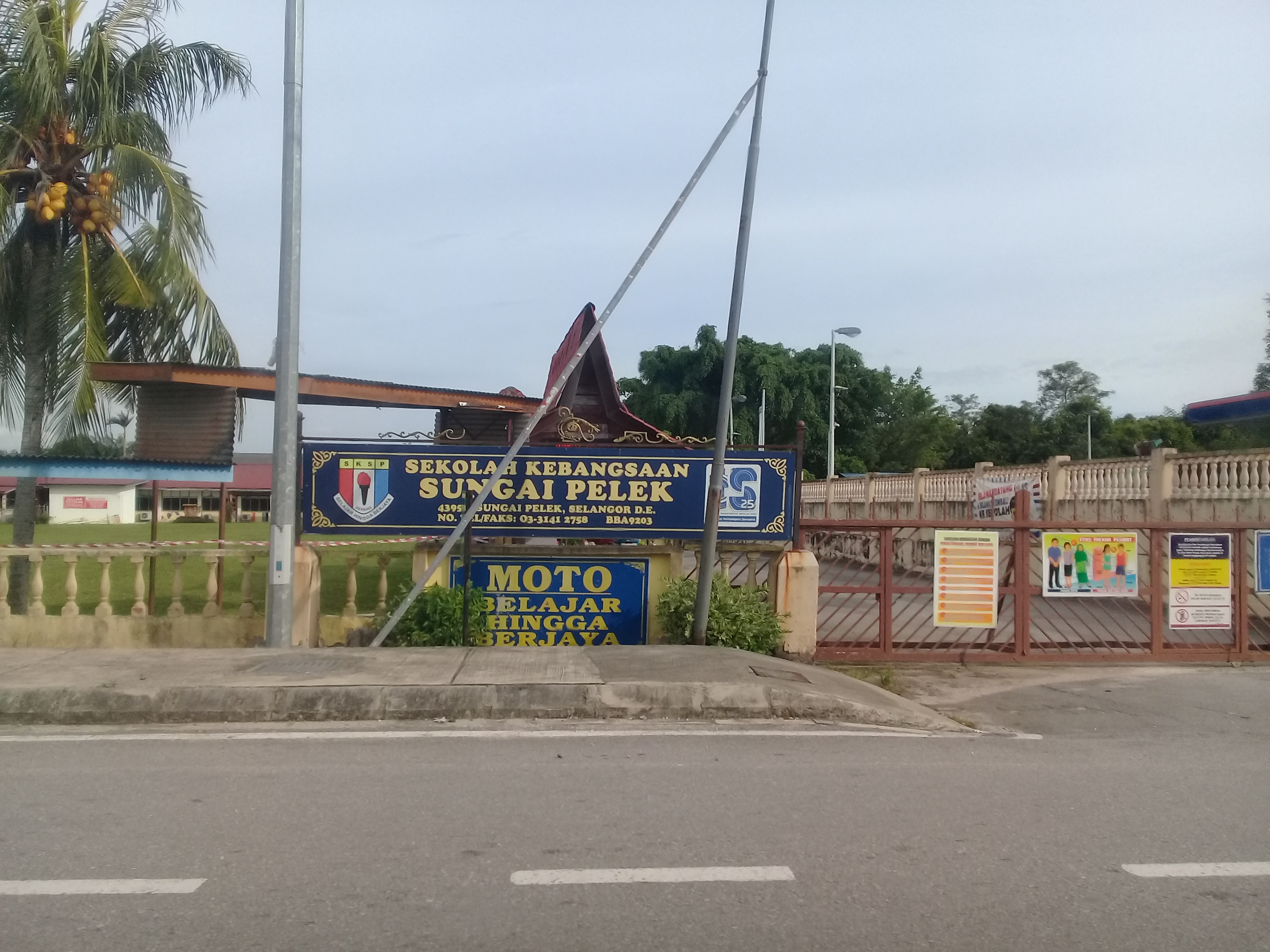
SK Sungai Pelek

Sungai Pelek has several schools which serve the local community. These schools provide educational instruction in Bahasa Malaysia, English, Chinese and Tamil. The educational level of these schools ranges from primary education to secondary education, as well as pre-university education (STPM) at Sekolah Menengah Kebangsaan Sungai Pelek.

== Economy ==
Besides its thriving brick-making and clay products industry, Sungai Pelek has numerous small plantations of rubber trees, coffea plants and oil palms. It is home to the prized teka, tawa and pinoh durians. Recently, dragon fruit has also been planted widely here. The people of Sungai Pelek are active in the bird's nest industry as well.
