= Temiar people =

Temiar people Orang Temiar / Mai Sero'
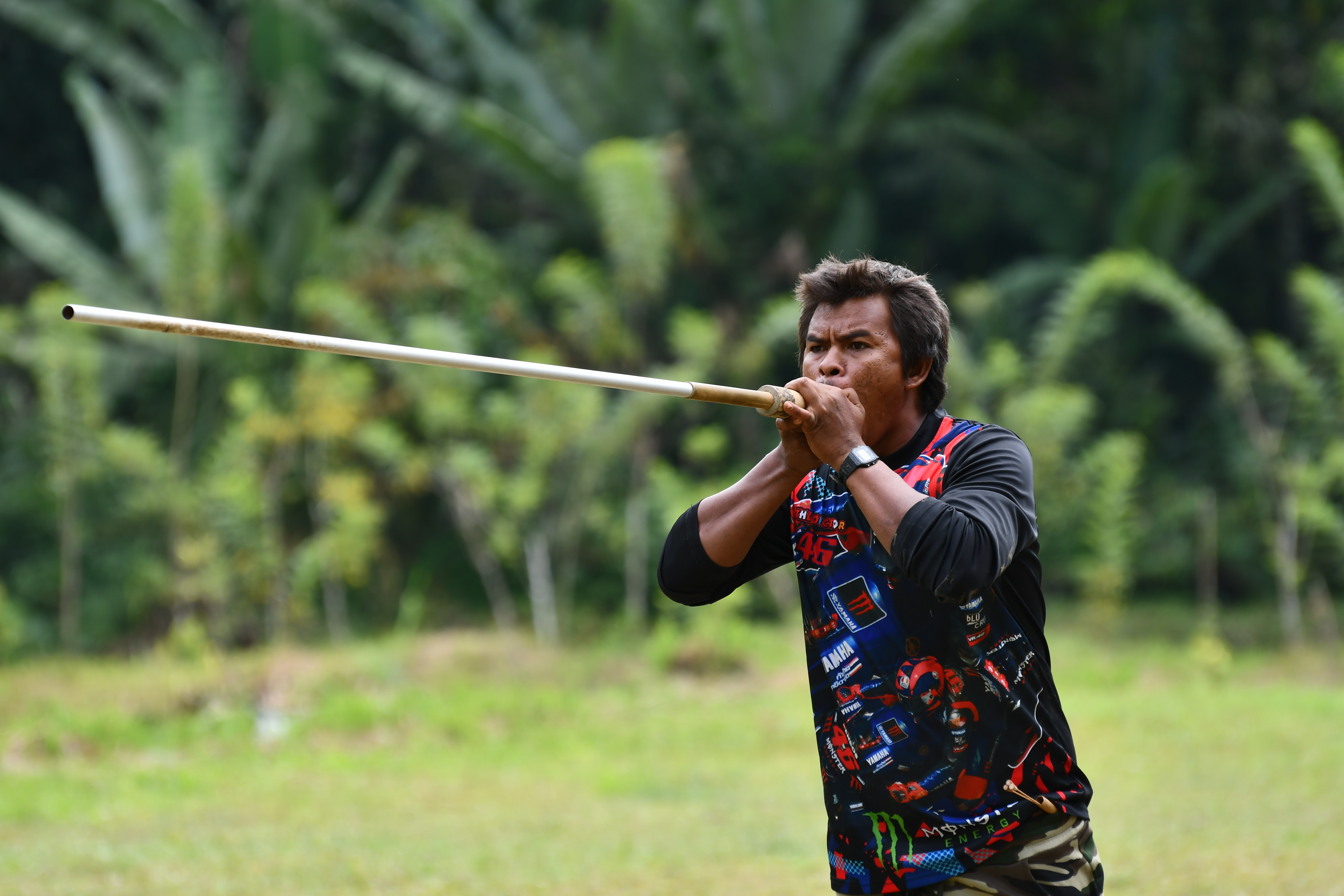

Total population
- 40,000–120,000

Regions with significant populations
- Malaysia (Perak, Pahang, Kelantan)

Languages
- Temiar language, Malay language

Religion
- Traditional Religion, Islam, Christianity

Related ethnic groups
- Semai people

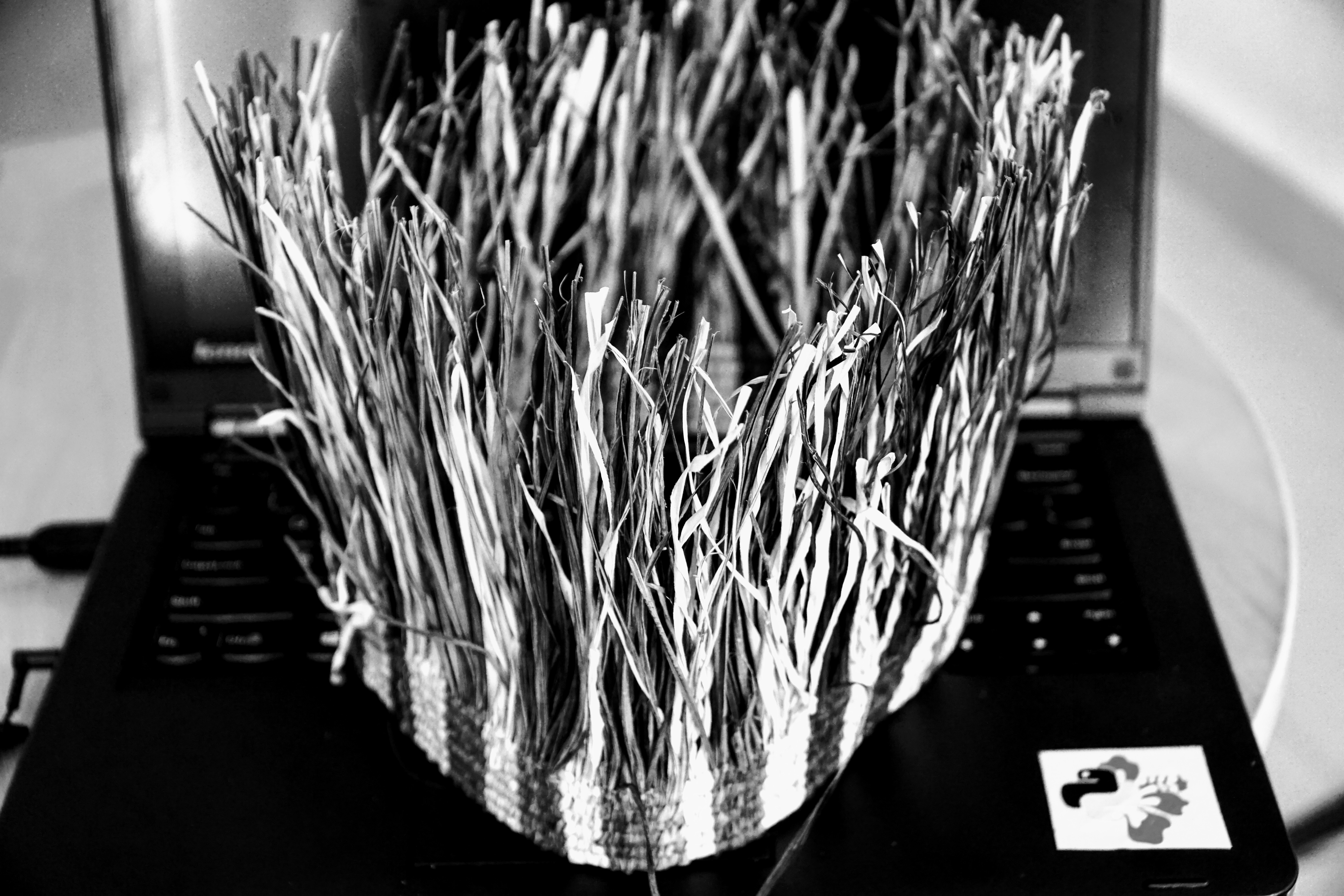
A Temiar headdress.

The Temiar are a Senoic group indigenous to the Malay Peninsula and one of the largest of the eighteen Orang Asli groups of Malaysia. They reside mainly in Perak, Pahang and Kelantan. Their total population is estimated at around 40,000 to 120,000, most of which live on the fringes of the rainforest, while a small number have been urbanised.

Temiar are traditionally animists. The ceremonial Sewang dance is performed by the Temiar people as part of their folk beliefs.

== Population ==
The changes in the population of the Temiar people are as the following:

Year	1930s	1960	1965	1969	1974	1980	1991	1993	1996	2000	2003	2004	2010
Population	2,000	8,945	9,325	9,929	10,586	12,365	16,892	15,122	15,122	17,706	25,725	25,590	30,118

== Culture ==
=== Traditional food ===
- Nasi serempad, rice cooked in bamboo
- Umbut Bayas Masak Gulai, pith curry
- Pucuk Paku Peno’ol, vegetable pucuk paku fern, tapioca leaves and anchovies cooked in bamboo

== Settlement area ==
Major settlements of the Temiar are:

- Jeram Bertam, Kelantan
- Kampung Chengkelik, Kuala Betis, Kelantan
- Kampung Merlung, Kuala Betis, Kelantan
- Kampung Jarau Baru, Kemar, Gerik, Perak
- Kampung Sungai Cadak, Ulu Kinta, Ipoh, Perak
- Kampung Tonggang, Tanjung Rambutan, Ipoh, Perak
- Kampung Ulu Gerik, Gerik, Perak
- Pos Poi, Lasah, Sungai Siput (North), Perak
- Kampung Temakah, Sungai Siput (North), Perak
- Pos Perwor, Lasah, Sungai Siput (North), Perak
- Air Banun, Hulu Perak District, Perak
- Kemar, Gerik, Perak

== Notable people ==
- Zumika Azmi, Malaysian Cricketer
- Ramli Mohd Nor, Malaysian Politician
- Sasha Azmi, Malaysian Cricketer

== See also ==
- Dream Theory in Malaya
