= Senoic languages =

Group of indigenous languages spoken on the Malay Peninsula

Senoic
- Central Aslian; Sakai
- Geographic distribution: Peninsular Malaysia
- Ethnicity: Senoi
- Linguistic classification: Austroasiatic: Aslian; Senoic
- Subdivisions: Semai; Temiar; Lanoh; Sabüm; Semnam

Language codes
- Glottolog: seno1278
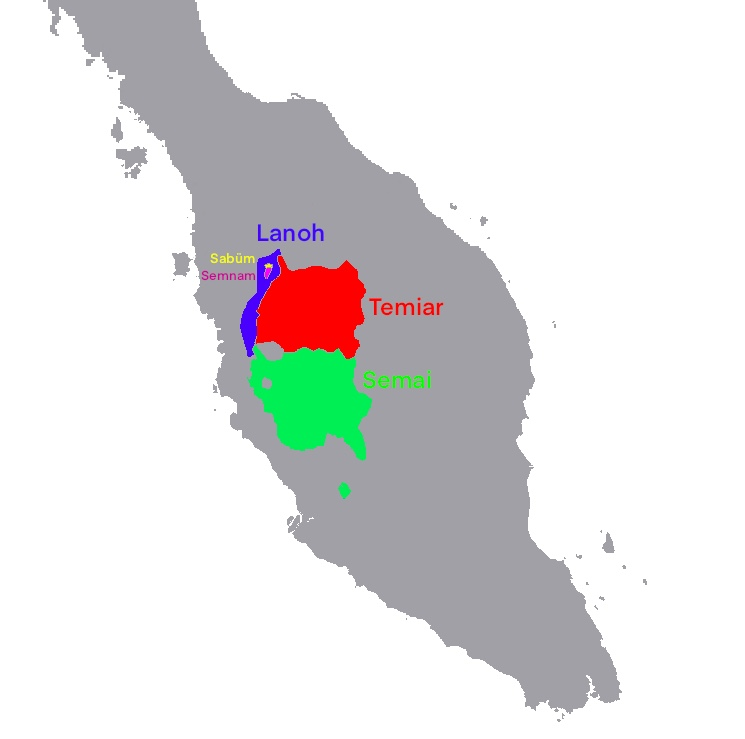

The Senoic or Central Aslian languages (also called Sakai) are a group of Aslian languages spoken by about 33,000 people in the main range of the Malay Peninsula. Languages in the group are: Semai and Temiar (the main languages), Lanoh, Sabüm, and Semnam.
