= Kampung Chinggung =

Village in Perak, Malaysia

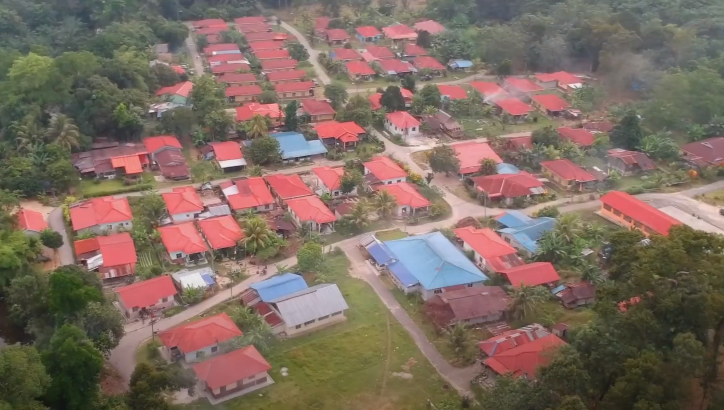
- Interactive map of Kampung Chinggung
- Coordinates: 3°46′58″N 101°30′14″E
- Country: Malaysia
- State: Perak
- District: Muallim District
- Town: Behrang
- Establishment: Around 1900s

Population
  - Total: 380 (Jun 2,009)

Kampung Chinggung is a village of Orang Asli in Behrang Station, Muallim District, Perak, Malaysia. It is approximately 5 km from Behrang Ulu. It beside on the Banjaran Chilo Titiwangsa.
