= Sewang dance =

Sewang
- Native name: Sewang
- Origin: Malaysia

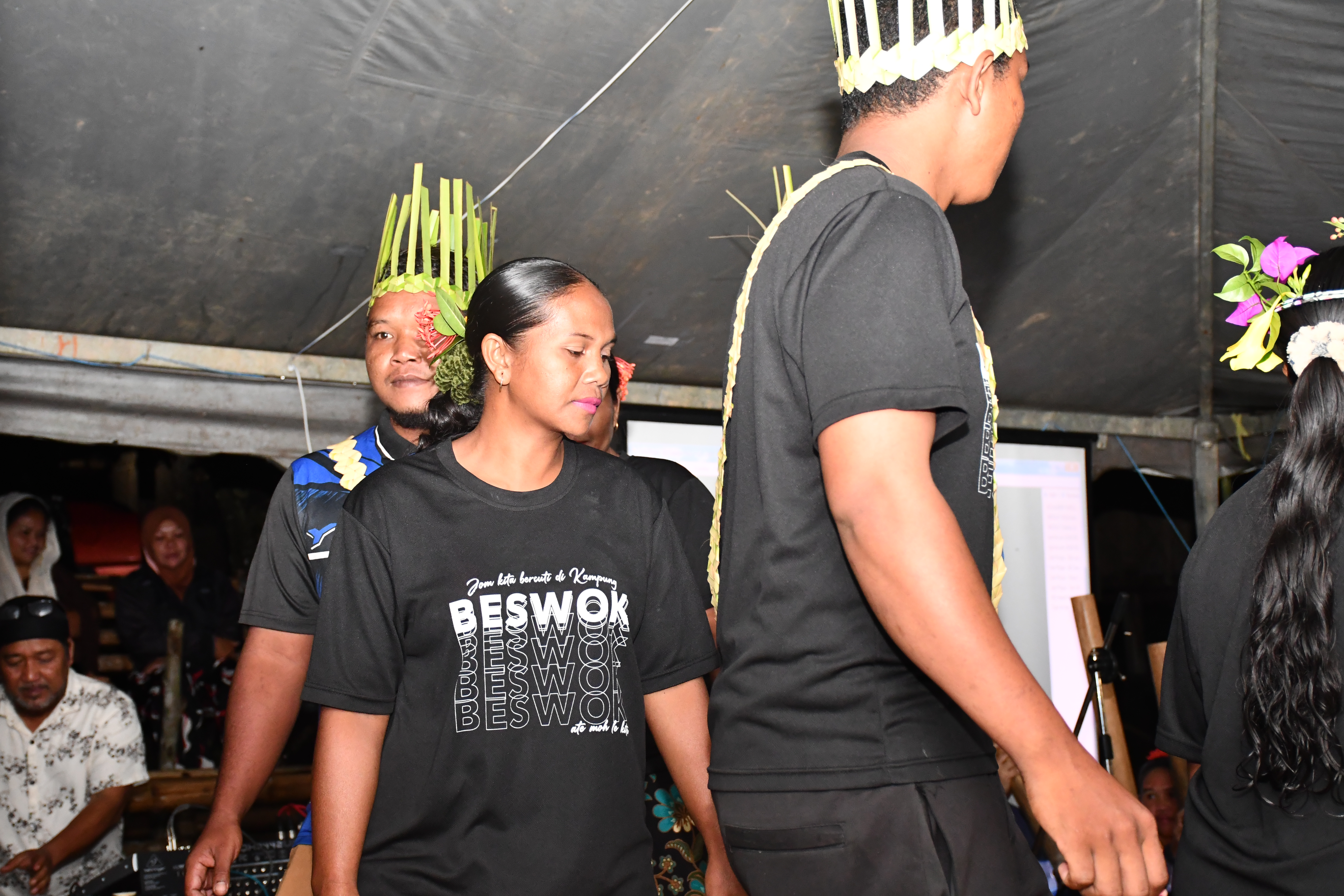
Members of the Temiar tribe in Beswok Village, Sungai Siput Perak, performing the "Sewang Dance"

Sewang is a traditional dance performed by the aboriginal Orang Asli people of Malaysia. Originally the dance was performed for funeral, for thanksgiving, or to treat the sick or wounded, and now it is also used to entertain foreign travelers. It involves dancing in a circle to music produced from bamboo.
