= Semai language =

Austroasiatic language spoken in Malaysia

Semai
- engrok Semai
- Native to: Peninsular Malaysia
- Ethnicity: 60,438 Semai people (2020)
- Native speakers: 60,438 (2020)
- Language family: Austroasiatic: Aslian; Central Aslian; Semai
- Writing system: Latin

Language codes
- ISO 639-3: sea
- Glottolog: sema1266
- ELP: Semai

Semai (engrok Semai) is a Austroasiatic language of western Malaysia spoken by about 60,438 Semai people. It is one of the few Aslian languages which are not endangered, and even has 2,000 monolingual speakers. It is currently spoken by 3 main groups; the Northern Semai, Central Semai and the Southern Semai.

== Phonology ==
One notable aspect of Semai phonology is its highly irregular pattern of expressive reduplication, showing discontiguous copying from just the edges of the reduplicant's base, thus forming a minor syllable.

=== Vowels ===
Oral vowels
	Front	Central	Back
Close	i iː	ɨ ɨː	u uː
Close-mid	e eː		o oː
Open-mid	ɛ ɛː	ə	ɔ ɔː
Open		ɑ ɑː	

Nasal vowels
	Front	Central	Back
Close	ĩ ĩː	ɨ̃ ɨ̃ː	ũ ũː
Mid	ɛ̃ ɛ̃ː	ə̃	ɔ̃ ɔ̃ː
Open		ɑ̃ ɑ̃ː	

=== Consonants ===
		Bilabial	Alveolar	Palatal	Velar	Glottal
Plosive	voiceless	p	t	c	k	ʔ
Plosive	voiced	b	d	ɟ	ɡ	
Nasal	voiced	m	n	ɲ	ŋ	
Nasal	preploded	ᵇm	ᵈn	^{ɟ}ɲ	ᶢŋ	
Fricative			s			h
Rhotic			ɾ~r			
Lateral			l			
Approximant		w		j		

== Examples ==
Examples of words in Semai include the following:

English	Semai	Malay
I	Eng	Saya
Eat	Cak	Makan
Drink	Ngaut	Minum
Bathe	Mehmu	Mandi
Clean	Parlain	Bersih
Good	Bor	Bagus
Chicken	Bafung/Fung	Ayam
Rice	Cengroy	Beras
Mushroom	Cenai	Cendawan
Why	Jalek	Kenapa
How	Rahalook	Bagaimana

== In popular culture ==
- Asli (2017), a film directed by David Liew, is about a bi-racial girl on a road to discover her cultural heritage, is the first film to use the Semai language in 50% of its dialogue.
