= Temiar language =

Austroasiatic language spoken in Malaysia

Temiar
- Native to: Peninsular Malaysia
- Native speakers: 30,000 (2020)
- Language family: Austroasiatic: Aslian; Central Aslian; Temiar
- Writing system: Latin

Language codes
- ISO 639-3: tea
- Glottolog: temi1246
- ELP: Temiar

Temiar is a Central Aslian (Austroasiatic) language spoken in Western Malaysia by the Temiar people. The Temiar are one of the most numerous Aslian-speaking peoples, numbering around 30,000 in 2017.

== Name ==
Etymologically, the word "Temiar" means "edge" or "side". This meaning reflects the way in which Temiars describe themselves as "people of the edge, outside, [i.e. jungle]."

== Phonology ==
=== Vowels ===
Oral vowels
	Front	Central	Back
Close	i iː	ʉ ʉː	u uː
Close-mid	e eː		o oː
Open-mid	ɛ ɛː	ə əː	ɔ ɔː
Open		a aː	

Nasal vowels
	Front	Central	Back
Close	ĩ ĩː	ʉ̃ ʉ̃ː	ũ ũː
Mid	ɛ̃ ɛ̃ː		ɔ̃ ɔ̃ː
Open		ã ãː	

=== Consonants ===
		Bilabial	Dental	Palatal	Velar	Glottal
Plosive	voiceless	p	t	c	k	ʔ
Plosive	voiced	b	d	ɟ	ɡ	
Nasal		m	n	ɲ	ŋ	
Rhotic			ɾ			
Lateral			l			
Fricative				ɕ		h
Approximant		w		j		

== Morphosyntax ==
=== Noun Phrase ===
The noun phrase is (pro)noun initial followed by modifiers and demonstratives or possessor pronouns. Pronouns may not be modified by another pronoun. There are three allomorphic classes of pronouns (stressed unstressed, and bound). Stressed third person pronouns must occur with a demonstrative (and hence only occur as unstressed or as bound morphemes on the demonstrative (e.g. na-doh 'he-here' or ʔun-tu:y 'they-elsewhere.'

Stressed Pronouns
Person	Singular	Dual		Plural	
		Inclusive	Exclusive	Inclusive	Exclusive
1	ye:ʔ	ʔa:r	ya:r	ʔɛ:ʔ	kanɛ:ʔ
2	ha:ʔ	kəʔan		ɲɔb	

Unstressed Pronouns
Person	Singular	Dual		Plural	
		Inclusive	Exclusive	Inclusive	Exclusive
1	yeh	ʔah	yah	ʔɛh	kanɛh
2	hah	kəʔan		ɲɔb	
3	ʔəh	weh wɛh		ʔun ʔən	

Bound Pronouns
Person	Singular	Dual		Plural	
		Inclusive	Exclusive	Inclusive	Exclusive
1	ʔi-	ʔa-	ya-	ʔɛ-	kanɛ- ki- kɛ-
2	ha-	kəʔa-		ɲɔ(b)-	
3	na- ʔə-	we- wɛ-		ʔun-	

=== Verb Phrase ===
The verb phrase is ordered as sentential negation, auxiliary verb and main verb. The verb phrase precedes the subject.
