= Jedek language =

Aslian language spoken in Malaysia

Jedek
- Native to: Malay Peninsula
- Ethnicity: Menriq; Batek
- Native speakers: 280 (2017)
- Language family: Austroasiatic: Aslian; Jahaic; Eastern; Jedek

Language codes
- ISO 639-3: None (mis)
- Glottolog: jede1239

Jedek is an Aslian language from the Austroasiatic family first reported in 2017. Jedek speakers describe themselves as ethnic Menriq or Batek to outsiders, but their language, although very closely related, is distinct from these languages.

== Etymology ==
Jedek speakers have no autonym (endonym). Nearby Aslian speakers, particular the Jahai and Menriq, refer to them as the Jdɛk [ɟᶽəˈdɛk˺].

== Sociolinguistics ==
Jedek is spoken by about 280 people in Sungai Rual, located on the Rual River just south of the town of Jeli in Jeli District, Kelantan state, northern Peninsular Malaysia. In the 1970s, the Malaysian government sponsored the resettlement of several bands of Semang foragers, both Jahai and Jedek speakers who roamed the middle reaches of the Pergau River, to the Sungai Rual area. Today, the area comprises three hamlets and is inhabited by seven bands, of which four are primarily Jedek-speaking, and three are primarily Jahai-speaking.

The low number of Jedek speakers could lead it to being considered endangered, but several factors are ensuring that intergenerational transmission of the language is not interrupted. The Semang have a strong tradition of maintaining their unique cultural and linguistic identity while undergoing constant contact and social change. The speaker population of Jedek has grown since the 1970s, and Jedek is used in all environments by speakers of all age groups. Meanwhile, all schooling is in the national language Malay, and getting a paid job invariably means knowing Malay, the main language of communication in the areas surrounding Aslian speech communities. Although Jedek speakers have a positive attitude towards their language, the language is unrecognized by the Malaysian government, which regards the settlement area as Jahai-speaking.

Traditionally, Semang communities are highly nomadic and accustomed to the breakup of groups to suit the particular conditions they were experiencing. The Semang also practice band exogamy, meaning that marriage between speakers of different languages is quite common. Due to frequent contact with surrounding communities, Semang are typically fluent in multiple Aslian languages, and in most cases an adjacent majority language (Malay or Thai). Due to the settlement of Jedek- and Jahai-speaking bands together at Rual, most Jedek speakers have some knowledge of Jahai.

== Phonology ==
=== Vowels ===
Jedek has 9 vowels. All vowels have nasal equivalents, and Jedek demonstrates contrastive nasalization.

	Front	Central	Back
Close	i	ɨ	u
Close-mid	e	ə	o
Open-mid	ɛ	ə	ɔ
Open	a		

=== Consonants ===
Jedek demonstrates a typical Jahaic consonant inventory.

		Bilabial	Alveolar	Palatal	Velar	Glottal
Nasal		m	n	ɲ	ŋ	
Plosive	voiceless	p	t	c	k	ʔ
Plosive	voiced	b	d	ɟ	ɡ	ʔ
Fricative		(ɸ)		ç		h
Approximant			l	j	w	
Trill			r			

The voiceless bilabial fricative /ɸ/ is a marginal consonant that occurs only in word-final position

Nasals are prestopped in word-final position when preceded by an oral vowel. Nasal consonants also cause progressive nasalization of vowels.

The rhotic consonant varies in pronunciation from the alveolar trill /r/ to the voiced uvular fricative /ʁ/. How the speaker pronounces it is dependent partially on the speaker's age: younger speakers are more likely to pronounce it closer to /r/ while older speakers are more likely to have a pronunciation closer to /ʁ/.
