= Jahai =

Jahai may refer to:

- Jahai people, an indigenous Orang Asli people in Malaysia
- Jahai language, a part of the Jahaic languages spoken in Malaysia
- Jahaic languages, a group of northern Aslian language spoken in the Malay Peninsula region
