= TNZ =

TNZ can refer to:

- tinidazole, an anti-parasitic drug
- the thermal neutral zone, the temperature range that a warm-blooded organism can tolerate
- an informal abbreviation for Tanzania
- the Ten'edn language spoken in Thailand and Malaysia
- Ti–13Nb–13Zr, a metal that is an alloy of titanium, niobium, and zirconium
- Transit New Zealand, a former New Zealand government agency
- Team New Zealand, in some sports events
  - Team New Zealand of yachting
