= Lowland Semang language =

Lowland Semang may refer to:

- Any of several languages of Malaysia also known as Wila' or Bila'
- A spurious language of Indonesia listed in Ethnologue 14
