= Olfactory language =

Language associated with the sense of smell

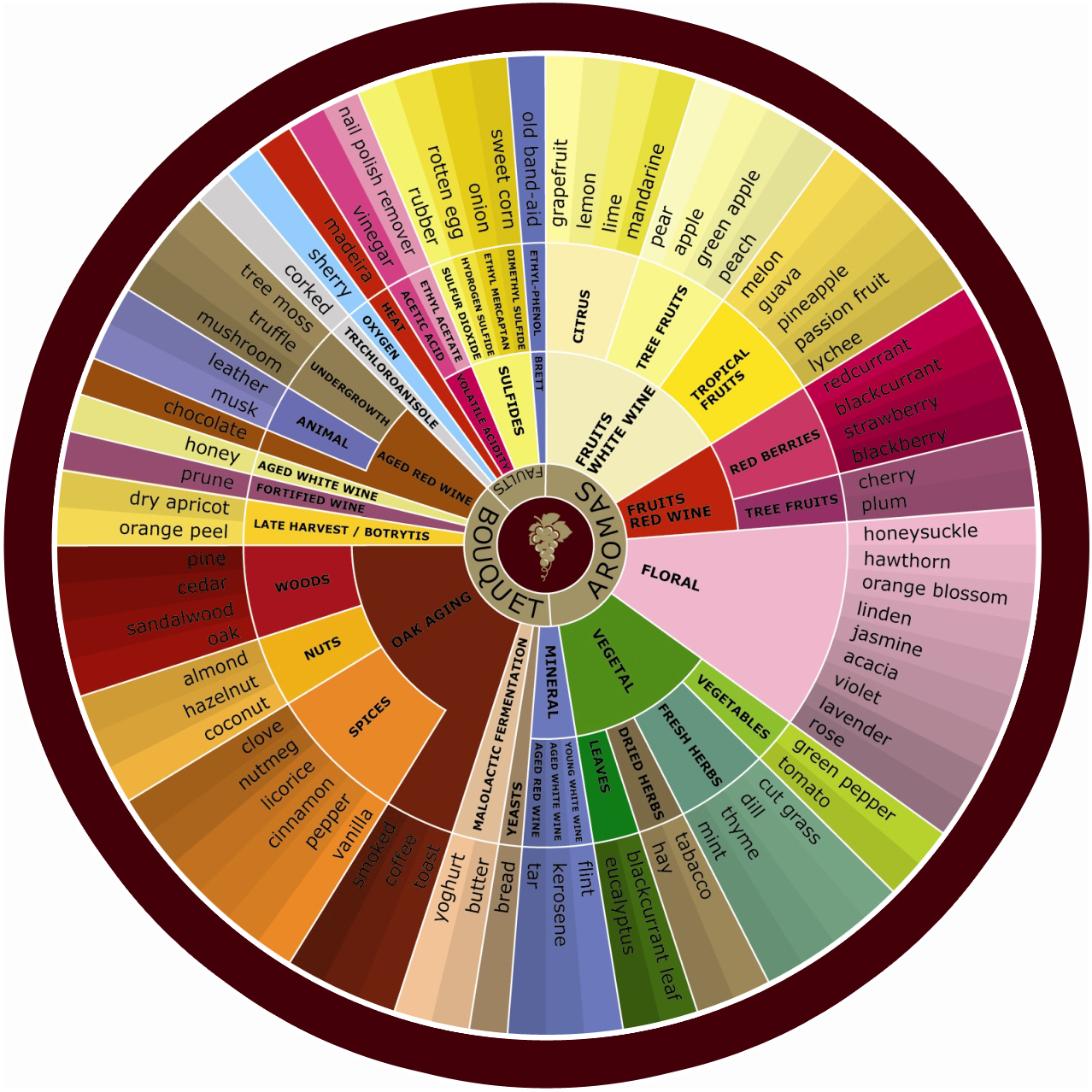
English wine aroma terms grouped into categories and subcategories.

Olfactory language refers to language associated with the sense of smell. It involves the naming and categorisation of odours by humans according to each odour's perceived source or attributes. The study of olfactory language is part of the field of linguistics and is distinct from the study of semiochemical communication, which involves communication between organisms using chemical substances detected through olfaction.

== Cross-linguistic variation ==
=== Olfactory perception and identification ===
Different speech communities tend to display differences in both the perception and linguistic categorisation of odours. In general, Europeans find it harder to identify odours than hunter-gatherer communities. The ease with which odours are identified by speakers is related to the primary type of olfactory vocabulary used in their speech community. Some speech communities, including Jahai- and Thai-speaking hunter-gatherers, mostly use dedicated abstract vocabulary for referring to odour qualities, while others, such as Dutch and English speakers, mostly use concrete terms that identify the source itself. When presented with common odours and asked to name them, Jahai speakers are likely to use the same abstract descriptor and answer more quickly, while English and Dutch speakers tend to take longer to answer and use a more diverse range of mostly concrete descriptors, suggesting that abstract and concrete odour names are encoded differently. The nature of odour-colour associations also differs between speech communities based on their vocabulary. Dutch speakers who use concrete terms associate a particular odour with the colour of its source (e.g., banana odour associated with the colour yellow), while Maniq and Thai speakers who use abstract terminology do not show consistent odour-colour associations.

=== Olfactory metaphor ===
Cross-linguistically, olfactory metaphor is traditionally thought to be the least important of all the senses, especially when compared to visual or auditory metaphors, although emerging research suggests the phenomenon is more common than previously thought. In English, olfactory metaphors with negative connotations are often used to describe bad character ("he's a stinker") or the detection of bad qualities ("I smell something fishy about this deal"). In the Seri language, olfactory metaphor and metonymy are salient features. One example is the expression hiisax cheemt iha ("I am angry"), literally 'my.spirit stinks (Declarative)'.

== Variation within languages ==
Different populations speaking the same language and sharing cultural traditions may still display varied perceptions of an odour, based on its prevalence and most common source in each location. For example, one study showed that French speakers in Quebec find the scent of wintergreen more pleasant and edible than speakers in France. This is because the odour is commonly used in candies and sodas in North America, while in Europe it is used mainly in medicinal products. However, providing concrete names for the source of the odours caused cultural differences in responses to decrease or disappear, suggesting that providing more linguistic information about an odour tends to make its perception more salient in the mind of the smeller.

== Clinical applications ==
In a clinical setting, patients may undergo olfactory tests to aid in the diagnosis of mental disorders. A common test involves the use of "Sniffin' Sticks", a set of marker pens imbued with different scents at varying dilutions. Sniffin' Sticks are used both for diagnosis and for research into olfaction, including olfactory language. Due to linguistic variation across speech communities, the Sniffin' Sticks test must be validated for each country in which medical professionals wish to use it for diagnosis. Rather than using a literal translation of scent descriptors, researchers validating the test in a new country may need to change the translated descriptors to more culturally-appropriate terms for the speech community in question. For example, researchers validating the Sniffin' Sticks test for the Portuguese population changed the original translation of the grapefruit scent descriptor, toranja, to the Portuguese word for orange, laranja. This is because grapefruits are not commonly eaten in Portugal, which resulted in participant familiarity falling below the benchmark of 75%. Altering lesser known descriptors such as "grapefruit" to less literal but more culturally-relevant translations increased familiarity to within the range expected for healthy populations. This validated the Sniffin' Sticks test for the Portuguese population without requiring the scents themselves to be altered.

== See also ==
- Olfactory memory
- Sociolinguistics
