= XBN =

XBN or xbn may refer to:

- Kenaboi language (ISO 639-3: xbn), an extinct unclassified language of Negeri Sembilan, Malaysia
- Xinbin Manchu Autonomous County (Division code: XBN), one of the three counties under the administration of Fushun, Liaoning Province, China
