= Mani language =

Mani may refer to:

- Bullom So language
- A dialect of Mpade
- A dialect of Indus Kohistani

== See also ==
- Mani' language (disambiguation)
