= Max Crawford Medal =

Australian academic award for outstanding achievement in the humanities

The Max Crawford Medal is awarded every other year by the Australian Academy of the Humanities in recognition of "outstanding achievement in the humanities by young Australian scholars currently engaged in research, and whose publications contribute towards an understanding of their discipline by the general public". It is funded from a bequest to the academy by Emeritus Professor R.M. Crawford. In 2019 it became an annual award.

== Recipients ==
- 2025: Thao Phan (Australian National University)
- 2024: Olga Boichak ( University of Sydney )
- 2023: T. J. Thomson
- 2022: Laura Smith-Khan (University of Technology Sydney)
- 2021: André Brett (University of Wollongong)
- 2020: Billy Griffiths (Deakin University)
- 2019: Ronika Power (Macquarie University)
- 2018: Raihan Ismail (Australian National University) and Dr Ana Tanașoca (University of Canberra)
- 2016: David McInnis (University of Melbourne) and Dr Louise Richardson-Self (University of Tasmania)
- 2014: Tom Murray (Macquarie University)
- 2012: Michael Ondaatje (University of Newcastle) and Dr Lisa Ford (University of New South Wales)
- 2010: Roland Burke (La Trobe University)
- 2008: Kate Crawford (University of New South Wales)
- 2006: Christopher Hilliard (University of Sydney)
- 2004: Kirsten McKenzie (University of Sydney)
- 2002: Glenda Sluga (University of Sydney)
- 2000: John Hajek (University of Melbourne)
- 1997: Tom Griffiths (Australian National University)
- 1996: Lesley Stirling (University of Melbourne)
- 1995: Nicholas Thomas (Australian National University)
- 1994: Geremie Barmé (Australian National University)
- 1993: Hilary Fraser (University of Western Australia)
- 1992: Janet McCalman (University of Melbourne)
