= Proto-Aslian language =

Reconstructed ancestor of the Aslian languages

Proto-Aslian
- Reconstruction of: Aslian languages
- Reconstructed ancestor: Proto-Austroasiatic

Proto-Aslian is the reconstructed proto-language of the Aslian languages of Peninsular Malaysia and southern Thailand. It has been reconstructed by Timothy Phillips (2012).

== Reconstructed forms ==
The 289 reconstructed Proto-Aslian forms below are from Phillips (2012:259-262).

- *[bə]teew 'water, river'
- *[ca(n)]bɨŋ 'spider'
- *[d/g]arɯɯɲ 'termite'
- *[gə]liik 'to swallow'
- *[gə]rɛɛs 'liver'
- *[ɟa]lɯɯʔ 'pig'
- *[kə]soom 'nest'
- *[lə]bit 'to close (eyes)'
- *[m/n]uay 'one'
- *[pə]tam 'to plant'
- *[s/h]uəc 'to whistle'
- *[s]paay 'new'
- *[sa]tam 'right (side)'
- *[tam]pɯɯs 'to sweep'
- *[ʔa]tiɛʔ 'earth'
- *[ʔən]cɛɛn 'cooked'
- *{(–)l–} '(iterative)'
- *{(-)m-} '(nominalizer agentive)'
- *{(-)n-} '(nominalizer)'
- *{pər-} '(causative)'
- *{–ra–} '(plural/comparative)'
- *baay 'to dig'
- *bakaʔ 'descendant'
- *baliiŋ 'sky'
- *baʔ 'to carry on back'
- *bəhɔ(ɔ)l 'deer'
- *bəhiiʔ 'sated (of food)'
- *bək 'to tie'
- *bəkaaw 'flower'
- *bəkah 'to break'
- *bəlaaw 'blowgun'
- *bəliiŋ 'arm'
- *bəlooʔ 'thigh'
- *bənɨ(ɨ)m 'mountain'
- *bərɔl 'dart butt'
- *bəriʔ 'forest'
- *bətees 'mushroom'
- *bəy[oo]k 'white'
- *bəʔaak 'flood'
- *bəʔet 'good'
- *bɨt 'hot'
- *bɯɯl 'drunk'
- *bɯɯʔ 'to suck'
- *boh 'to put/place'
- *bus 'cane'
- *buyaaʔ 'alligator'
- *ca(a)l 'to say'
- *caaʔ 'to eat'
- *cah 'cah'
- *cap 'to catch'
- *cɔk 'to stab'
- *cɛ(ɛ)s 'to tear'
- *cɛ(ɛ)ʔ 'louse'
- *cə(n)ruas 'fingernail'
- *cədaaw 'rainbow'
- *cədək 'to hiccup'
- *cɛɛm 'bird'
- *cɛɛn 'to cook'
- *cəgɛh 'hard'
- *cəkʔiɛk 'gecko'
- *cəloon 'back'
- *cəma(a)ʔ 'sharp'
- *cəntɯɯgŋ 'drum'
- *cəŋcɛ̃ɛ̃ŋ 'eyebrow'
- *cərəs 'rib'
- *cəruuʔ 'winnow basket'
- *ciip 'to walk'
- *cɨl 'tattoo'
- *coom 'to burn'
- *cuam 'to dig'
- *cuəh 'to defecate'
- *cuəʔ 'dog'
- *daŋ 'to see'
- *dɔŋ 't.o. monkey'
- *deh 'they (3P)'
- *dəka(a)n 'bamboo rat'
- *dəlũũʔ 'to push'
- *dɯɯŋ 'house'
- *duuy 'afternoon'
- *gaal 'waist'
- *gaɲ 'to bite'
- *gɔl 'to carry on back'
- *gəcɛɛʔ 'moon'
- *gəhɛɛt 'sweet'
- *gəlisɛɛh 'to whisper'
- *gəluk 'to laugh'
- *gəriɛŋ 'monitor lizard'
- *gətɔh 'to spit'
- *gɨn 'they (3P)'
- *gɯɯm 'to winnow'
- *gulam 'to carry on shoulder'
- *guul 'mortar'
- *hã(ã)n 'where'
- *haar 'we two (1D.IN)'
- *halap 'to raft'
- *hawa(a)r 'mucus'
- *heeʔ 'you (2S)'
- *hə̃m 'to breathe'
- *hiiʔ 'we (1P.IN)'
- *hiŋkaaʔ 'to play'
- *ɟaam / *ʔiɟaam 'to cry'
- *ɟak 'to step on'
- *ɟaŋka(a)ʔ 'chin/jaw'
- *ɟarlaaʔ 'thorn'
- *ɟɔ̃ɔ̃t 'to suck'
- *ɟeeʔ 'we (1P.EX)'
- *ɟəhuuʔ 'tree'
- *ɟəl 'to bark'
- *ɟəʔaaŋ 'bone'
- *ɟɨk 'to breathe'
- *ɟɯɯk 'to move'
- *ɟuŋ 'foot/leg'
- *k[a]niɛʔ 'mouse'
- *k[a]ʔiɛp 'centipede'
- *kaac 'to scratch'
- *kaaʔ 'fish'
- *kamiɛk 'to carry under arm'
- *kaɲɔŋ 'elbow'
- *kanɛ(ɛ)t 'small'
- *kap 'to bite'
- *karɛɛy 'thunder'
- *karəŋ 'tree trunk'
- *kawããp 'bear'
- *kayoot 'pregnant'
- *kɔɔɲ 'male'
- *ke 'he/she (3S)'
- *ke(e)ŋ 'to pull'
- *kə(n)siir 'husband'
- *kəbəc 'to fish'
- *kəbɛɛc 'to spit'
- *kəbɨɨʔ 'fruit'
- *kəbɨs 'to die'
- *kəboʔ 'mosquito'
- *kədɛk 'bitter'
- *kɛɛʔ 'to seek'
- *kəhuəy 'to gape'
- *kəl 'to fall'
- *kəlaaŋ 'eagle'
- *kəlapuəh 'shoulder'
- *kəlɨɨt 'firefly'
- *kəluəŋ 'inside'
- *kəm 'to obtain'
- *kəmbaar 'twin'
- *kəmeet 'mosquito'
- *kəmooc 'ghost'
- *kəmuar 'worm, caterpillar'
- *kəmuən 'nephew'
- *kəɲaaŋ 'quick'
- *kəndah 'wife'
- *kəpiil 'turtle'
- *kərɔʔ 'back'
- *kərɟɛr 'to dance'
- *kəroom 'under'
- *kərual 'knee'
- *kəteŋ 'calf (leg)'
- *kətɯɯʔ 'skin, bark'
- *kəyɔŋ 'to hear'
- *kiɛt 'anus'
- *kipaaŋ 'top'
- *kɯɯʔ 'to vomit'
- *kooɲ 'male'
- *krkbaak 'butterfly'
- *kuəm 'to hold, grasp'
- *kuən 'child'
- *kuuy 'head'
- *lakuəm 'brain'
- *las 'ant'
- *lɛc 'wrong/miss'
- *ləda(a)ʔ 'armpit'
- *leew 'bamboo'
- *ləhiɛŋ 'saliva'
- *lək 'quiver'
- *ləmooɲ 'tooth'
- *ləɲsiɲ 'gums'
- *ləntaak 'tongue'
- *ləŋɛ(ɛ)ʔ 'neck'
- *ləsəm 'rain'
- *ləwɛɛy 'bee'
- *liɛp 'to plait (leaves)'
- *m(??)h 'you (2S)'
- *mahaam 'blood'
- *man 'to play'
- *mat 'eye'
- *mɔɔh 'nose'
- *məriɛm 'how many?'
- *miɛŋ 'cheek'
- *mro(o)ɲ 'louse'
- *muuh 'to bathe'
- *napak 'boar'
- *nɔɔm 'to urinate'
- *nɛŋ 'before'
- *niis 'mat'
- *nooŋ 'road'
- *ɲooʔ 'to suck'
- *padaw 'bee'
- *pak 'to chop'
- *paraaʔ 'shelf'
- *pareeʔ 'monitor lizard'
- *pəhɨɨm 'to break wind'
- *pəlɛ(ɛ)ʔ 'astonished'
- *pəleek 'bat'
- *pəlɛɛʔ 'fruit'
- *pələm 'leech'
- *pəluaŋ 'roof'
- *pənlɯɯŋ 'egg'
- *pərəc 'wing'
- *pəʔaas 'turtle'
- *pɨɨt 'to extinguish'
- *pɨt 'to blow'
- *puk 'chicken'
- *rəmpiɛt 'to thresh'
- *rəwaay 'soul'
- *riɛt 'to wring'
- *rudɔŋ 'friend'
- *ruəp 'friend'
- *ruəy 'fly'
- *ruuy 'to sow'
- *rʔiɛs / ʔriɛs 'root'
- *sa(a)r 'to descend'
- *sɔɔk 'hair, feather'
- *sɛ(ɛ)ɲ 'end'
- *sə[n]taaʔ 'tail'
- *sɛc 'flesh'
- *sɛɛh 'to pound'
- *sɛɛl 'shy'
- *səgu(u)ʔ 'to ask, request'
- *səlaay 'field'
- *səlaaʔ 'leaf'
- *səlɨʔdeʔ 'cockroach'
- *səluuh 'to blowpipe'
- *səmaaɲ 'to ask'
- *səmaaʔ 'human being'
- *səŋɛc 'cold'
- *səŋəp 'darkness'
- *siɛc 'to steal'
- *siɛm 'to forget'
- *sisɛʔ 'to dance'
- *siyãʔ 'house'
- *sɯɯc 'to sting'
- *suək 'navel'
- *suəm 'marrow'
- *suuc 'to wash'
- *suup 'lung'
- *taaɲ 'to plait, weave'
- *tabooʔ 'thumb'
- *taɟaak 'to carry in hand'
- *taɟuuʔ 'snake'
- *talun 'python'
- *tawɔɔh 't.o. gibbon'
- *tawiiŋ 'spider'
- *tɔɔt 'to burn'
- *təbiŋ 'full'
- *təhop 'turtle'
- *təhuəl 'to blow'
- *təkɔɔʔ 'pus'
- *təmɔʔ 'stone'
- *təmkal 'male'
- *təniit 'lip'
- *təŋ(k)əm 'molar'
- *tiɛk 'to sleep'
- *tiɛl 'footprint'
- *tiil 'to dry'
- *tool 'to carry on head'
- *tuəs 'to pull out'
- *wɔɔk 'to wake up'
- *we(e)n 'to throw out'
- *weeh 'they two (3D)'
- *weel 'again'
- *wɛ̃ɛ̃n 'to squeeze'
- *wiɛl 'left (side)'
- *yɛɛʔ 'I (1S)'
- *ʔaap 'tiger'
- *ʔaat 'stick/spear'
- *ʔas 'to swell'
- *ʔawak 'ladle'
- *ʔɔ̃ɔ̃ɲ 'to smell'
- *ʔɔɔs 'fire'
- *ʔə[k]ʔaak 'crow'
- *ʔɛc 'belly, excrement'
- *ʔəmpuaʔ 'to dream'
- *ʔəndɯɯm 'ripe'
- *ʔəɲiiʔ 'before'
- *ʔəntaŋ 'ear'
- *ʔəntap 'testicle'
- *ʔiiɲ 'I (1S)'
- *ʔoo[k/ŋ] 'wasp'
- *ʔoor 'to command'
- *ʔuək 'to give'
- *ʔuuy 'to do'

== Lexical innovations ==
Selected Aslian lexical innovations as identified by Paul Sidwell (2021):

Gloss	Proto-Aslian	Kensiu	Jahai	Semnam	Semelai
‘bitter’	*kədɛk	kadek	kadɛk	kdɛk	kədɛc
‘marrow’	*suəm	–	suwəp	lasuoːm	smsɔm
‘bear’	*kawãːp	kawap	kawip	kaweːp	–
‘sweet’	*gəhɛːt	gəhɛt	bhɛt	bhɛt	gɛhɛt (Temoq)

== Phonological correspondences ==
Proto-Aslian appears to have some phonological rime correspondences with Nancowry, suggesting that there could be a Southern Austroasiatic branch or linkage that includes Aslian and Nicobaric. Gérard Diffloth (2008) presents the following comparisons (as quoted in Sidwell 2021).

Gloss	Proto-Aslian	Nancowry
‘house-fly’	*ruəj	juəj
‘wasp’	*gr-tuəʔ	tũəʔ
‘child’	*kuən	kuən
‘to scratch’	*kuɔc	koac
‘dream’	*-mpuɔʔ	ʔinfoaʔ
‘fingernail’	*c-(n)r-uɔs	kisoah
‘four’	*puɔn	foan

== See also ==
- Proto-Austroasiatic language
