= Maniq language =

Maniq language may refer to two languages spoken by the Maniq people (Mani'):

- Ten'edn
- Kensiu language
