= Kenaboi language =

Extinct language of Malaysia

Kĕnaboi
- Native to: Malaysia
- Region: Negeri Sembilan
- Extinct: after 1890
- Language family: unclassified (Language isolate?) (Austroasiatic?)
- Dialects: dialect 1; dialect 2

Language codes
- ISO 639-3: xbn
- Glottolog: kena1236
- Linguasphere: 31-MFF-af

Kĕnaboi is an extinct unclassified language of Negeri Sembilan, Malaysia that may be a language isolate or an Austroasiatic language belonging to the Aslian branch. It is attested in what appears to be two dialects, based on word lists of about 250 lexical items, presumably collected around 1870–90.

== Background ==
In Walter William Skeat and Charles Otto Blagden's 1906 work "Pagan Races of the Malay Peninsula", the contents of three previously unpublished wordlists appear, two of which were collected by D.F.A. Hervey, a former government official in Malacca. There is no indication as to when these word lists were collected; however, there is a possibility that these wordlists were collected around the 1870s to 1890s.

Hervey collected his Kenaboi lexicon in Alor Gajah, Malacca from speakers living in Gunung Datoʼ, which is a mountain situated in Rembau District, southern Negeri Sembilan. Based on the ethnonym, the Kenaboi may have originated from the Kenaboi River valley of Jelebu District, northern Negeri Sembilan (Hajek 1998). Today, the Orang Asli of Negeri Sembilan are primarily Temuan speakers.

== Classification ==
John Hajek (1998) proposes that Kenaboi is a mixed language of both Aslian and Austronesian origins, with Kenaboi (dialect 1) having a higher proportion of Austroasiatic words than Kenaboi (dialect 2). Kenaboi (dialect 1) also has many words of unknown origin, such as mambu 'white' and par 'water'. Hajek (1998) speculates that the lexical aberrancy of Kenaboi 1 may be due to the fact that Kenaboi 1 was a special taboo language, while Kenaboi 2 was the regular non-taboo language. The lexicon of Kenaboi 1 is 47% Austroasiatic, 27% Austronesian, and 26% unclassified out of a total of 216 words.

Hammarström, et al. note in Glottolog that Kenaboi is best considered to be a language isolate, and do not consider arguments of Kenaboi as a taboo-jargon (argot) to be convincing. Skeat and Blagden (1906) considers Kenaboi as an isolate unrelated to Austroasiatic and Austronesian.

Rasa, another extinct language documented in Skeat & Blagden (1906) near Rasa in Ulu Selangor, also has many words of uncertain origin (Phillips 2012: 257-258).

== See also ==
- Kenaboi word list (Wiktionary)
- Andamanese languages
- Philippine Negrito languages
- Proto-Aslian language
- Kusunda language

Other Southeast Asian languages with high proportions of unique vocabulary of possible isolate origin:

- Enggano language (Indonesia)
- Manide language (Philippines)
- Umiray Dumaget language (Philippines)
