= To See and Be Seen =

Book written by T. J. Thomson

- Author: T. J. Thomson
- Language: English
- Genre: Non-fiction
- Publisher: Rowman & Littlefield
- Publication date: 2019

To See and Be Seen: The Environments, Interactions and Identities Behind News Images is a non-fiction book written by T. J. Thomson and published in 2019 by Rowman & Littlefield. It is the winner of the National Communication Association’s 2020 Diane S. Hope Book of the Year award. NCA reviewers called the book “a signature achievement in understanding the process of media production and the ethics of photojournalism.”

The work unpacks the environmental, social, cultural, and psychological aspects that shape news images and explores through ethnographic methods how visual journalists work in the field and how those visually featured in the news react to the depictions made of them.

Writing in the Newspaper Research Journal, Dr. Matthew Haught, assistant chair and associate professor at the University of Memphis, said the book “offers much-needed context to everyday journalism” and characterized the work as sitting between Ken Kobré’s practitioner-focused “Photojournalism: The Professionals’ Approach” and Susan Sontag’s philosophical “On Photography” book. Haught continues:

Thomson’s readers won’t learn how to adjust the ISO, but they will learn about what might be going through the heads of those whose images they are capturing. Readers won’t learn how to control white balance on video, but they will learn about what audiences find credible about the visuals they see in the media. Thomson’s book comes at a time when those who teach journalism need to focus deeply on ethics and regaining public confidence, to be both sources and consumers, as they do on the technical proficiencies of the field.

The book was also reviewed in the International Journal of Press/Politics by Katharina Lobinger, vice-dean for the Faculty of Communication, Culture and Society at the Università della Svizzera Italiana. Lobinger noted that Thomson's book addressed a "serious research gap" and said his focus on both photographers and on those photographed was "unique" and "very timely in its focus."

A major theme in the book is how the production of news visuals can impact overall trust in media. The American Press Institute interviewed Thomson about this in 2020 in order to better understand how journalists and news organizations can build trust through more context and transparency around images and better journalist-subjects interactions. Thomson noted that issues of consent, permission, and privacy are often intertwined with people’s reactions to news visuals and offered several recommendations for journalists on how to improve their interactions with those they cover.

Thomson was also interviewed in 2020 by the American Society of Media Photographers about his inspiration for the book. In the interview, he stated, “Two-dimensional representations can be the thinnest slices of reality and what they represent is almost always only a fraction of the overall scene. So often we use these little two dimensional slices of reality to understand the world but fail to understand the broader context in which they were produced. My research seeks to change this and to consider how visual journalism is produced – by whom, in what environments, through which processes, and with what results.”
