= T.J. Thomson =

T. J. Thomson is an associate professor of visual communication at RMIT University in Melbourne, Australia, where he co-leads the News, Technology, and Society Network. Previously, he was a lecturer and senior lecturer in the School of Communication at the Queensland University of Technology in Brisbane, Australia, from 2018-2023, and a chief investigator at its Digital Media Research Centre, where he founded and led its News, Media, and Journalism Research Group.

He teaches and researches on visual communication topics, especially media representation, the production and reception of visual journalism, and visual culture. He has been an officer in several national and international societies and served as the associate editor of Visual Communication Quarterly from 2017-2025.

Thomson has critiqued the field of visual studies as being inundated with framing approaches and has both spearheaded and led the call for additional research and approaches that examine production influences on visual content that extend beyond such considerations. His work explores the human side of media production, such as the emotional toll of documenting trauma, as well as how freelancers learn and develop with lessened or absent institutional support.

In 2019, the Australian and New Zealand Communication Association and Journalism Education and Research Association of Australia jointly announced that Thomson was the recipient of the Anne Dunn Scholar of the Year Award, an international honour that recognises excellence in the fields of journalism and communication. His 2019 book, To See and Be Seen: The Environments, Interactions and Identities Behind News Images, won the National Communication Association's 2020 Diane S Hope Book of the Year award. NCA reviewers called the book 'a signature achievement in understanding the process of media production and the ethics of photojournalism'. In 2022, he won both the National Communication Association's Communication and Ageing Outstanding Journal Article Award and the James Edwards Article of the Year Award.

He has also received international recognition for his teaching, including by winning the 2021 Visual Communication Teacher of the Year Award from the US-based Association for Education in Journalism and Mass Communication and the 2022 Linda Shockley Award for Excellence in Teaching.

In 2022, the Australian Research Council awarded him a three-year DECRA Fellowship to study local visual news in regional Australia.

Thomson was awarded the 2023 Max Crawford Medal for "his exemplary career in which he helps to build media literacy and addresses misinformation and disinformation".

== Education ==
Thomson obtained a BA in communication from Chadron State College and a graduate certificate, MA, and PhD from the University of Missouri School of Journalism. In 2022, his first alma mater, Chadron State, announced Thomson was the recipient of its Distinguished Young Alumnus Award for "exemplary achievement and success in one's chosen career."

== Professional experience ==
Before entering academia, Thomson worked as a freelance visual journalist and designer for a number of news outlets and organisations, including The Associated Press, The Washington Post, The Huffington Post, and the Omaha World-Herald. Corporate clients included QuickFire Networks, which was acquired by Facebook in 2015; Colorado Academy; and HotelTonight, among others.

== Media appearances and research impact ==
One of Thomson's recent research studies, I "Like" That: Exploring the Characteristics That Promote Social Media Engagement With News Photographs on visual social media reached more than 40.6 million people and appeared in more than 94 news outlets, according to data provided by Cision. The study's findings were highlighted in IANS LIVE, India's largest independent newswire service, Xinhua News Agency, China's biggest and most influential media organisation, The New Indian Express, Science Daily, and Futurity, among others.

He was interviewed in 2018 for a Business Insider article about the societal impact of social media use and was invited to write an article for Crux in 2017 commenting on visual coverage of the Pope's overseas travels.

His visual research has also been included on the reading lists for the University of Liverpool's "Research methods in communication and media" course, Loughborough University's 16SSC357: Producing The News course, The University of Stirling's JOU9JR – Journalism Research & Analysis course, the University of Missouri's J8006: Advanced Qualitative Research Methods, and The University of Pennsylvania's COMM 246: Race and Gender in U.S. Mass Media course.

== Bibliography ==
Thomson, T. J., Miller, E., Holland-Batt, S. Seevinck, J, and Regi, S. (2022). Visibility and invisibility in the aged care sector: Visual representation in Australian news from 2018-2021. Media International Australia.

Thomson, T. J., McLaughlin, J., & King-Smith, L. (2022). Indigenous Knowledges and Perspectives in University Journalism Education: Exploring experiences, challenges, and opportunities. Australian Journalism Review.

Thomson, T. J., & Sternberg, J. (2022). Using Course Management Software and Videoconferencing. In S. Keith & R. Cozma (Eds.), Teaching Journalism Online: The World Journalism Education Council and UNESCO.

Thomson, T. J. (2021). International, innovative, multi-modal, and representative? The geographies, methods, modes, and aims present in two visual communication journals. Visual Communication.

Thomson, T. J. (2021). Reflections on 25 years of Visual Communication Quarterly. Visual Communication Quarterly.

Thomson, T. J., Thomas, G. & Irvine, L. (2021). Conceptualising communication: A survey of introduction to communication university units. Communication Research and Practice.

Thomson, T. J. & Sternberg, J. (2021). Journalism employability in the modern newsroom: Insights from applicant resumes and cover letters. Journalism & Mass Communication Educator.

Dootson, P., Thomson, T. J., & Angus, D. (2021). Managing problematic visual media in natural hazard emergencies. International Journal of Disaster Risk Reduction.

Thomson, T. J. (2021). Picturing Disaster at Home and Abroad: A Comparative Visual Analysis of Icons and News Values During Disaster. Media International Australia.

Thomson, T.J. (2021). Exploring the life cycle of smartphone images from camera rolls to social media platforms. Visual Communication Quarterly.

Thomson, T.J., Angus, D., Dootson, P., Hurcombe, E., & Smith, A. (2020). Visual mis/disinformation in journalism and public communications: Current verification practices, challenges, and future opportunities. Journalism Practice.

Thomson, T.J. (2020). Pride in America's Heartland. Visual Communication Quarterly. 27(1), 40–46.

Thomson, T.J. & Greenwood, K. (2020). Profile Pictures Across Platforms: How Identity Visually Manifests Itself among Social Media Accounts. In Handbook of Visual Communication: Theory, Methods, and Media by Josephson, S., Kelly, J., and Smith, K. (eds). Boca Raton, FL: CRC Press.

Thomson, T.J. (2019). To See and Be Seen: The Environments, Interactions and Identities Behind News Images. London: Rowman & Littlefield.

Thomson, T.J. (2019). In front of the lens: The expectations, experiences, and reactions of visual journalism's subjects. Journalism & Communication Monographs. 21(1), 4-65.

Thomson, T.J. & Greenwood, K. (2019). Framing the Migration: A study of news photographs showing people fleeing war and persecution. International Communication Gazette.

Thomson, T.J. (2019). The evolution of story: How time and modality affect visual and verbal narratives. Visual Communication Quarterly, 25(4).

Thomson, T.J. (2018). Mapping the emotional labor and work of visual journalism. Journalism, 1–18.

Thomson, T.J. (2018). From the Closet to the Beach: A Photographer's View of Gay Life on Fire Island From 1975 to 1983. Visual Communication Quarterly, 25(1), 223–233.

Thomson, T.J., & Greenwood, K. (2017). I "Like" That: Exploring the Characteristics That Promote Social Media Engagement With News Photographs. Visual Communication Quarterly, 24(4), 203–218.

Thomson, T.J., Perreault, G., & Duffy, M. (2017). Politicians, Photographers, and a Pope: How state-controlled and independent media covered Francis's 2015 Cuba visit. Journalism Studies, 1–18.

Thomson, T.J. (2016). Black, white, and a whole lot of gray: How white photojournalists covered race during the 2015 protests at Mizzou. Visual Communication Quarterly, 23(4), 223–233.

Thomson, T.J. (2018). Freelance Photojournalists and Photo Editors: Learning and adapting in a (mostly faceless) virtual world. Journalism Studies, 19(6), 803–823.

Thomson, T.J., & Greenwood, K. (2017). Beyond Framing: Influences of subject–photographer interactions on visual journalism. Journalism Practice, 11(5), 625–644.
