= John Hajek =

John Hajek FAHA
- Occupation: Professor of Italian
- Awards: Max Crawford Medal, 2000

John Hajek FAHA is an Australian linguist and professor at the University of Melbourne.

Hajek has held research fellowships in the United Kingdom and Australia. He is currently director of RUMACCC (Research Unit for Multilingualism and Cross-cultural Communication) and a past president of LCNAU (Languages and Cultures Network for Australian Universities).

Hajek was awarded the Max Crawford Medal in 2000 and was elected a Fellow of the Australian Academy of the Humanities in 2005.

== See also ==
- Kenaboi language
