= Wila' language =

Language of Malaysia

Wila'
- Bila'; Lowland Semang
- Native to: Malaysia
- Region: Seberang Perai
- Era: early 1800s
- Language family: Austroasiatic: Aslian; Jahaic; Western?; Wila'

Language codes
- ISO 639-3: None (mis)
- Linguist List: 0m5
- Glottolog: None

Wila’, also Bila’ and Lowland Semang, is an extinct Aslian languages of Malaya recorded on the Wellesley coast opposite Penang in the early 19th century. They are thought to have been related to the Kintaq.
