= Jahaic languages =

Austroasiatic language group of Southeast Asia

Jahaic
- Jehaic, Northern Aslian
- Geographic distribution: Peninsular Malaysia and Thailand, possibly in the Great Nicobar Island
- Linguistic classification: Austroasiatic: Aslian; Jah Hut–North Aslian; Jahaic
- Subdivisions: Cheq Wong; Northern; Ten'edn; Shompen (possibly)

Language codes
- Glottolog: nort2682
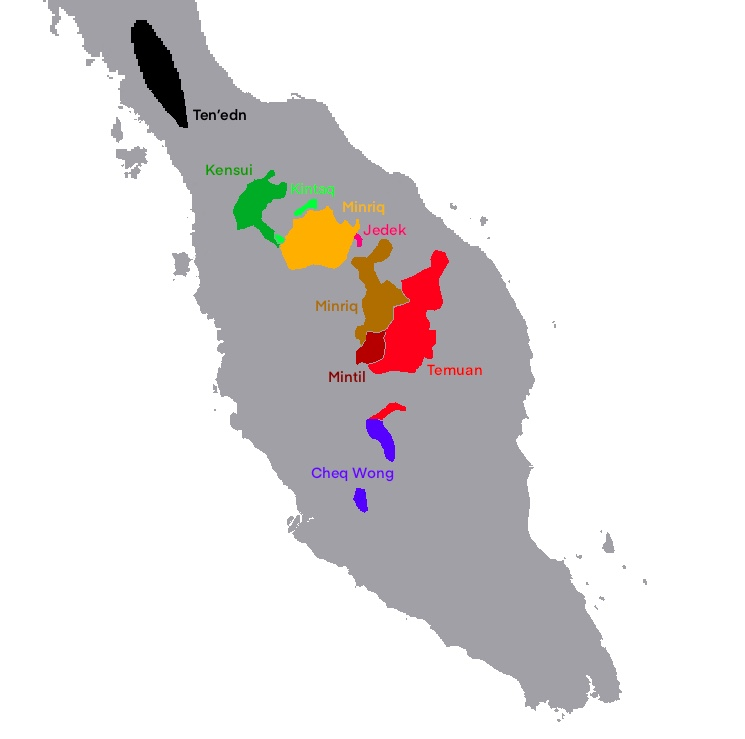

The Jahaic or Northern Aslian languages (also called Jehaic or Semang) are a group of Aslian languages spoken by about 5,000 people in inland areas of Peninsular Malaysia, with a few pockets in southern Thailand. The most distinctive language in the group is the outlier Cheq Wong, which is spoken south of the Central Aslian language Semai. The other languages apart from Ten'edn can be split into two divisions:

- Cheq Wong
- Northern Aslian proper
  - Eastern
    - Batek (Batek Deq and Batek Nong), Mintil (Batek Tanɨm)
    - Jahai (Jehai), Minriq (Menriq)
    - Jedek
  - Western
    - Kintaq
    - Kensiu (Maniq)

(unclassified) Ten'edn (Mos, Maniq)

The name Maniq (Məniʔ, Maniʔ) can refer to either Kensiu or Tonga, both of which also go by the name of Mos.

Some Aslian languages are already extinct, such as Wila' (also called Bila' or Lowland Semang), a language or various languages recorded having been spoken on the Province Wellesley coast opposite Penang in the early 19th century. Another extinct language is Ple-Temer, which was previously spoken near Gerik in northern Perak (Benjamin 2011).
