= Aslian languages =

Subgroup of the Austroasiatic language family

Aslian
- Geographic distribution: Peninsular Malaysia and Southern Thailand
- Linguistic classification: Austroasiatic: Aslian
- Proto-language: Proto-Aslian
- Subdivisions: Jah Hut–North Aslian; Central Aslian; Southern Aslian; ?Kenaboi †

Language codes
- Glottolog: asli1243
- Aslian

The Aslian languages (/ˈæsliən/) are the southernmost branch of Austroasiatic languages spoken on the Malay Peninsula. They are the languages of many of the Orang Asli, the aboriginal inhabitants of the peninsula. The total number of native speakers of Aslian languages is about fifty thousand and all are in danger of extinction. Aslian languages recognized by the Malaysian administration include Kensiu, Kintaq, Jahai, Minriq, Batek, Cheq Wong, Lanoh, Temiar, Semai, Jah Hut, Mah Meri, Semaq Beri, Semelai and Temoq.

== History and origin ==
Aslian languages originally appeared on the western side of the main mountains and eventually spread eastwards into Kelantan, Terengganu and Pahang. The nearest relatives to the Aslian languages are Monic and Nicobarese. There is a possibility the early Monic and Nicobarese people had contact with the migrants who moved into the Malay Peninsula from further north.

Aslian languages contain a complex palimpsest of loanwords from linguistic communities that no longer exist on the Malay Peninsula. Their former residence can be traced from the etymologies and the archaeological evidence for the succession of cultures in the region. Roger Blench (2006) notes that Aslian languages have many Austronesian (specifically Bornean and Chamic) loanwords, pointing to a former presence of Bornean and Chamic speakers on the Malay Peninsula.

Blagden (1906), Evans (1937) and Blench (2006) note that Aslian languages, especially the Northern Aslian (Jahaic) group, contain many words that cannot be traced to any currently known language family. The extinct Kenaboi language of Negeri Sembilan also contains many words of unknown origin in addition to words of Austroasiatic and Austronesian origin.

Sidwell (2023) proposed that Proto-Aslian had arrived in the Malay Peninsula from the Gulf of Thailand region prior to Mon dominance, and was part of an early southern dispersal that also included Nicobaric. Due to its early split from the rest of Austroasiatic, Aslian contains many retentions and has escaped the areal influences that had later swept mainland Southeast Asia. Aslian likely arrived at around the Pahang area and then spread inland and upstream.

== Classification ==
A study with computational phylogenetic lexical analysis conducted by Dunn et al. (2011) devises a classification scheme for the Aslian languages as following:

- Monic-Aslian-Nicobarese
  - Aslian
    - Jah Hut–North Aslian
      - Jah Hut
      - North Aslian
        - Cheq Wong
        - Maniq–Batek: Batek, Jahai, Minriq, Mintil, Kensiu, Kintaq, Ten'edn
    - Central Aslian
      - Semai
      - Temiar–Semnam–Lanoh
    - South Aslian
      - Semaq Beri
      - Semelai–Mah Meri
        - Mah Meri
        - Semelai

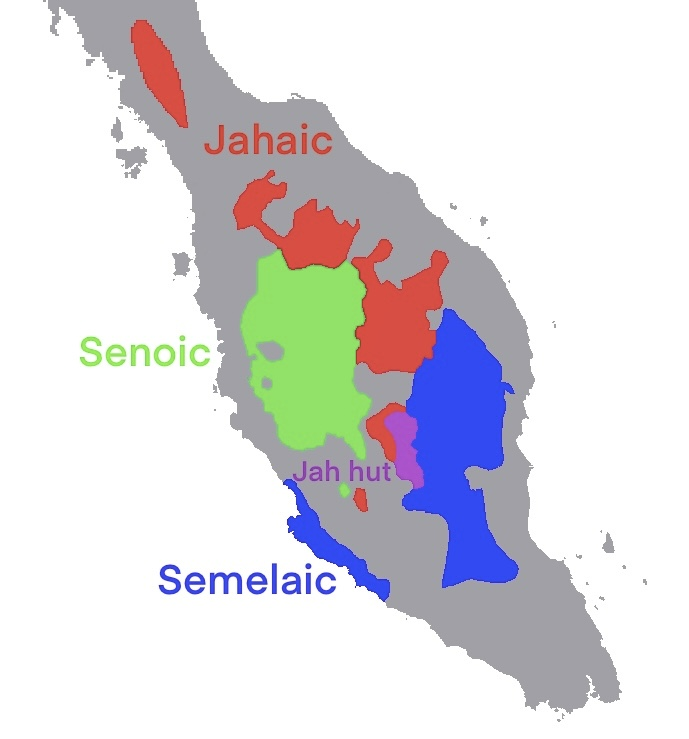
Aslian language classification

The extinct Kenaboi language is unclassified, and may or may not be Aslian.

Phillips (2012:194) lists the following consonant sound changes that each Aslian branch had innovated from Proto-Aslian.

- Northern Aslian: Proto-Aslian *sə- > ha-
- Southern Aslian: loss of Proto-Aslian *-ʔ (final glottal stop)
- Proto-Aslian *-N > *-DN in all branches except Jah Hut

== Reconstruction ==
The Proto-Aslian language has been reconstructed by Timothy Phillips (2012).

== Phonology ==
=== Syllable structure ===
Aslian words may either be monosyllabic, sesquisyllabic or disyllabic:

Monosyllabic: either simple CV(C) or complex CCV(C).

Sesquisyllabic: consist of a major syllable with fully stressed vowel, preceded by a minor syllable

Temiar ləpud 'caudal fin'
Semai kʔɛːp [kɛʔɛːp] 'centipede'

Disyllabic: more morphologically complex, resulting from various reduplications and infixations. Compounds with unreduced though unstressed vowels also occur:

Temiar diŋ-rəb 'shelter'

Loanwords from Malay are a further source of disyllables:

Jah Hut suraʔ 'sing', from Malay; suara 'voice'
Semai tiba:ʔ 'arrive', from Malay; tiba 'arrive'

Temiar even has phonetic trisyllables in morphological categories such as the middle causative (tərakɔ̄w) and the continuative causative (tərɛwkɔ̄w), or in words with proclitics (barhalab ~ behalab 'go downriver').

=== Initial consonants ===
Aslian words generally start with a consonant. Words which start with a vowel will be followed by a glottal stop. In most Aslian languages, aspirated consonants are analyzed as sequences of two phonemes, one of which happens to be h.

Austroasiatic implosives in Aslian were merged with voiced consonants. The fricative /s/ is often realized as voiceless alveolopalatal fricative [ɕ] in many Aslian languages, eg. Semaq Beri /sblɛ̃k/ [ɕə.bə.lɛ̃k], "to be straight". Northern Aslian languages except Cheq Wong feature a voiceless bilabial fricative /ɸ/ in their phonemic inventories. Some varieties also have a voiced alveolar /z/ or a palatal fricative /ʑ/.

Aslian syllable-initial consonant clusters are rich and varied. Stops for example may cluster without restrictions to their place of articulation or voicing:

Jah Hut tkak 'palate', dkaŋ 'bamboo rat', bkul 'gray', bgɔk 'goiter'

Articulation of laryngeal consonants /h, ʔ/ may be superimposed upon the vowel midway in its articulation, giving the impression of two identical vowels interrupted by the laryngeals.

Jah Hut /jʔaŋ/ [jaʔaŋ] 'bone', /ɲhɔːʡ/ [ɲɔˑhɔˑʡ] 'tree'

=== Vowels ===
A typical Aslian vowel system is displayed by Northern Temiar, which has 30 vocalic nuclei.

	Oral		Nasal	
	short	long	short	long
Close	i ʉ u	iː ʉː uː	ĩ ʉ̃ ũ	ĩː ʉ̃ː ũː
Mid	e ə o	eː əː oː	N/A	N/A
Open	ɛ a ɔ	ɛː aː ɔː	ɛ̃ ã ɔ̃	ɛ̃ː ãː ɔ̃ː

The functional load of the nasal/oral contrast is not very high in Aslian languages (not many minimal pairs can be cited). Diffloth states that this phenomenon is unpredictable and irregular in Semai dialects, especially on vowels preceded by h- or ʔ-.

Phonemic vowel length has been retained in Senoic languages such as Semai, Temiar and Sabum. Contrastive length has been lost in the Northern and Southern Aslian branches. The loss of vowel length must have led to complex reorganizations in the vocalic systems of the affected languages, by developing new contrasts elsewhere.

Diphthongization is not as obvious in Aslian languages as compared to the other branches of Mon–Khmer. Proto-Semai is reconstructed with 10-11 long monophthongal vowels, but with only one diphthong, /iə/.

Senoic infixes are sensitive to the number of initial consonants in a root. Rising diphthongs like [i̯ə] or [u̯ə] are ambiguous, since the glide may be interpreted as either a feature of the initial or of the vowel.

=== Final consonants ===
Aslian languages are well endowed with final consonants, with most of the languages placing a lot of stress on them.

- -r, -l, -s, -h and -ʔ are represented and well-preserved in Aslian. There is also a tendency to shorten long vowels before these finals.

It has been reported that Temiar -h has bilabial friction after -u-, e.g. /tuh/ 'speak' pronounced as [tuɸ].

Throughout the Aslian family, final nasals are pre-stopped. In Northern Aslian this has gone further, with final nasals merging with the plosive series.

== Morphology ==
All Aslian languages that have been thoroughly studied have constructive usage of various morphophonemic devices – prefixation, infixation and reduplication. Also, most Aslian languages preserve fossilized traces of other morphological patterns that are no longer productive.

An Aslian root may host a maximum of three derivational and/or inflectional prefixes/clitics.

1. Kintaq

maʔ-pi-jin-ʔam
DES-CAUS-NEG-suckle
'(she) wants to wean (the baby).'

2. Temiar

wɛ-wɛʔ lah, cə-wɛ-wɛ-barnaar naʔ
3DU-leave.PFV EMP CNTR-3DU-3DU-be.two.PROG DEM
'They both left, those who were [as already mentioned] two.'

3. Semelai

mande mə=ga=ʔəɲ=reŋ
what.sort REFL=IMM=1SG.FAM=find
'What sort of (existence) will I find?'

It was also noted that the use of the suffix in Aslian languages was a product of recent use of Malay loan words. For example, the use of the infix 'n' is prominent in various Aslian language and it encompasses a myriad of definition.

The Aslian languages, unlike their precategorial Austronesian neighbors, make clear distinctions between three major lexical categories in part of speech: nominals, verbs, and expressives. Some exceptions do exist although they are mostly Malay loanwords. Adjectives are a subclass of verbs known as stative verbs. Some closed classes such as pronouns and numerals may be considered parts of the nominal superclass. In Northern Aslian languages, the status of expressives appears to be uncertain, as they may function like typical verbs, whereas in Southern Aslian, they constitute a standalone independent lexical category.

=== Simple prefixation ===
- C(C)VC → (P)(P)–C(C)VC

Example: Jah Hut causatives

Affixes	Simplex	Causative
p-	cyɛk 'sleep'	pcyɛk 'put to sleep'
pr-	bhec 'be afraid'	prbhec 'frighten'
pn-	tlas 'escape'	pntlas 'release'
tr-	hus 'get loose (clothes)'	trhus 'undress'
kr-	lʉy 'be inside'	krlʉy 'put inside'

=== Simple infixation ===
- C (C) V C → C-I-(C) V C

Aslian languages insert infixes between two consonants. Simple infixation is when the infix is inserted into the root. The most important liquid infix is the causative -r-, which is productive in Semai and Temiar.

- Semai (root has 2 initial consonants, infix comes between them): kʔā:c 'be wet', krʔā:c 'moisten something'.

Nasal infixes are also found in Aslian, especially used as nominalizers of verbal roots.

- Jah Hut (the agentive nominalizing prefix is mʔ-): lyɛp 'plait palm leaves' → mlayɛp 'one who plaits'; cyɛk 'sleep' → mʔcyɛk 'one who sleeps a lot'

=== Reduplicative infixation: incopyfixation ===
A reduplication of the final consonant of the root is being infixed to the root. This process occurs in all 3 branches of Aslian.

1. Incopyfix of final alone (roots complex by nature):
  - Kensiw: plɔɲ 'sing' → pɲlɔɲ 'singing'
  - Che' Wong: hwæc 'whistle' → hcwæc 'whistling'
2. Root-external infix plus incopyfix. In Semai, count nouns are derived from mass nouns by using a root-external nasal infix and an incopyfix of the final. When the root-initial is simple, the incopyfix precedes the infix:
  - teːw 'river' (mass) →twneːw [tuniːw] 'id.' (count).
    When the root-initial is complex, the infix precedes the incopyfix:
  - slaːy 'swidden' (mass) → snylaːy [snilaːj] 'id.' (count)
3. Root-external prefix plus incopyfix. Simple-initialled verbs are formed by inserting the prefix n- and incopyfixing the final between prefix and the root-initial:
  - Batek: jɯk 'breathe' → nkjɯk 'the act of breathing'
4. Reduplication of the initial and a root-external infix. This is present in Semai and Temiar, which have a verbal infix -a-. In Semai, it forms resultative verbs, while in Temiar, it marks the 'simulfactive aspect'. In both languages, if the root has two consonants, the suffix-a- is inserted between them:
  - Semai: slɔːr 'lay flat objects into round container' → salɔːr 'be in layers (in round container)'
  - Temiar: slɔg 'lie down, sleep, marry' → salɔg 'go straight off to sleep'
    If the consonant initial of the root is simple, it is reduplicated so that the -a- can be inserted between the original and its copy.
  - Semai: cɛ̃ːs 'tear off' → cacɛ̃ːs 'be torn off'
  - Temiar: gəl 'sit' → gagəl 'sit down suddenly'
5. Reduplication of the initial and incopyfixation of the final. A simple initial is reduplicated for the incopyfixation of the final. In Aslian, this is used to derive the progressive verbs.
  - Batek (N.Aslian): kɯc 'grate' → kckɯc 'is grating'
  - Semelai (S.Aslian): tʰəm 'pound' → tmtʰəm 'is pounding'
  - Semai (Senoic): laal 'stick out one's tongue' → lllaal 'is sticking out one's tongue'

== Syntax ==
Aslian syntax is presumably conservative with respect to Austroasiatic as a whole, though Malay influence is apparent in some details of the grammar (e.g. use of numeral classifiers).

=== Basic and permuted word order ===
- Senoic sentences are prepositional and seem to fall into two basic types – process (active) and stative. In stative sentences, the predicate comes first:

Mənūʔ ʔəh
VP {NP (Subject)}
big it
It's big.

- In process sentences, the subject normally comes first, with the object and all other complements following the verb:

Cwəʔ yəh- mʔmus
{NP (Subj)} {P (Pfx)} V
The dog growls.

- In Jah Hut, all are complements, but the direct object require a preposition:

ʔihãh naʔ cɔp rap tuy han bulus
{NP (Subj)} Aux V {N (Obj)} Det Prep Obj
I INTENT stab boar that with spear
I'll stab that boar with a spear

- Relative clauses, similar verbal modifiers, possessives, demonstratives and attributive nouns follow their head-noun:

ʔidɔh pləʔ kɔm bɔʔ-caʔ
{NP (Subj)} {N (H)} Aux {P (Pfx) V}
this fruit can 1PL-eat
This is a fruit which we can eat.

- The negative morpheme precedes the verb, though the personal prefix may intervene before the verb root:

ʔe-loʔ tɔʔ ha-rɛɲrec sej mɛjmɛj naʔ
why Neg {P (Pfx V} {N (h)} {NP (Obj)} Det
why NEG 2-eat meat excellent that
Why didn't you eat that excellent meat?

=== Deixis, directionality and voice ===
Senoic languages set much store by deictic precision. This manifests itself in their elaborate pronominal systems, which make inclusive/exclusive and dual/plural distinctions, and take the trouble to reflect the person and number of the subject by a prefixal concordpronoun on the verb.

Locative deixis pays careful attention to the relative position (both horizontal and vertical) of speaker and hearer, even when it may be quite irrelevant to the message:

yēʔ doh ʔi-mʔog {ma hãʔ} naʔ
Pron LOC {P (Pfx)-Prt-V} Prep-pron LOC
I here will give it to you there. (I'll give it to you)

== Lexicon and semantics ==
The Aslian languages have borrowed words from each other due to mutual contact.

Austroasiatic languages have a penchant for encoding semantically complex ideas into unanalyzable, monomorphemic lexemes e.g. Semai thãʔ 'to make fun of elders sexually'. Such lexical specificity makes for a proliferation of lexicon.

Lexicon elaboration is particularly great in areas which reflect the interaction of the Aslians with their natural environment (plant and animal nomenclature, swidden agriculture terminology etc.). The greatest single sweller of the Aslian vocabulary is the class of words called expressive.

Expressives are words which describe sounds, visual phenomena, bodily sensations, emotions, smells, tastes etc., with minute precision and specificity. They are characterized by special morphophonemic patterns, and make extensive use of sound symbolism. Unlike nouns and verbs, expressives are lexically non-discrete, in that they are subject to a virtually unlimited number of semantic nuancings that are conveyed by small changes in their pronunciation.

For example, in Semai, various noises and movements of flapping wings, thrashing fish etc. are depicted by an open set of morphophonemically related expressives like parparpar, krkpur, knapurpur, purpurpur etc.

== Influences from other languages ==
The Aslian languages have links with numerous languages. This is evident in the numerous borrowings from early Austronesian languages, specifically those from Borneo. There is a possibility that migrants from Borneo settled in the Malay Peninsula 3000–4000 years ago and established cultural dominance over the Aslian speakers. Aslian words also contain words of Chamic, Acehnese and Malayic origin. For example, several Aslian languages made use of Austronesian classifiers, even though classifiers exist in the Aslian language.

Aslian languages do not succumb to any great deal of phonological change, yet borrowings from Malay are substantial. This is a result of constant interactions between the Orang Asli and Malays around the region. There is a more significant Malay influence among the nomadic Orang Asli population than within the farming Orang Asli population, as the farmers tend to be situated in the more remote areas and lead a subsistence lifestyle, and thus are less affected by interaction with the Malay language.

== Endangerment and extinction ==
All Aslian languages are endangered as they are spoken by a small group of people, with contributing factors including speaker deaths and linguistic assimilation with the Malay community. Some efforts are being made to preserve the Aslian languages in Malaysia. Some radio stations in Malaysia broadcast in Aslian languages for nine hours every day. Other media such as newspapers, magazine-type programs and dramas are broadcast in Aslian languages.

Only a small group of Orang Asli receive formal education in the Aslian languages. Most of the younger Orang Asli use Malay as the medium of instruction in school. There is currently only a total of 5 schools in the state of Pahang and 2 schools in the state of Perak which teach Aslian languages, due to the lack of qualified teachers and teaching aids, which are still in the process of development.

Some Aslian languages are already extinct, such as Wila' (also called Bila' or Lowland Semang), which was recorded having been spoken on the Province Wellesley coast opposite Penang in the early 19th century. Another extinct language is Ple-Temer, which was previously spoken near Gerik in northern Perak.
