= Ronika Power =

Australian archaeologist

Ronika K. Power
- Education: Macquarie University; University of Bradford
- Scientific career
- Workplaces: Macquarie University; University of Cambridge
- Thesis: From the cradle to the grave : child, infant and foetal burials in the Egyptian archaeological record from the Early Dynastic Period to the Middle Kingdom (ca. 3300-1650 BC) (2012)

Ronika K. Power is an Australian archaeologist who is a Professor of Bioarchaeology in the Department of History and Archaeology and Director of the Centre for Ancient Cultural Heritage and Environment at Macquarie University. Power is a Fellow of the Society of Antiquaries of London and the Royal Society of New South Wales.

== Early life and education ==
Power became interested in mummies as a child. She became ill with glandular fever and missed her high school leaving exams. She was left with chronic fatigue syndrome and remained unwell for eight years. Power was an undergraduate student at Macquarie University, where she studied ancient history. She graduated with the University Medal. After graduating Power moved to the United Kingdom, where she completed a master's degree in Palaeography at the University of Bradford. Power returned to Australia, where she completed her doctoral research in egyptology at Macquarie University. Her doctorate evaluated burials in the early Dynastic period. She was a postdoctoral fellow at the McDonald Institute for Archaeological Research.

== Research and career ==
Power worked as a European Research Council postdoctoral researcher at the University of Cambridge. As part of this work, she looked to understand the nature of connectivity in the Trans-Saharan zone. In 2014, she started working on the ERC Fragility and Sustainability in the restricted island environments of Malta (FRAGSUS) project, which studied why certain cultures maintained civilisations for centuries whilst other collapsed more quickly. FRAGSUS was the outcome of a long-term collaboration between the University of Malta and the University of Cambridge, largely driven by Caroline Malone. Power worked with the British Museum to develop Egyptian Mummies: Exploring Ancient Lives, an exhibition that ran from 2016 to 2017.

In 2016, Power returned to Macquarie University, where she was made a lecturer in bioarchaeology. Her research considers ancient human remains to better understand human health and migration. She studied the fossilised skeletons of a massacre that occurred 10,000 years ago in Lake Turkana. This study was named by Archaeology as one of the Top Ten Discoveries of 2016. Alongside her research, Power taught courses on the archaeology of death and burial. She delivered a TED talk at TEDxMelbourne in 2019.

== Awards and honours ==
- 2018 Elected Fellow of the Society of Antiquaries of London
- 2018 Appointed a Superstar of STEM
- 2019 Elected Fellow of the Royal Society of New South Wales
- 2019 Australian Academy of the Humanities Max Crawford Medal
- 2019 Union Académique Internationale Kwang-su Lim Early Career Award
- 2019 Australian Institute of Policy in Science Tall Poppy Award

== Selected publications ==
- Marta Mirazón Lahr; F Rivera; Ronika Power; et al. (20 January 2016). "Inter-group violence among early Holocene hunter-gatherers of West Turkana, Kenya". Nature. 529 (7586): 394–398. doi:10.1038/nature16477. ISSN 1476-4687. PMID 26791728. Wikidata Q30052466.
- Ronika K. Power; Yann Tristant (21 November 2016). "From refuse to rebirth: repositioning the pot burial in the Egyptian archaeological record". Antiquity. 90 (354): 1474–1488. doi:10.15184/aqy.2016.176. ISSN 0003-598X. Wikidata Q59144962.
- Michelle F. Whitford; Simon Wyatt-Spratt; Damian B. Gore; Mattias T. Johnsson; Ronika K. Power; Michael Rampe; Candace Richards; Michael J. Withford (October 2020). "Assessing the standardisation of Egyptian shabti manufacture via morphology and elemental analyses". Journal of Archaeological Science: Reports. 33 102541. doi:10.1016/j.jasrep.2020.102541. ISSN 2352-409X. Wikidata Q108194966.
