= Kintaq language =

Austroasiatic language spoken in Malaysia and Thailand

Kintaq
- Kentaq Bong
- Native to: Malaysia, Thailand
- Region: Peninsular Malaysia
- Ethnicity: 240 (2007)
- Native speakers: 110 (2008)
- Language family: Austroasiatic: Aslian; Northern Aslian; Western; Kintaq

Language codes
- ISO 639-3: knq
- Glottolog: kint1239
- ELP: Kintaq

Kintaq, or Kentaq Bong, is an Austroasiatic language spoken in Malaysia and Thailand. It belongs to the Northern Aslian sub-branch of the Aslian languages. The small number of speakers is decreasing.
