= Minriq language =

Austroasiatic language spoken in Malaysia

Menriq
- Native to: Malaysia
- Region: Kelantan
- Ethnicity: 270 (2008)
- Native speakers: 100 (2007)
- Language family: Austroasiatic: Aslian; Jahaic; Eastern; Menriq
- Writing system: Unwritten

Language codes
- ISO 639-3: mnq
- Glottolog: minr1238
- ELP: Minriq

Menriq, Mendriq or Minriq is an aboriginal Mon–Khmer language of Malaysia spoken in the Northeast peninsular, Bertam valley. It is considered definitely endangered by UNESCO.
