= Ten'edn =

Austroasiatic language of Malaysia and Thailand

- Mos, Tonga-Mos, Tonga, Maniq
- Native to: Thailand, Malaysia
- Ethnicity: Maniq
- Native speakers: 365 (2007–2014)
- Language family: Austroasiatic: Aslian; Jahaic; Ten'edn

Language codes
- ISO 639-3: tnz
- Glottolog: tong1308
- ELP: Maniq

Ten'edn, also known as Mos in Thailand and Tonga-Mos or just Tonga in some sources, is an Aslian language spoken by the Maniq people of Thailand and Malaysia.

According to Benjamin (2012), Maniq (Məniʔ, Maniʔ) can refer to the following three or more speech varieties:

- Tonga' (Toŋaʔ)
- Mos (Mɔs)
- Teanean (Ten'en, Tɛnʔɛn, Tean-ean)

== Sample vocabulary ==
Below are some odour terms in Maniq.

| Maniq language | Jahai language | Number of objects | Examples |
|---|---|---|---|
| caŋə | | 9 | tubers (Dioscorea spp.) (4), food (1), cooked food (1), cooked meat (1), rice (1), wild pig (Sus scrofa) (1), cooked wild pig (1), fresh meat (1), white sun (1) |
| caŋɛs | | 8 | animal hair (1), hair of dusky leaf monkey (Trachypithecus obscurus) (1), hair of banded leaf monkey (Presbytis femoralis) (1), hair of pig-tailed macaque (Macaca nemestrina) (1), burnt hair (1), burnt animal hair (1), roasted animal fat (1), sun (1) |
| caŋus | | 9 | soap (3), washing oneself (2), fruit (Goniothalamus sp.) (1), leaves (1), Uvaria sp. (1), clothes (1), talcum powder (1), sun (1), medicine to drink (1) |
| hamis | | 2 | sun (6), air/smoke coming from the sun (2) |
| haʔĩt | haʔɛ̃t | 10 | dead animal (3), rotting animal (3), animal (1), plantain squirrel (Callosciurus notatus) (1), Prevost’s squirrel (Callosciurus prevostii) (1), (wac caw ‘kind of squirrel’) (1), bats (1), flying fox (Pteropus cf. vampyrus) (1), tuber (Dioscorea daunea) (1), bamboo tube (1) |
| kamɛh | | 6 | (taluŋ ‘kind of millipede A’) (5), (caŋwɔɲ ‘kind of millipede B’) (1), (kaʔɔʔ basiŋ ‘kind of millipede C’) (1), Ipoh poison (Antiaris toxicaria) (1), flying fox (Pteropus cf. vampyrus) (1), forest (1) |
| kamloh | | 3 | smoke from fire (3), old shelter (1), bathing (1) |
| lspəs | ltpɨt | 14 | tuber (Dioscorea orbiculata) (2), bearcat (Arctictis binturong) (2), tuber (Dioscorea filiformis) (1), tuber (Dioscorea calcicola) (1), tubers (Dioscorea spp.) (1), new shelter (1), clean and dry clothes (1), fruit (Ficus chartacea) (1), forest (1), tree (1), animal (1), food (1), medicine to drink (1), white sun (1) |
| palɛŋ | plʔeŋ | 11 | blood (3), animal blood (1), blood of wild pig (Sus scrofa) (1), blood of pig-tailed macaque (Macaca nemestrina) (1), blood of long-tailed macaque (Macaca fascicularis) (1), blood of bearcat (Arctictis binturong) (1), raw meat (1), (pɔʔ batew ‘fern sp.’) (1), (smkam ‘plant sp.’) (1), searching for food (1), sun (1) |
| paʔɔ̞̃ʔ | | 16 | tuber (Dioscorea daunea) (2), mushroom (2), pouring water (1), fetching water (1), mud (1), digging tubers in mud (1), cooking muddy tubers (1), wet or dirty clothes (1), rotting bamboo tube (1), soil (1), searching for food (1), petai (Parkia speciosa) (1), (Parkia timoriana (1), sweat (1), urine (1), old shelter (1) |
| miʔ bayɔ̞̃ɸ | | 12 | old shelter (3), soil (2), shelter (1), mushrooms (1), skin of a dead animal (1), rotten wood (1), bamboo tube for water (1), drinking water from a bamboo tube (1), rotten leaf (1), head of banded leaf monkey (Presbytis femoralis) (1), head of pig-tailed macaque (Macaca nemestrina) (1), head of stump-tailed macaque (Macaca arctoides) (1) |
| miʔ danɔw | | 10 | mushrooms (3), rotten wood (2), rotten mushrooms (1), old shelter (1), animal bones (1), durian seed (1), snakes (1), forest (1), searching for food (1), soil (1) |
| miʔ huhũɸ | | 10 | snakes (2), soil (2), searching for tubers (1), digging tubers (1), mushrooms (1), sweat (1), rotten wood (1), walking in the forest (1), making fire (1), smoke (1) |
| miʔ latɨŋ | | 10 | soil (2), burning fire (1), (tanɔl ‘kind of fire wood A’) (1), (ɲeʔɲeʔ ‘kind of fire wood B’) (1), (tŋwaŋ ‘kind of flower’) (1), (kabɨʔ lɨkhɨ ‘kind of fruit’) (1), (bacen ‘food item (unknown)’) (1), mushrooms (1), tree (1), walking in the forest (1) |
| miʔ ɲətuʔ | | 7 | tree sap (1), leaves (1), garlic (1), soil (1), forest (1), searching for food (1), (kabɨʔ ɲɛʔɲɛʔ ‘kind of fruit) (1) |

== See also ==
- Jahai language
