= Jahai language =

Austroasiatic language spoken in Malaysia

Jahai
- Native to: Malaysia, a few in Thailand
- Ethnicity: 1,800 Jahai people (2008)
- Native speakers: 1,000 in Malaysia (2006)
- Language family: Austroasiatic: Aslian; Jahaic; Eastern; Jahai

Language codes
- ISO 639-3: jhi
- Glottolog: jeha1242
- ELP: Jahai

Jahai (Jehai) is an aboriginal Mon–Khmer language spoken by the Jahai people living in the montane rainforests of northern Peninsular Malaysia and southernmost Thailand. It is the largest Northern Aslian language. Though spoken by only a little more than 1,000 people, Jahai does not appear to be in immediate danger of extinction due to the prevalence of Jahai parents passing on the language to their children as their mother tongue.

Jahai has a unique vocabulary for describing odors.

== Phonology ==
=== Vowels ===
Jahai vowels
	Front	Central	Back
Close	i ĩ	ɨ ɨ̃	u ũ
Close-mid	e		o
Open-mid	ɛ ɛ̃	ə ə̃	ɔ ɔ̃
Open		a ã	

=== Consonants ===
Jahai consonants
		Bilabial	Alveolar	Palatal	Velar	Glottal
Nasal		m	n	ɲ	ŋ	
Plosive	voiceless	p	t	c	k	ʔ
Plosive	voiced	b	d	ɟ	ɡ	ʔ
Fricative		ɸ		s		h
Lateral			l			
Rhotic			ɾ~r			
Approximant		w		j		

=== Syllable structure ===
On the surface level, the maximal syllable in Jahai is represented as CV(C). The onset consonant is obligatorily required.

=== Stress and tone ===
The position of stress always falls on the last syllable. Burenhult states there is no tonal distinction in Jahai language.

== Olfactory categories ==
Odor terms in Jahai are based on abstract qualities rather than specific sources (which is more common cross-linguistically, particularly in European languages).

Odor terms
Odor terms	Approximate translation	Examples of sources	Notes
cŋəs	'to smell edible, tasty'	cooked food, sweets	
crŋir	'to smell roasted'	roasted food	
harɨm	'to be fragrant'	various flowers, perfumes, soap	Malay loan; original Malay meaning 'fragrant'
ltpɨt	'to be fragrant'	various flowers, perfumes, binturong	
haʔɛ̃t	'to stink'	feces, rotten meat, prawn paste	
pʔus	'to be musty'	old dwellings, mushrooms, stale food	
cŋɛs	'to have a stinging smell'	petrol, smoke, bat droppings	
sʔı̃ŋ	'to have a smell of human urine'	human urine, village ground	
haɲcı̃ŋ	'to have a urine-like smell'	urine	Malay loan; original Malay meaning 'foul odor, stench'
pʔih, plʔeŋ	'to have a blood/fish/meat-like smell'	blood, raw fish, raw meat	
plʔɛŋ	'to have a bloody smell which attracts tigers'	crushed head lice, squirrel blood	

== See also ==
- Kensiu language
