= List of ambassadors and high commissioners of Malaysia =

The following is the list of ambassadors and high commissioners of Malaysia. High commissioners represent member states of the Commonwealth of Nations and ambassadors represent other states. Note that some diplomats are accredited by, or to, more than one country.

== Current ambassadors of Malaysia ==
Bold indicates the resident countries of the Malaysian diplomatic missions.

Host country	Appointed	Location of resident embassy	Ambassador	List	Embassy website
**Algeria**; Tunisia	15 June 2021	Algiers	H.E. Mohammad Faizal Razali	List	
**Argentina**; Paraguay; Uruguay	15 June 2021	Buenos Aires	H.E. Nur Azman Abdul Rahim	List	
**Australia**	28 October 2023	Canberra	H.E. Datin Paduka Sharrina Abdullah (High Commissioner)	List	
**Austria**; Slovakia	15 June 2021	Vienna	H.E. Ikram Mohd Ibrahim	List	
**Azerbaijan**	2019	Baku	H.E. Yubazlan Yusof	List	
**Bahrain**	15 June 2021	Manama	H.E. Shazryll Zahiran	List	
**Bangladesh**	30 December 2024	Dhaka	H.E. Mohd Shuhada Othman (High Commissioner)	List	
**Belgium**; Luxembourg	15 June 2021	Brussels	H.E. Dato' Ahmad Rozian Abd Ghani	List	
**Bosnia and Herzegovina**; Montenegro	15 June 2021	Sarajevo	H.E. Raja Saifful Ridzuwan Raja Kamaruddin	List	
**Brazil**; Guyana; Suriname	2017	Brasília	H.E. Lim Juay Jin	List	
**Brunei**	15 June 2021	Bandar Seri Begawan	H.E. Raja Dato' Reza Raja Zaib Shah	List	
**Cambodia**	2019	Phnom Penh	H.E. Eldeen Husaini Mohd Hashim	List	
**Canada**	15 June 2021	Ottawa	H.E. Shazelina Zainul Abidin (High Commissioner)	List	
**Chile**; Ecuador	2020	Santiago	H.E. Abu Bakar Mamat	List	
**China**; Mongolia	2019	Beijing	H.E. Raja Nushirwan Zainal Abidin	List	
**Croatia**	15 June 2021	Zagreb	H.E. Kennedy Mayong Onon	List	
**Cuba**; Bahamas; Dominican Republic; Haiti; Jamaica; Nicaragua	2018	Havana	H.E. Roslan Abdul Rahman	List	
**Czech Republic**	2017	Prague	H.E. Zanariah Zainal Abidin	List	
**Egypt**; Palestine	15 June 2021	Cairo	H.E. Zamani Ismail	List	
**Fiji**; Kiribati; Nauru; Tonga; Tuvalu	2018	Suva	H.E. Ilham Tuah Illias (High Commissioner)	List	
**Finland**; Estonia; Latvia	2019	Helsinki	H.E. John K. Samuel	List	
**France**; Monaco; Portugal	15 June 2021	Paris	H.E. Dato' Mohd Zamruni Khalid	List	
**Germany**	2023	Berlin	Mohd Shahafeez Shaharis (Chargé d'affaires a.i.)	List	
**Ghana**; Niger; São Tomé and Príncipe; Togo	2022	Accra	Ron Dlyan Anak Jeffry (Chargé d'affaires a.i.)	List	
**Guinea**; Ivory Coast; Guinea-Bissau; Liberia; Sierra Leone	2021	Conakry	Ahmad Irshad Razib (Chargé d'affaires a.i.)	List	
**Holy See**; Albania; Malta	2019	Rome	H.E. Westmoreland Edward Palon	List	
**Hungary**; North Macedonia; Slovenia	15 June 2021	Budapest	H.E. Francisco Munis	List	
**India**; Afghanistan	2017	New Delhi	H.E. Hidayat Abdul Hamid (High Commissioner)	List	
**Indonesia**	2021	Jakarta	Adlan Bin Mohd Shaffieq (Chargé d'affaires a.i.)	List	
**Iran**	2023	Tehran	Mohd Nizam Halimi (Chargé d'affaires a.i.)	List	
**Ireland**	2019	Dublin	H.E. Zakaria Nasir	List	
**Italy**; Kosovo; San Marino	2017	Rome	H.E. Abdul Malik Melvin Castelino Anthony	List	
**Japan**; Federated States of Micronesia; Marshall Islands	2019	Tokyo	H.E. Kennedy Jawan	List	
**Jordan**; Iraq	2017	Amman	H.E. Jilid Kuminding	List	
**Kazakhstan**	2017	Astana	H.E. Syed Mohamad Bakri Syed Abd Rahman	List	
**Kenya**; Burundi; Rwanda; South Sudan; Tanzania; Uganda	2017	Nairobi	H.E. Loh Seck Tiong (High Commissioner)	List	
**Kuwait**	2018	Kuwait City	H.E. Mohammad Ali Selamat	List	
**Laos**	2017	Vientiane	H.E. Mohd Aini Atan	List	
**Lebanon**; Cyprus; Syria	15 June 2021	Beirut	H.E. Azri Mat Yacob	List	
**Mexico**; Belize; Guatemala; El Salvador; Honduras; Costa Rica	2018	Mexico City	H.E. Muzafar Shah Mustafa	List	
**Morocco**; Mauritania	2017	Rabat	H.E. Astanah Banu Shri Abdul Aziz	List	
**Myanmar**	2018	Yangon	H.E. Zahairi Baharim	List	
**Namibia**; Angola; Republic of the Congo; Democratic Republic of the Congo	2016	Windhoek	H.E. Hishamuddin Ibrahim (High Commissioner)	List	
**Nepal**	2022	Kathmandu	Mohd Fadzle Abu Hasan (Chargé d'affaires a.i.)	List	
**Netherlands**	15 June 2021	The Hague	H.E. Dato' Nadzirah Osman	List	
**New Zealand**; Cook Islands; Niue; Samoa	2017	Wellington	H.E. Nur Izzah Wong Mee Choo (High Commissioner)	List	
**Nigeria**; Benin; Cameroon; Chad; Central African Republic; Equatorial Guinea; Gabon	2018	Abuja	H.E. Gloria Corina Peter Tiwet (High Commissioner)	List	
**Oman**; Yemen; Djibouti	15 June 2021	Muscat	H.E. Shaiful Ahmad Mohammad	List	
**Pakistan**	2017	Islamabad	H.E. Ikram Mohammad Ibrahim (High Commissioner)	List	
**Papua New Guinea**; Solomon Islands; Vanuatu	2018	Port Moresby	H.E. Mohamad Nasri Abdul Rahman (High Commissioner)	List	
**Peru**; Bolivia; Colombia; Panama	2019	Lima	H.E. Fenny Nuli	List	
**Philippines**; Palau	2019	Manila	H.E. Norman Muhamad	List	
**Poland**; Lithuania	2018	Warsaw	H.E. Chitra Devi V. Ramiah	List	
**Qatar**	2020	Doha	H.E. Zamshari Shaharan	List	
**Romania**; Bulgaria; Greece; Moldova	15 June 2021	Bucharest	H.E. Tengku Dato' Sirajuzzaman Tengku Mohamed Ariffin	List	
**Russia**; Armenia; Belarus	2020	Moscow	H.E. Bala Chandran Tharman	List	
**Saudi Arabia**	2019	Riyadh	H.E. Abd Razak Abdul Wahab	List	
**Senegal**; Burkina Faso; Cape Verde; Gambia; Mali	2017	Dakar	H.E. Dr. Shazelina Zainul Abidin	List	
**Serbia**	2023	Belgrade	Khairul Tazril Tarmizi (Chargé d'affaires a.i.)	List	
**Singapore**	15 June 2021	Singapore	H.E. Dato' Indera Dr. Azfar Mohamad Mustafar	List	
**South Africa**; Botswana; Lesotho; Madagascar; Mozambique; Eswatini	2018	Pretoria	H.E. Mohamad Nizan Mohamad (High Commissioner)	List	
**South Korea**	2023	Seoul	Ahmad Fahmi Ahmad Sarkawi (Chargé d'affaires a.i.)	List	
**Spain**; Andorra	2019	Madrid	H.E. Akmal Che Mustafa	List	
**Sri Lanka**; Maldives	2018	Colombo	H.E. Tan Yang Thai (High Commissioner)	List	
**Sudan**; Eritrea; Ethiopia; Somalia	2018	Khartoum	H.E. Mohamad Razdan Jamil	List	
**Sweden**; Denmark; Iceland; Norway	2019	Stockholm	H.E. Nur Ashikin Mohd. Taib	List	
**Switzerland**	2017	Bern	H.E. Sharrina Abdullah	List	
**Taiwan**^{1}	2019	Taipei	Sharon Ho Swee Peng (President of MFTC)	List	
**Thailand**	2017	Bangkok	H.E. Jojie Samuel MC Samuel	List	
**Timor-Leste**	2018	Dili	H.E. Sarimah Akbar	List	
**Turkey**	2020	Ankara	H.E. Sazali Mustafa Kamal	List	
**Turkmenistan**	2016	Ashgabat	H.E. Roseli Abdul	List	
**Ukraine**; Georgia	2018	Kyiv	H.E. Raja Reza Raja Zaib Shah	List	
**United Arab Emirates**	Vacant	Abu Dhabi	Position under appointment	List	
**United Kingdom**	15 June 2021	London	H.E. Zakri Jaafar (High Commissioner)	List	
**United States**	2025	Washington, D.C.	H.E. Muhammad Shahrul Ikram Yaakob	List	
**Uzbekistan**; Kyrgyzstan; Tajikistan	2018	Tashkent	H.E. Hendy Assan	List	
**Venezuela**; Antigua and Barbuda; Barbados; Dominica; Grenada; Saint Kitts and Nevis; Saint Lucia; Saint Vincent and the Grenadines; Trinidad and Tobago	2023	Caracas	Mohd Raizul Nizam Zulkiffli (Chargé d'affaires a.i.)	List	
**Vietnam**	2019	Hanoi	H.E. Shariffah Norhana Syed Mustaffa	List	
**Zimbabwe**; Comoros; Malawi; Mauritius; Seychelles; Zambia	2022	Harare	Tan Tsiu Yin (Chargé d'affaires a.i.)	List	

^{1} Taiwan is listed as "Taiwan, China" by Malaysia due to diplomatic recognition of the One-China Policy.

== See also ==
- Foreign relations of Malaysia
- List of diplomatic missions of Malaysia
