= List of high commissioners of Malaysia to Canada =

High Commissioner of Malaysia to Canada
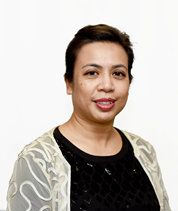
- Incumbent; Shazelina Zainul Abidin since 25 November 2024
- Style: Her Excellency
- Seat: Ottawa, Canada
- Appointer: Yang di-Pertuan Agong
- Inaugural holder: Omar Ong Yoke Lin as Chargé d'Affaires
- Formation: April 1967
- Website: www.kln.gov.my/web/can_ottawa/home

The high Commissioner of Malaysia to Canada is the head of Malaysia's diplomatic mission to Canada. The position has the rank and status of an ambassador extraordinary and plenipotentiary and is based in the High Commission of Malaysia, Ottawa.

== List of heads of mission ==
=== Chargé d'affaires to Canada ===
Chargé d'Affaires	Term start	Term end
Accredited from Washington, D.C.
Omar Ong Yoke Lin	April 1967	April 1968

=== High commissioners to Canada ===
High Commissioner	Term start	Term end
Mohd Ismail Yusof	11 April 1968	2 November 1969
Zakaria Mohd Ali	23 April 1970	6 November 1974
Albert S. Talalla	24 March 1975	14 April 1978
Ahmad Zainal Abidin Mohamed Yusof	16 May 1978	15 September 1980
Bakri Aiyub Ghazali	8 June 1981	25 April 1986
Thomas Jayasuria	18 June 1986	8 June 1990
Ahmad Faiz Abdul Hamid	28 September 1990	30 September 1994
Abdullah Zawawi Mohamed	6 December 1993	December 1997
Omardin Abdul Wahab	5 May 1998	20 November 2001
Dennis J. Ignatius	13 December 2001	26 June 2008
Selwyn Das	11 February 2009	12 November 2010
Hayati Ismail	9 March 2011	9 September 2015
Aminahtun Karim Shaharudin	19 January 2016	18 July 2019
Nor'Aini Abd Hamid	18 July 2019	15 June 2021
Anizan @ Siti Hajjar Adnin	15 June 2021	November 2023
Shazelina Zainul Abidin	25 November 2024	Incumbent

== See also ==
- Canada–Malaysia relations
