= Endorsements in the 2018 Malaysian general election =

This page is a list of individuals and organisations who have endorsed parties or individual candidates for the 2018 Malaysian general election. The final election was won by the Pakatan Harapan coalition led by Mahathir Mohamad.

== Endorsements for parties ==
=== Individuals ===
==== Barisan Nasional ====
- Abdullah Ahmad Badawi, politician and former prime minister
- Jamal Abdillah, singer and actor
- Azwan Ali, actor and television host
- Zizan Razak, comedian, actor and singer
- Rosyam Nor, actor, television host and film producer
- Fattah Amin, actor and singer
- Shaheizy Sam, actor and singer

==== Pakatan Harapan ====
- Ahmed Mahloof, Maldivian MP
- Kimberley Motley, American attorney
- Siti Nurhaliza, singer and businesswoman
- Sheila Majid, singer
- Rozita Che Wan, actor and comedian
- Adibah Noor, singer and actress
- Daphne Iking, television host and actress
- Nur Fathia, actress and model
- Afdlin Shauki, actor and comedian
- Sharnaaz Ahmad, actor
- Hairul Azreen, martial artist, actor and stuntman
- Ummi Hafilda Ali, businesswoman
- Rafidah Aziz, politician
- Daim Zainuddin, politician and businessman
- Rais Yatim, politician and lawyer
- Abby Abadi, singer and actress
- Ambiga Sreenevasan, lawyer and human rights advocate
- Maria Chin Abdullah, activist
- Abdul Samad Said, laureate, novelist and poet
- Wan Aishah, singer
- Wardina Safiyyah, actress, model and television host
- Yasin Sulaiman, singer
- Yeop Adlan Che Rose, former diplomat
- Redzuawan Ismail a.k.a. Chef Wan, celebrity chef, television host, actor and restaurateur.

==== Parti Islam Se-Malaysia ====
- Muhamad Radhi Mat Din, football coach and former footballer
- Raja Petra Kamarudin, blogger and editor

=== Organisations ===
==== Pakatan Harapan ====
- Hindu Rights Action Force
- Bersih
- Catholic Bishops' Conference of Malaysia, Singapore and Brunei
- Malaysian Trades Union Congress

=== Parties ===
Some parties which only contest elections in certain parts of Malaysia have endorsed political parties in areas they don't contest.

==== Pakatan Harapan ====
- Socialist Party of Malaysia
- Sabah Heritage Party
- Minority Rights Action Party

==== Sabah Heritage Party ====
- Pakatan Harapan
