= Tengku Abdul Aziz =

Malaysian diplomat (1933–2020)

- تڠكو عبدالعزيز

Ambassador of Malaysia to the Netherlands
- In office 26 September 1978 – 28 October 1982
- Preceded by: Ungku Nazaruddin
- Succeeded by: K. Thamaratnam

Ambassador of Malaysia to Saudi Arabia
- In office 1975–1978

Personal details
- Born: 10 September 1933 Kota Bharu, Kelantan, Unfederated Malay States, British Malaya (now Malaysia)
- Died: 20 September 2020 (aged 87) Gleneagles Hospital Kuala Lumpur, Kuala Lumpur, Malaysia
- Resting place: Langgar Royal Mausoleum, Kelantan, Malaysia
- Spouse: Tengku Merjan (m. 1960; died 2020)
- Relations: Raja Perempuan Tengku Anis (niece/sister-in-law)
- Children: Tengku Mohamad Rizam; Tengku Ramizan; Tengku Mohamed Rizal; Tengku Mohamad Ridzman
- Parent(s): Tengku Mohd Hamzah (father); Nik Zainab Ismail (mother)
- Relatives: Tengku Azizah (sister); Tengku Zain (sister); Tengku Maziah (sister); Tengku Razaleigh (brother); Tengku Robert (brother)
- Occupation: Diplomat

Tengku Abdul Aziz bin Tengku Mohd Hamzah (Jawi: تڠكو عبدالعزيزبن تڠکو محمد حمزة; 10 September 1933 – 20 September 2020) was a Malaysian diplomat and member of the Kelantan royal family. He served as the Ambassador of Malaysia to the Kingdom of Saudi Arabia from 1975 to 1978 and the Kingdom of the Netherlands from 1978 to 1982. He was the elder brother of the former Member of Parliament for Gua Musang, Tengku Razaleigh Hamzah.

== Early life and education ==
Tengku Abdul Aziz was born in Kota Bharu, Kelantan on 10 September 1933. He was the eldest son and fourth child of the 12th Menteri Besar of Kelantan, Tengku Sri Maharaja Tengku Muhammad Hamzah bin Tengku Zainal Abidin by his wife, Nik Zainab binti Ismail. He was also the uncle and brother-in-law of Raja Perempuan Tengku Anis binti Almarhum Tengku Abdul Hamid, the wife of the 28th Sultan of Kelantan, Sultan Ismail Petra ibni Almarhum Sultan Yahya Petra. He received his early education at Padang Garong Malay School in addition to receiving religious education at his home. In 1945, he studied at Sultan Ismail College and between 1956 and 1958, he continued his studies in Australia.

== Appointment history ==
Tengku Abdul Aziz was appointed as the Regent of Kelantan twice. The first time was when his father-in-law, Sultan Yahya Petra was visiting Japan, Taiwan and Hong Kong, where he became Regent for two months, starting from 18 April 1966 until 3 July 1966. When his father-in-law underwent surgery at the General Hospital in Kuala Lumpur, Tengku Abdul Aziz served again as the Regent for two months from 13 December 1967 to 4 February 1968.

Tengku Abdul Aziz was appointed as the President of State Royal Succession Council of Kelantan (Malay: Majlis Perajaan Negeri Kelantan) on 21 September 1965 before being replaced by Tengku Laksamana Kelantan Tengku Abdul Halim Ibni Almarhum Sultan Ibrahim on 25 April 2010.

Tengku Abdul Aziz was the President of the Kelantan Islamic Religious and Malay Customs Council (MAIK) from 1 January 1967 to 31 May 1975.

Tengku Abdul Aziz was appointed as the Malaysian Ambassador to the Kingdom of Saudi Arabia from 1975 to 1978 and the Malaysian Ambassador to the Kingdom of the Netherlands from 1978 to 1982.

== Personal life ==
Tengku Abdul Aziz married Tengku Merjan, the eldest daughter of the 27th Sultan of Kelantan, Sultan Yahya Petra on 22 January 1960. As a result of this marriage, they had three sons and one daughter: Tengku Mohamad Rizam (Tengku Temenggong of Kelantan), Tengku Ramizan, Tengku Mohamed Rizal and Tengku Mohamad Ridzman.

== Death ==
Tengku Abdul Aziz died at Gleneagles Hospital Kuala Lumpur at 2:37 am on 20 September 2020. He was buried at Kelantan Royal Mausoleum in Kota Bharu, Kelantan.

== Honours ==
Tengku Abdul Aziz was conferred the title of Tengku Sri Utama Raja by his father-in-law, Sultan Yahya Petra in 1962. Among the orders conferred upon him such as:

- Kelantan
  - Recipient of the Royal Family Order of Kelantan (DK) (1968, revoked 8 February 2014 and reinstated June 2018)
  - Knight Grand Commander of the Order of the Life of the Crown of Kelantan (SJMK) – Dato' (1965, revoked 8 February 2014)
  - Knight Commander of the Order of the Life of the Crown of Kelantan (DJMK) – Dato' (1962)
  - ~~Tengku Sri Utama Raja~~ (1962, revoked 8 February 2014)
  - Silver medal of the Sultan Yahya Petra Coronation Medal (1961)
- Brunei
  - Sultan Hassanal Bolkiah Coronation Medal (1 August 1968)
