= List of ambassadors of Malaysia to Peru =

Ambassador of Malaysia to Peru
- Incumbent; Ahmad Irham Ikmal Hisham since September 24, 2024
- Style: His Excellency
- Seat: Lima, Peru
- Appointer: Yang di-Pertuan Agong
- Inaugural holder: Ahmad Mokhtar Selat
- Formation: 16 October 1996
- Website: www.kln.gov.my/web/per_lima/home

The ambassador of Malaysia to the Republic of Peru is the head of Malaysia's diplomatic mission to Peru. The position has the rank and status of an ambassador extraordinary and plenipotentiary and is based in the Embassy of Malaysia, Lima.

== List of heads of mission ==
Ambassador	Term start	Term end	Notes
Ahmad Mokhtar Selat	16 October 1996		He was one of the hostages during the Japanese embassy hostage crisis.
Mohd. Yusof Ahmad	25 August 1999		
Abdul Jalil Haron	3 June 2003		
Mohd Nor Atan	23 January 2006		
Ahmad Izlan Idris	16 September 2008		
Ayauf Bachi	19 September 2011		
Chuah Teong Ban	28 March 2016		
Fenny Nuli	3 December 2019	2023	Nuli arrived in Peru on November 15, 2019, and delivered her credentials on December 3.
Ahmad Irham Ikmal Hisham	25 September 2024	Present	Ahmad Irham Ikmal Hisham arrived in Peru on September 25, 2024, and delivered his credential on October 2, 2024.

== See also ==
- Malaysia–Peru relations
- List of ambassadors of Peru to Malaysia
