= Peru–Singapore relations =

- Peru: Singapore

Diplomatic mission
- Embassy of Peru, Singapore: None (Accredited from Singapore)

Peru–Singapore relations are the bilateral relations between the Republic of Peru and the Republic of Singapore. Peru has an embassy in Singapore, while Singapore is accredited to Peru from its embassy in Brasília, Brazil. Both countries are members of the World Trade Organization, Non-Aligned Movement, Asia-Pacific Economic Cooperation and the United Nations.

== History ==
Both countries established relations in 1980, when the ambassadors of both countries to the United Nations exchanged formal notes to officially establish relations between each other's countries on October 27 of that year.

Foreign Minister K. Shanmugam visited Peru in 2013 to further relations, and Prime Minister Lee Hsien Loong was one of the attendees during APEC Peru 2016, having visited Peru once in 2008.

== High-level visits ==
High-level visits from Singapore to Peru

- Foreign Minister K. Shanmugam (2013)
- Prime Minister Lee Hsien Loong (2008 & 2016)

== Trade ==
Peru and Singapore signed a free trade agreement that entered into force on August 1, 2009. As of 2018, Peru is Singapore's 12th largest trading partner in Latin America.

== Resident diplomatic missions ==
- Peru has an embassy in Singapore.
- Singapore is accredited to Peru from Singapore and has an honorary consulate-general in Lima.

== See also ==
- Foreign relations of Peru
- Foreign relations of Singapore
- List of ambassadors of Peru to Singapore
