= Halimahton Abdul Majid =

Malaysian politician

Member of the Federal Legislative Council
- In office 1955–1959
- Succeeded by: Ong Yoke Lin
- Constituency: Ulu Selangor

Personal details
- Born: 1920; Kampung Baru, Selangor
- Died: 1980s

Che Halimahton binti Abdul Majid DPMS (1920–1980s) was a Malaysian politician. She was the first woman elected to the Federal Legislative Council, serving from 1955 to 1959.

== Biography ==
Halimahton was born in the Kampung Baru area of Kuala Lumpur in 1920. She was educated at the Methodist Girls' School and later studied domestic science in Cambridge. She married Mohamad Baba, while her sister Ton Puan married Ghazali Shafie, who later served as a minister. A keen sportswoman, she played hockey and badminton.

Entering political activism, Halimahton organised a women's protest against the proposed Malayan Union during a visit by British officials in 1946. The following year she joined the committee of the new Malay Girls' School in Kuala Lumpur. She became head of the Negri Sembilan branch of the United Malays National Organisation (UNMO) in 1949.

In the 1955 general elections, Halimahton was nominated as the UNMO candidate for Ulu Selangor. The only female candidate in the election, she defeated her Parti Negara opponent to become the first woman MP. She did not contest the seat in the 1959 elections.

Having formerly been chairman of Keretapi Tanah Melayu, her husband was appointed High Commissioners Malaysia to Pakistan in 1962, with the couple relocating to Karachi. In 1966 he was appointed to the same role in Australia.

She died in the 1980s.
