= Argentina–Malaysia relations =

- Argentina: Malaysia

Diplomatic mission
- Argentine Embassy, Kuala Lumpur: Malaysian Embassy, Buenos Aires

Envoy
- Ambassador Manuel Jose Balaguer Salas: Vacant

Bilateral foreign relations between Argentina and Malaysia, have existed for decades. Argentina has an embassy in Kuala Lumpur, and Malaysia has an embassy in Buenos Aires.

== History ==
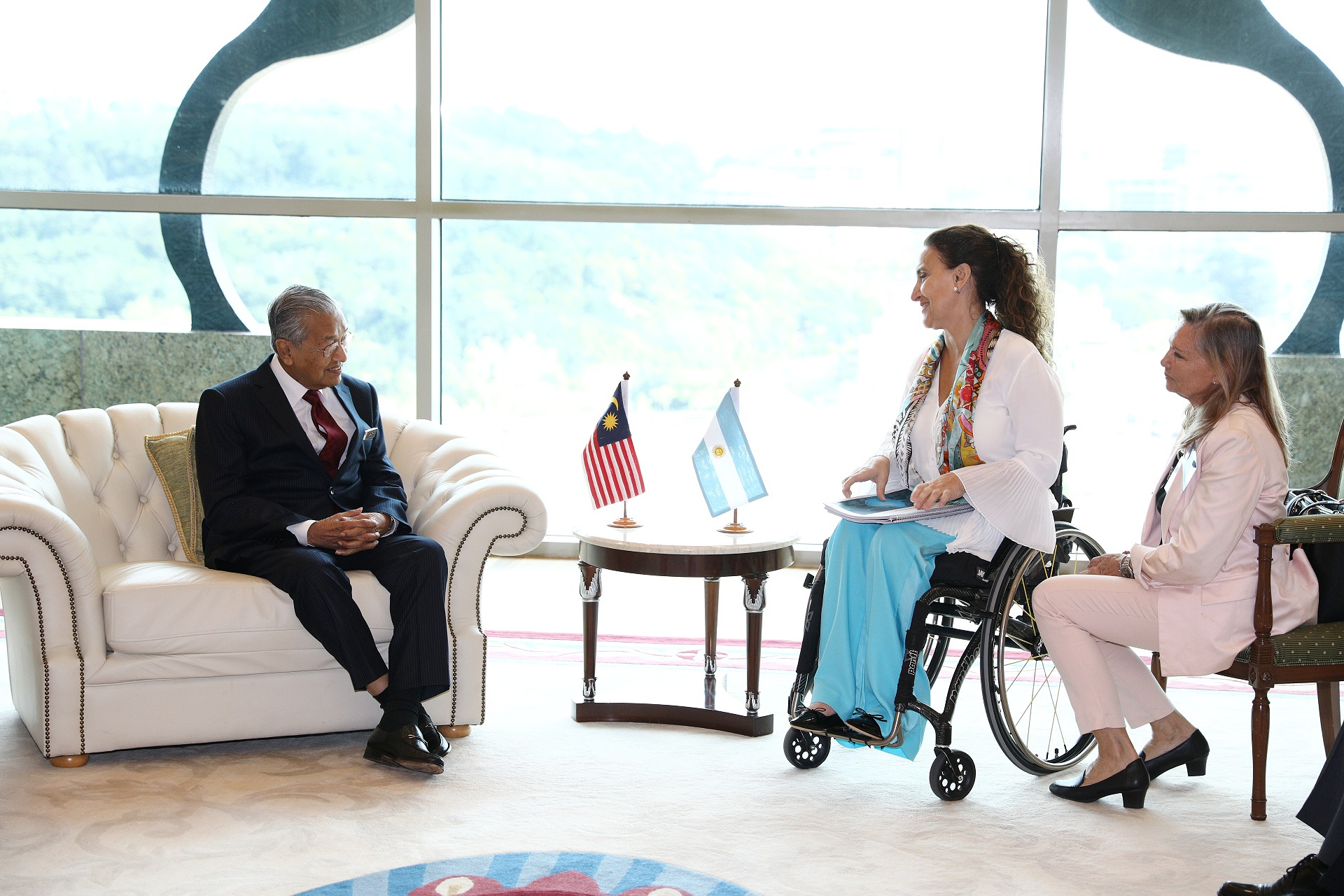
Malaysian Prime Minister Mahathir Mohamad met with Argentine Vice President Gabriela Michetti on May 6, 2019

Argentina established diplomatic relations with Malaysia on 7 June 1967, four years after the formation of the Federation of Malaysia and the first Argentine embassy was opened in Kuala Lumpur in August 1983. While, Malaysia opened its embassy in Buenos Aires in 1989.

== Economic relations ==
Malaysia is the 33rd main market and the 8th main Asian customer for Argentina after China, Japan, India, South Korea, Thailand, United Arab Emirates and Israel. In 2002, Argentine exports to Malaysia worth around $218 million and Malaysian exports total around $43 million. The main Argentine products exported to Malaysia are mostly agricultural and industrial products while Malaysian exports to Argentina in the classification of capital and intermediate goods.

== Agreements ==
An agreement on the exemption of taxes on ships and aircraft operating in the international traffic has been signed between the two countries and takes into effect in 1997.
