= List of ambassadors of Malaysia to Nepal =

Ambassador of Malaysia to Nepal
- Incumbent; Vacant
- Style: His Excellency
- Seat: Kathmandu, Nepal
- Appointer: Yang di-Pertuan Agong
- Inaugural holder: Wan Jaafar Wan Mahamud as Chargé d'Affaires
- Formation: December 2003
- Website: www.kln.gov.my/web/npl_kathmandu/home

The ambassador of Malaysia to the Federal Democratic Republic of Nepal is the head of Malaysia's diplomatic mission to Nepal. The position has the rank and status of an ambassador extraordinary and plenipotentiary and is based in the Embassy of Malaysia, Kathmandu.

== List of heads of mission ==
=== Chargés d'Affaires to Nepal ===
| Chargé d'Affaires | Term start | Term end |
|---|---|---|
| Wan Jaafar Wan Mahamud | December 2003 | November 2004 |
| Fadli Adilah | September 2011 | January 2016 |
| Ahmad Phadil Ismail | | |

=== Ambassadors to Nepal ===
| Ambassador | Term start | Term end |
|---|---|---|
| Mahinder Singh | November 2004 | November 2007 |
| Ilankovan Kolandavelu | November 2007 | June 2011 |

== See also ==
- Malaysia–Nepal relations
