= Sharrina Abdullah =

Malaysian diplomat

Sharrina Abdullah is a Malaysian diplomat who is Ambassador to Switzerland and was Ambassador to Senegal. She presented her credentials in Senegal on February 17, 2014.
