= Canada–Malaysia relations =

- Canada: Malaysia

Canada and Malaysia have a long history of close and friendly bilateral relations. Canada and was one of the first countries to recognise Malaysia's independence. Canada has a high commission in Kuala Lumpur, and Malaysia has a high commission in Ottawa. Both countries are full members of the Commonwealth of Nations.

Former Canadian Prime Minister Justin Trudeau claims partial Malay ancestry.

== Science and technologies ==
Canada and Malaysia have strengthening ties in sectors such as aerospace, green technology, agriculture, transport, oil and gas.

Notably, Petronas (the Malaysian state-owned oil and gas company) has a 25% equity ownership in LNG Canada, which at CAD 40 billion, is the largest private sector investment in Canadian history. Canada is Petronas' second largest resource holder, after Malaysia.

== Trade ==
Canada's trade relationship with Malaysia includes commerce across several sectors. Malaysia is also one of the members of the Trans-Pacific Strategic Economic Partnership which Canada joined in 2012. In 2018, Canada seeking to enhanced the trade relations with the Malaysian state of Sabah especially in infrastructure, energy, information and communications technology, water treatment and waste since it has expertise in these areas as well in education.

== Resident diplomatic missions ==
=== High Commission of Malaysia, Ottawa ===
High Commission of Malaysia in Ottawa
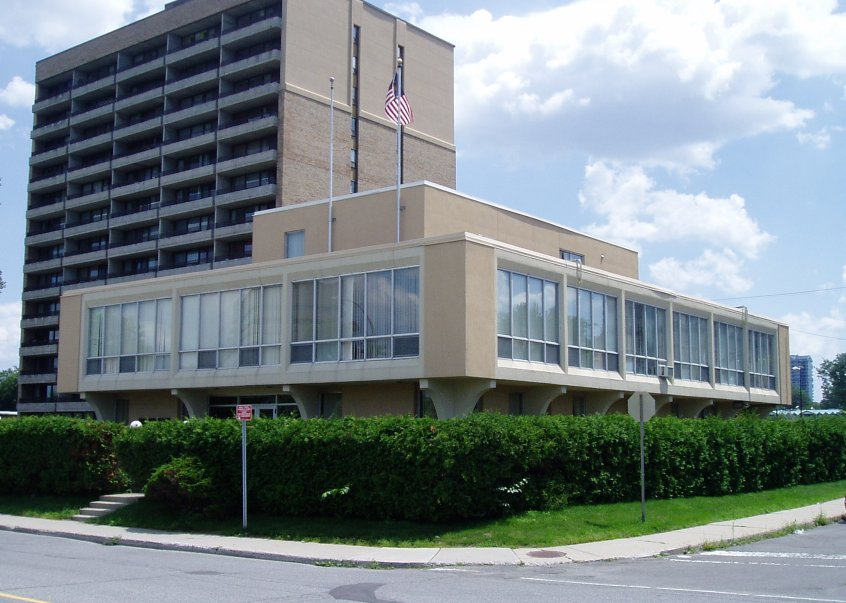
- Location: Ottawa
- Address: 60 Boteler Street
- High Commissioner: Anizan @ Siti Hajjar Adnin
- Website: High Commission of Malaysia, Ottawa

The High Commission of Malaysia in Ottawa is Malaysia's primary diplomatic mission in Canada. It is located at 60 Boteler Street in Ottawa (45.433949°N 75.697474°W). The first High Commissioner of Malaysia to Canada was Tan Sri Ong Yoke Lin, who was appointed in April 1967.

The current High Commissioner of Malaysia to Canada is Her Excellency Dr Shazelina Zainul Abidin, since December 2024, who replaced Her Excellency Amb. Siti Hajjar Adnin @ Anizan.

=== High Commission of Canada, Kuala Lumpur ===
High Commission of Canada in Kuala Lumpur
- Location: 50400 Kuala Lumpur
- Address: 17th Floor, Menara Tan & Tan 207 Jalan Tun Razak
- High Commissioner: Wayne Robson
- Website: High Commission of Canada in Malaysia

The High Commission of Canada in Malaysia is found in Kuala Lumpur. The High Commissioner is Wayne Robson. There is also a consulate headed by an honorary consul in Penang.

== See also ==
- Malaysian Canadians
- Foreign relations of Canada
- Foreign relations of Malaysia
