= P. G. Lim =

Malaysian diplomat and lawyer (1915–2013)

Yang Berbahagia Tan Sri Dato’ P. G. Lim PSM DMPN DPMP

2nd Ambassador of Malaysia to Belgium
- In office 18 February 1977 – 27 September 1979
- Preceded by: Peter Stephen Lai
- Succeeded by: Kassim Hussein

Personal details
- Born: Lim Phaik Gan; 29 June 1915 London, United Kingdom
- Died: 7 May 2013 (aged 97) Perth, Western Australia

P. G. Lim

Chinese name
- Traditional Chinese: 林碧顏
- Simplified Chinese: 林碧颜
- Hanyu Pinyin: Lín Bìyán
- Jyutping: Lam4 Bik1 Ngaan4
- Hokkien POJ: Lîm Phek-gân
- Tâi-lô: Lîm Phik-gân

Tan Sri Lim Phaik Gan, known as P. G. Lim, (Chinese: 林碧顏; pinyin: Lín Bìyán; Jyutping: Lam4 Bik1 Ngaan4; Pe̍h-ōe-jī: Lîm Phek-gân; 29 June 1915 – 7 May 2013) was a British-born Malaysian lawyer and diplomat. She was one of the first female lawyers to practice in Malaysia. Lim also served as Malaysia's first female ambassador. She served as Malaysia's Ambassador to the United Nations, Yugoslavia, Austria, and the European Economic Community during her diplomatic career.

== Early life ==
Lim was born in London, United Kingdom in 1915. Her father, Lim Cheng Ean (Chinese: 林清淵; pinyin: Lín Qīngyuān; Jyutping: Lam4 Cing1 Jyun1; Pe̍h-ōe-jī: Lîm Chheng-ian), was a lawyer and legislative councillor (Jalan Lim Chin Guan, a street in George Town, Penang is named after her father). Her mother, Rosalind Hoalim, was British Guyanese. Lim was oldest of her siblings, who include Lim Kean Chye and former MP Lim Kean Siew.

== Career ==
Lim graduated from Convent Light Street in George Town, Penang. She was one of the first women from present-day Malaysia to receive a Master's of Law from Girton College, Cambridge.

In 1952, she acted as defence attorney for Lee Meng, a Communist guerrilla leader arrested in Perak, Malayan Union. In 1968, she defended eleven young people who had been sentenced to death for collaborating with Indonesian forces during the Indonesia–Malaysia confrontation. She secured pardons for all eleven defendants from the Sultan of Johor and the Sultan of Perak. In the 1960s, Lim was politically active as a member of the Labour Party of Malaya. She stood for election in the seat of Sentul in 1964 under the banner of the Socialist Front, but lost the seat to the Alliance Party.

The Malaysian Parliament was suspended in 1969 in the aftermath of the sectarian riots in the country. P. G. Lim was one of only two women to be appointed to the National Operations Council, which governed Malaysia from 1969 to 1971 in the aftermath of the riots. Members of the Council approved the Malaysian New Economic Policy in 1970, which was implemented in 1971.

In 1971, Malaysian Prime Minister Abdul Razak Hussein named Lim deputy permanent representative to the United Nations, a position which held the rank of Ambassador to the UN. Lim later continued her diplomatic career as the Malaysian Ambassador to Yugoslavia, Austria, and the European Economic Community.

== Extra work ==
She served as the Director of the Kuala Lumpur Regional Centre for Arbitration until her retirement in 2001. Lim was awarded the Merdeka Award in 2009.

== Death ==
Lim died in Perth, Western Australia, on 7 May 2013, at the age of 97. She was survived by two children, Wee Han Kim and Caryn Lim, and two grandchildren.

== Election results ==
Selangor State Legislative Assembly
Year	Constituency	Candidate	Votes	Pct	Opponent(s)	Votes	Pct	Ballots cast	Majority	Turnout
1964	S12 Sentul	P.G. Lim (LPM)	4,231	35.75%	Dr. P.T Arasu (MIC)	5,674	47,95%	11,834	1,443	66.27%
1964	S12 Sentul	P.G. Lim (LPM)	4,231	35.75%	K.V Thaver (PAP)	1,559	13.17%	11,834	1,443	66.27%

== Honour ==
- Malaysia
  - Commander of the Order of Loyalty to the Crown of Malaysia (P.S.M.) - Tan Sri (2011)
- Perak
  - Knight Commander of the Order of the Perak State Crown (D.P.M.P.) - Dato’ (1997)
- Penang
  - Companion of the Order of the Defender of State (D.M.P.N.) - Dato’ (1997)
