= Malaysia–Venezuela relations =

- Malaysia: Venezuela

Malaysia–Venezuela relations are foreign relations between Malaysia and Venezuela. Malaysia has had an embassy in Caracas since 1990, while Venezuela has an embassy in Kuala Lumpur. Diplomatic relations were established on 18 December 1986. Both countries are full members of the Group of 77.

== History ==
President Hugo Chávez first visited Malaysia in 1999, and visited again in August 2006 to discuss investments in Malaysia's palm oil industry and to diversify Venezuela's energy industry. Malaysia promised to support Venezuela's bid for a seat on the UN security council. During the trip, an agreement on avoiding double taxation was signed.

== Economic relations ==
Chávez proposed in December 2006 that Venezuela would build an oil refinery in Malaysia, and Golden Hope, a Malaysian state-owned palm oil company, agreed with the Venezuelan state oil company to cultivate 40,000 ha of oil palms in Venezuela, while Malaysian company Petronas would start oil exploration in Venezuela. Malaysia also agreed to help Venezuela with city planning.

A Malaysia-Venezuela Business Council was formed in July 2008, partly so that Venezuela could learn from Malaysian experience in poverty reduction. Bilateral trade was only US$6.6 million in 1990, when the countries signed a bilateral trade agreement, US$30.6 million in 1998, when Venezuela set up legal protections for foreign investments, US$19.8 million in 2004, US$39.6 million in 2005, and US$61.68 million in 2007, with only $250,000 being exports from Venezuela. The Venezuelan ambassador to Malaysia proposed in February 2009 that the two countries form a new financial institution for developing countries.

Malaysia held a "Venezuela Week" in July 2006, 2007, and 2008.

In 2020, during the COVID-19 pandemic, Venezuela's and Malaysia's trading ability was significantly hampered by the restrictions imposed by each country's government's response measures.

== Resident diplomatic missions ==
- Malaysia has an embassy in Caracas.
- Venezuela has an embassy in Kuala Lumpur.

== See also ==
- List of ambassadors of Malaysia to Venezuela
- Foreign relations of Malaysia
- Foreign relations of Venezuela
