= List of ambassadors of Peru to Malaysia =

Ambassador of Peru to Malaysia
- Great Seal of Peru
- Ministry of Foreign Affairs
- Appointer: The president of Peru
- Inaugural holder: Julio Balbuena
- Formation: 1990
- Website: Embassy of Peru in Malaysia

The extraordinary and plenipotentiary ambassador of Peru to Malaysia is the official representative of the Republic of Peru to Malaysia.

The ambassador in Kuala Lumpur is also accredited to neighbouring Cambodia and Brunei.

Both countries established diplomatic relations in the 1990s and have maintained them since. Peru maintains an embassy in Kuala Lumpur.

== List of representatives ==
Name	Term begin	Term end	President	Notes
Julio Balbuena	1990	1994	Alberto Fujimori	Accredited from Manila.
Jorge Bayona Medina	1994	1999	Alberto Fujimori	As ambassador, resident in Kuala Lumpur.
Javier Gonzales Terrones	1999	2004	Alberto Fujimori	As ambassador.
Alejandro Alfredo Gordillo Fernández	January 15, 2005	February 28, 2010	Alejandro Toledo	As ambassador; accredited to Brunei and Cambodia.
Marco Vinicio Balarezo Lizarzaburu	April 15, 2012	2015	Alan García	As ambassador; accredited to Cambodia.
Guido Felipe Loayza Devéscovi	November 16, 2015	2021	Ollanta Humala	As ambassador; accredited to Brunei.
Ricardo Morote Canales	January 1, 2021	2026	Francisco Sagasti	As ambassador; accredited to Brunei.

== See also ==
- List of ambassadors of Malaysia to Peru
- List of ambassadors of Peru to Singapore
