= Fiji–Malaysia relations =

- Fiji: Malaysia

Diplomatic mission
- Fijian High Commission, Kuala Lumpur: Malaysian High Commission, Suva

Envoy
- High Commissioner Kolinio Gata Takali: High Commissioner Ilham Tuah Illias

Fiji–Malaysia relations refers to bilateral foreign relations between Fiji and Malaysia. Fiji has a high commission in Kuala Lumpur, which is also accredited to Brunei, the Philippines and Singapore, and Malaysia has a high commission in Suva.

== History ==
Both countries were part of the British Empire and have long-standing relations due to many Fijian soldiers serving in Peninsular Malaysia during the Malayan Emergency from 1952 to 1956. In 1971, the first Prime Minister of Fiji, Ratu Sir Kamisese Mara, visited Malaysia then diplomatic relations were established in 1977. The Malaysian High Commission in Suva was established in 1984 while the Fijian High Commission in Kuala Lumpur been established in 1988.

== Economic and security relations ==
Fiji currently seeks technical assistance from Malaysia in the areas of agriculture, development of small medium enterprises, fisheries, forestry and to improving manufacturing base of Fiji. Fiji also seeks assistance on the renewable energy projects and infrastructural development. The country also considering marketing and promotion of Fiji products in Malaysia and the rest of Asia which is imperative on the tourism sector. There is also plan for a direct air link to Malaysia which would be benefits to boost to the Fijian tourism sector and both countries have a relations in military officers training, education, and air services. In 2011, a Fiji-Malaysia business council has been launched.

== See also ==
- Foreign relations of Fiji
- Foreign relations of Malaysia
