= Tengku Mohamad Rizam =

Tengku Temenggong of Kelantan (born 1961)

Tengku Mohamad Rizam تڠكو محمد رزام
- Tengku Temenggong of Kelantan
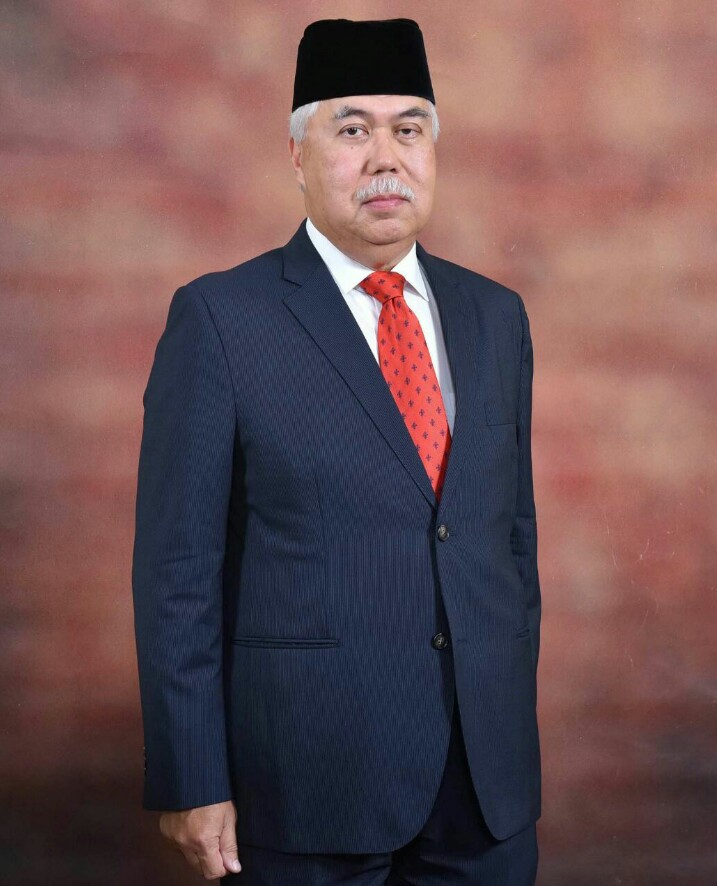
- Born: 18 July 1961 (age 65); Istana Kota Lama, Kota Bharu, Kelantan, Federation of Malaya (now Malaysia)
- Spouse: Tunku Puan Sri Dato' Hajah Noor Hayati binti Almarhum Tunku Abdul Rahman Putra Al-Haj (Tengku Puan Temenggong of Kelantan)
- Issue: Tengku Nur Qistina Petri; Tengku Abdul Rahman Petra; Tengku Yahya Aziz Petra
Names
- Tengku Mohamad Rizam bin Tengku Abdul Aziz
- House: Long Yunus
- Father: Tengku Abdul Aziz bin Almarhum Tengku Muhammad Hamzah
- Mother: Tengku Merjan binti Almarhum Sultan Yahya Petra
- Religion: Sunni Islam

Tengku Mohamad Rizam bin Tengku Abdul Aziz (born 18 July 1961) is a member of the Kelantan royal family who is the Tengku Temenggong of Kelantan. He is a cousin of the current Sultan of Kelantan, Sultan Muhammad V.

Tengku Mohamad Rizam is also the President of the Kelantan Islamic Religious and Malay Customs Council (MAIK).

== Early life and education ==
Tengku Mohamad Rizam was born at Istana Kota Lama in Kota Bharu, Kelantan on 18 July 1961. He is the eldest of four siblings to Tengku Sri Utama Raja Tengku Abdul Aziz bin Almarhum Tengku Muhammad Hamzah and Tengku Puan Sri Utama Raja Tengku Merjan binti Almarhum Sultan Yahya Petra. His father was Malaysia's Ambassador to Saudi Arabia from 1975 to 1978 and to the Netherlands from 1978 to 1982. Tengku Mohamad Rizam's paternal grandfather was Tengku Sri Maharaja Tengku Muhammad Hamzah bin Almarhum Tengku Zainal Abidin, the 12th Menteri Besar of Kelantan. His maternal grandfather was Sultan Yahya Petra ibni Almarhum Sultan Ibrahim, the 27th Sultan of Kelantan and the 6th Yang di-Pertuan Agong of Malaysia.

Tengku Mohamad Rizam began his early education at Sekolah Kebangsaan Sultan Ismail (I) in Kota Bharu, Kelantan. He continued his studies at Sekolah Menengah Sultan Ismail in Kota Bharu, Kelantan and Sekolah Menengah Kebangsaan St. John in Kuala Lumpur. He then studied A-Level at Cheltenham College, England. He graduated from the Ohio University, Athens, Ohio, United States with a Bachelor of Business Administration (Hons) Major in Marketing and obtained a Master of Business Administration (MBA) from the United States International University, San Diego, California, United States.

== Career ==
Tengku Mohamad Rizam began his banking career in 1986 at MUI Bank Berhad (now known as Hong Leong Bank), where he held various roles in the Business Development & Marketing Division, culminating in his position as Manager. He later served in senior roles at Malaysian French Bank Berhad (now known as Alliance Bank), Bank Utama (M’sia) Berhad (now known as RHB Bank), and RHB Islamic Bank Berhad.

Notably, Tengku Mohamad Rizam was the Deputy Regional Director (Central) at RHB Bank Berhad, where he supported the Regional Director in managing and maximising returns of the Group’s retail franchise in the Central Region, contributing significantly to the bank's retail revenue. He also led the Technology Banking Division, overseeing the management and marketing of Internet banking and cash management products. He retired in 2014 as Head, Transaction Banking and Senior Vice President of RHB Islamic Bank.

Tengku Mohamad Rizam was appointed as the Chairman of the Kelantan State Service Commission (SPN) on 6 September 2014 and as the President of the Kelantan Islamic Religious and Malay Customs Council (MAIK) on 19 March 2019. He also served as the Commander of the 506 Territorial Army Regiment from 2 August 2012 to 1 August 2021 and held the rank of Brigadier General.

== Appointment history ==
Tengku Mohamad Rizam was appointed as Tengku Sri Jaya Raja of Kelantan in 1999 followed by Tengku Panglima Raja of Kelantan in 2010 and then appointed as Tengku Temenggong of Kelantan on 25 November 2013. He is also a member of State Royal Succession Council of Kelantan (Malay: Ahli Majlis Perajaan Negeri Kelantan).

== Personal life ==
On 18 July 1991, Tengku Mohamad Rizam married Tunku Noor Hayati, the daughter of the first Prime Minister of Malaysia, Tunku Abdul Rahman Putra.

They have two sons and a daughter named Tengku Nur Qistina Petri, Tengku Abdul Rahman Petra and Tengku Yahya Aziz Petra.

== Styles and honours ==
Styles of Tengku Mohamad Rizam
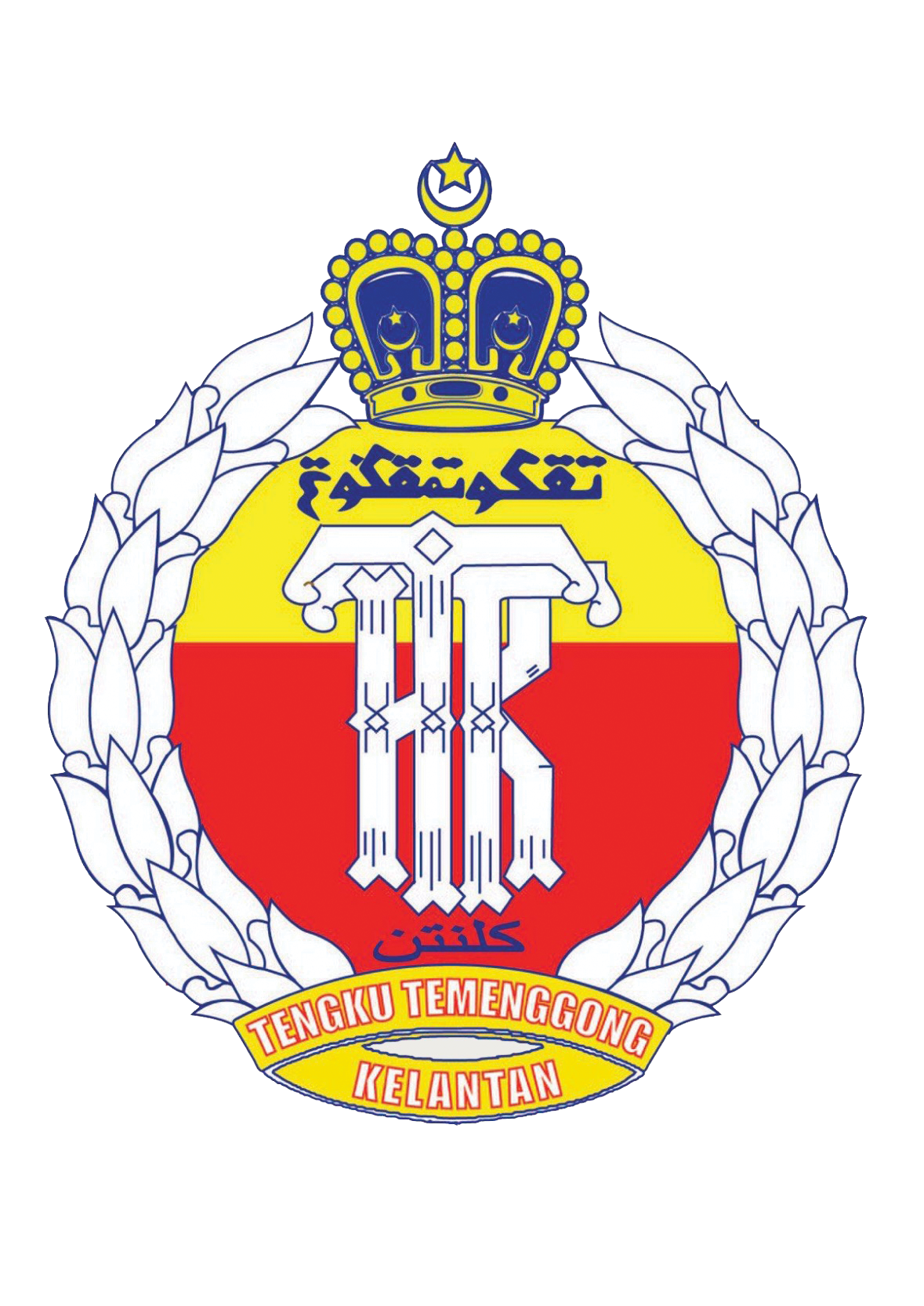
- Reference style: His Noble Honour
- Spoken style: Tengku
- Alternative style: Tengku Temenggong

He has been awarded:

- Kelantan
  - Recipient of the Royal Family Order of Kelantan (DK) (2017)
  - Knight Grand Commander of the Order of the Crown of Kelantan (SPMK) – Dato' (2010)
  - Knight Grand Commander of the Order of the Life of the Crown of Kelantan (SJMK) – Dato' (1999)
  - Recipient of the Sultan Ismail Petra Silver Jubilee Medal (2004)
  - Recipient of the Sultan Muhammad V Proclamation Medal (2010)
- Malaysia
  - Commander of the Order of Loyalty to the Crown of Malaysia (PSM) – Tan Sri (2017)
  - Recipient of the Loyal Service Medal (PPS)
  - Recipient of the General Service Medal (PPA)
  - Recipient of the 15th Yang di-Pertuan Agong Installation Medal
- Malaysian Armed Forces
  - Warrior of the Most Gallant Order of Military Service (PAT)

His wife Tunku Noor Hayati, Tengku Puan Temenggong of Kelantan has been awarded:

- Kelantan
  - Knight Commander of the Order of the Life of the Crown of Kelantan (DJMK) - Dato' (2012)
