= Malaysia–Thailand relations =

- Malaysia: Thailand

Diplomatic mission
- Embassy of Malaysia, Bangkok: Royal Thai Embassy, Kuala Lumpur

Envoy
- Ambassador Jojie Samuel: Ambassador Lada Phumas

Malaysia–Thailand relations refer to bilateral foreign relations between the two neighbouring countries, Malaysia and Thailand. Thailand has an embassy in Kuala Lumpur, and consulate-general offices in George Town and Kota Bharu. Malaysia maintains an embassy in Bangkok and a consulate-general in Songkhla. During Mahathir Mohamad's second term as the Prime Minister of Malaysia from 2018 to 2020, he made four visits to Thailand. Historical and ethnocultural ties between the two countries and their predecessor states date back many centuries, and relations are generally cordial.

Malaysia and Thailand usually co-operate in areas such as trade and investment, security and defence, education and vocational training, youth and sports, tourism, connectivity and socio-economic development in border areas. Due to the ethnically-Malay Pattani separatists in three southern provinces of Thailand, previously there have been blatant claims by certain politicians in Thailand that some parties in Malaysia have taken an interest in the cause of their opponents in the war, which is vehemently refuted by the latter government as Malaysia has since been assisting in peace talks between the Thai government and separatists. Malaysia has no territorial claims on Southern Thailand and has consistently refused to support separatist aspirations by the local ethnic Malays, maintaining that the territory is an integral part of Thailand.

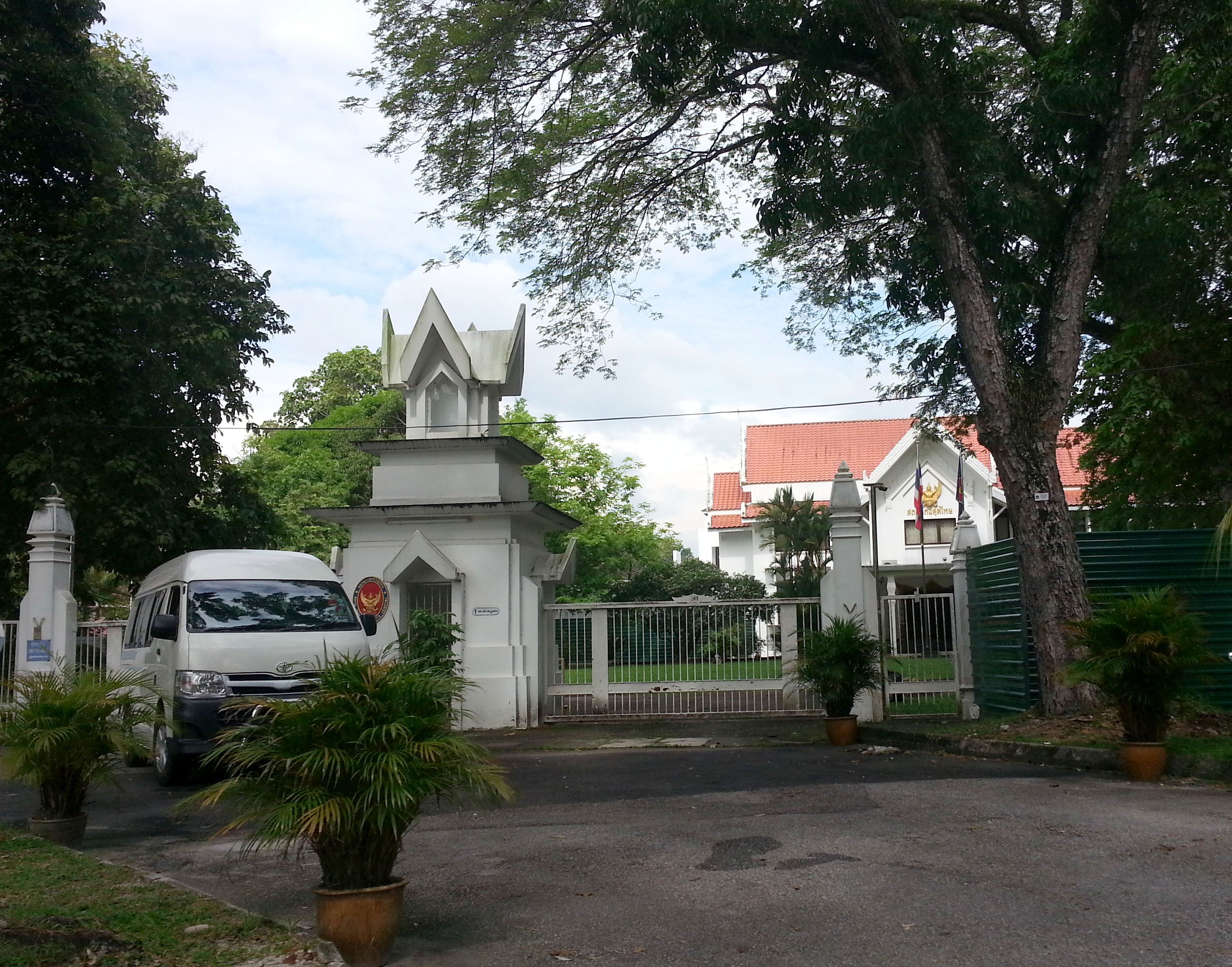
Royal Thai Consulate-General in George Town, Penang, Malaysia.

== History ==
=== Chinese protection of Malays against Siam ===
The Sultanate of Malacca voluntarily became a protectorate and tributary state to Ming dynasty China, which protected Malacca against its enemies with military force, allowing the Muslim Sultanate to prosper. The Chinese warded off Siam and Majapahit from conquering Malacca, and also engaged in war against Portugal during the Battle of Shancaowan for conquering Malacca.

At the foundation of Malacca, the native peoples were the peoples with Hinduism and Buddhism influence. According to the annals record, at the time Parameswara founded Malacca, the country was often attacked by the old enemies Majapahit and the rivals from northern area of Malacca, Ayutthaya Kingdom. Malacca was able to hold position and fight back the enemies. Parameswara decided to send his ambassador to visit the Emperor of China, one of the superpowers of the period, the Emperor of the Ming Dynasty, and both agreed to become allies. Ever since the agreement between Malacca Empire and China Empire, the Thai Ayutthaya Kingdom and Majapahit Empire never intended to attack Malacca. Later, some records suggested that during the trade activities and arrival of the Chinese-Muslim admiral "Cheng Ho" or Zheng He, Parameswara converted to Islam and adopted an Islamic name, Sultan Iskandar Shah. The new religion spread quickly throughout his conversion and the voyage of Zheng He.

Ming dynasty China warned Thailand and the Majapahit against trying to conquer and attack the Malacca sultanate, placing the Malacca Sultanate under Chinese protection as a protectorate, and giving the ruler of Malacca the title of King. The Chinese strengthened several warehouses in Malacca. The Muslim Sultanate flourished due to the Chinese protection against the Thai and other powers who wanted to attack Malacca. Siam was also a tributary to China and had to obey China's orders not to attack.

=== Japanese invasion during World War Two ===
Imperial Japan invaded Thailand in December 1941 and within a few hours, the country signed a cease fire and formed an alliance with Japan. A campaign against Malaya and Singapore then commenced, in which Thailand helped the Japanese conduct strikes against them and provided a path for the Japanese invasion force. In return, the Japanese gave Thailand control and administration of the four northern Malayan states in October 1943. These states would be returned to the British after the war ended.

=== Mahathir Mohamad administration (1981–2003) ===
On 5 July 2002, Malaysian Prime Minister Mahathir Mohamad arrived in Chiang Mai to begin a two-day official visit to Thailand.

== Economic relations ==
Bilateral trade between Malaysia and Thailand has an upward trend. The 2011 trade value was at US$22.95 billion. In 2015, both Bank Negara Malaysia (BNM) and Bank of Thailand (BOT) agreed to promote the greater use of their currencies to settle trade between the two countries. In 2016, the combined total trade was US$20 billion, with border trade accounted for over 60% of the figure. In March 2017, both countries are determined to see bilateral trade achieve US$30 billion by the following year. The Thai side had submitted several proposals to boost border trade to achieve the U$30 billion target, such as proposing 24-hours or longer custom operation hours at the border to facilitate movement of goods and the improvement of facilities especially in transportation and logistic infrastructure at the border to further improve trade, while Thailand has also been supporting the Malaysian-based proposal for better port connectivity. In September 2017, the Kuala Lumpur Business Club (KLBC) made a business mission to Bangkok to strengthen further business relations and economic co-operation. The delegation also seeking for more investments from Thailand. There is also a Malaysian Thai Business Chamber of Commerce to facilitate trade between the two countries. In December 2017, both countries and Indonesia agreed on a framework where trade between the three countries can be settled in local currencies instead of the US dollar.

In 2019, Thailand Ambassador to Malaysia Narong Sasitorn are looking to enhance its investment in Sabah, particularly in the medical tourism sector and niche tourism packages while at the same time announcing their country interest to be part of the Brunei, Indonesia, Malaysia and Philippines–East Asia Growth Area (BIMP-EAGA) through Kota Kinabalu with the development of port and terminal facilities in the city, the Pan Borneo Highway and diversification of industrial base. As a response, Sabah Chief Minister Shafie Apdal said they looking forward to welcoming more investors from Thailand in light of the emergence of numerous industries and business sectors in Sabah where further partnerships with Thailand can be developed. Sabah's neighbour of Sarawak also considering to set up a trade office in Bangkok if there is increasing trade volume between Sarawak and Thailand over the next couple of years. The Thai government through its Deputy Prime Minister and Commerce Minister Jurin Laksanawisit said that Thailand is looking to double the number of immigration personnel within the Sadao District border to 100 as well as widen existing roads to six lanes from only four in 2019 as existing checkpoints were said to have been plagued by customs bottlenecks, blocking the entry of goods and tourists as part of their plan to boost trade relations with Malaysia.

== Security relations ==
Both countries participate in the Cooperation Afloat Readiness and Training (CARAT) annually together with other ASEAN countries such as Bangladesh, Brunei, Cambodia, Indonesia, the Philippines and Singapore. Both Malaysia and Thailand also announce a plan to replace their border fence into a wall border according to Thai Defence Minister Prawit Wongsuwan who got the idea from a recent meeting in Laos with Malaysian counterparts.

== See also ==
- Bunga mas
- Malaysia–Thailand border
- Malaysian Siamese
- Thai Malays
