= List of ambassadors of Malaysia to Mexico =

Ambassador of Malaysia to Mexico
- Incumbent; Jamal Sharifuddin Johan since 2023
- Style: His Excellency
- Seat: Mexico City, Mexico
- Appointer: Yang di-Pertuan Agong
- Inaugural holder: Yeop Adlan Che Rose
- Formation: 28 July 1992
- Website: www.kln.gov.my/web/mex_mexico-city/home

The ambassador of Malaysia to the United Mexican States is the head of Malaysia's diplomatic mission to Mexico. The position has the rank and status of an ambassador extraordinary and plenipotentiary and is based in the Embassy of Malaysia, Mexico City.

== List of heads of mission ==
=== Ambassadors to Mexico ===
| Ambassador | Term start | Term end |
|---|---|---|
| Yeop Adlan Che Rose | 28 July 1992 | 27 March 1995 |
| John Tenewi Nuek | 16 September 1995 | 16 January 1998 |
| Tengku Idriss Tengku Ibrahim | 16 April 1998 | 21 January 2002 |
| Mohammed Ab. Halim Ab. Rahman | 28 February 2002 | 30 June 2005 |
| Shamsudin Abdullah | 3 July 2005 | 2 July 2007 |
| Nafisah Mohamed | 28 August 2008 | 24 January 2011 |
| Jamaiyah Mohamed Yusof | 9 May 2011 | 23 March 2015 |
| Mohammad Azhar Mazlan | 9 July 2015 | 11 February 2018 |
| Muzafar Shah Mustafa | 6 July 2018 | 10 October 2023 |
| Jamal Sharifuddin Johan | 11 October 2023 | Incumbent |

== See also ==
- Malaysia–Mexico relations
