= Algeria–Malaysia relations =

- Algeria: Malaysia

Diplomatic mission
- Algerian Embassy, Kuala Lumpur: Malaysian Embassy, Algiers

Envoy
- Ambassador: Ambassador

Algeria–Malaysia relations are the bilateral relations between Algeria and Malaysia. Algeria has an embassy in Kuala Lumpur, and Malaysia has an embassy in Algiers. Both countries are members of the Organisation of Islamic Cooperation and Non-Aligned Movement.

== History ==
The Algerian embassy in Malaysia was opened in 1993 with the Algerian President Abdelaziz Bouteflika visiting Malaysia twice in 2003, for the NAM and OIC Summits. Malaysian Prime Minister Mahathir Mohamad reciprocated the visit in the same year, during which several agreements were signed concerning bilateral trade, information and communication technology as well as co-operation between the Algeria Press Service and Bernama news agency.

== Economic relations ==
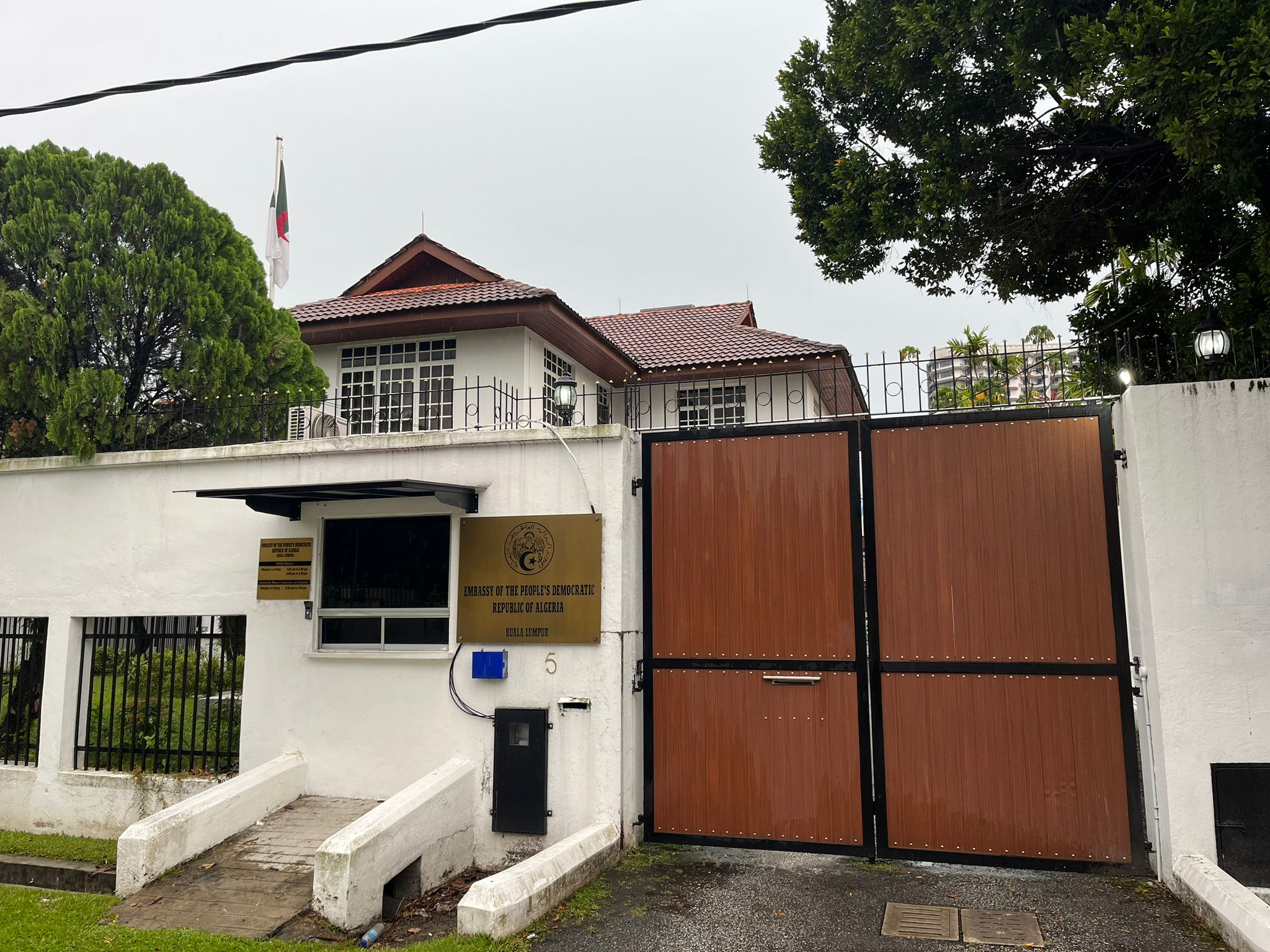
Embassy of Algeria in Kuala Lumpur

In 2002, Algeria's exports to Malaysia were worth around $2.5 million, while Malaysia's exports to Algeria reached $113.6 million. Malaysian investors are encouraged by the Algerian government to invest as the country is undergoing rapid infrastructure and industrial development. Algeria also invited Malaysian firms for development and one of the main Malaysian oil companies, Petronas, for an oil exploration project. Algeria's main exports to Malaysia include crude fertiliser and minerals, chemicals and chemical products while Malaysia's main exports to Algeria are palm oil, chemicals, chemical products, vegetable oil, wooden products, textiles and clothing.
