= List of ambassadors of Malaysia to Argentina =

Ambassador of Malaysia to Argentina
- Style: His Excellency
- Seat: Buenos Aires, Argentina
- Appointer: Yang di-Pertuan Agong
- Inaugural holder: Khor Eng Hee
- Formation: 1989
- Website: www.kln.gov.my/web/arg_buenos-aires/home

The ambassador of Malaysia to the Argentine Republic is the head of Malaysia's diplomatic mission to Argentina. The position has the rank and status of an ambassador extraordinary and plenipotentiary and is based in the Embassy of Malaysia, Buenos Aires.

== List of heads of mission ==
=== Ambassadors to Argentina ===
Ambassador	Term start	Term end
Khor Eng Hee	1989	1992
Marzuki Mohammad Noor	1992	1996
Dennis J. Ignatius	1996	1999
M. Santhananaban	1999	2003
Mohd Roze Abdul Rahman	2003	2005
Rohana Ramli	2005	2008
Zulkifli Yaacob	2008	2013
Mohd Ashri Muda	2014	January 2017
Mohd Khalid Abbasi Abdul Razak	21 March 2017	2020
Nur Azman Abdul Rahim	2021	2021
Vacant	2022	2023

== See also ==
- Argentina–Malaysia relations
