= List of ambassadors of Malaysia to Bosnia and Herzegovina =

Ambassador of Malaysia to Bosnia and Herzegovina
- Incumbent; Raja Saifful Ridzuwan Raja Kamaruddin since 2020
- Style: His Excellency
- Seat: Sarajevo, Bosnia and Herzegovina
- Appointer: Yang di-Pertuan Agong
- Inaugural holder: Rastam Mohd Isa
- Formation: 1996
- Website: www.kln.gov.my/web/bih_sarajevo/home

The ambassador of Malaysia to Bosnia and Herzegovina is the head of Malaysia's diplomatic mission to Bosnia and Herzegovina. The position has the rank and status of an ambassador extraordinary and plenipotentiary and is based in the Embassy of Malaysia, Sarajevo.

== List of heads of mission ==
=== Ambassadors to Bosnia and Herzegovina ===
Ambassador	Term start	Term end
Rastam Mohd Isa	1996	1998
Hussin Nayan	1998	2000
Zakaria Sulong	2000	2004
Ramlan Ibrahim	2004	2006
Adnan Zulkifli	2008	2011
Anuar Kasman	2013	2017
Zakri Jaafar	2017	2020
Raja Saifful Ridzuwan Raja Kamaruddin	2021	incumbent

== See also ==
- Bosnia and Herzegovina–Malaysia relations
