= List of ambassadors of Malaysia to Germany =

Ambassador of Malaysia to Germany
- Incumbent; Sarah Nava Rani Al Bakri Devadason since 2017
- Style: His Excellency
- Seat: Berlin, Germany
- Appointer: Yang di-Pertuan Agong
- Inaugural holder: Senu Abdul Rahman
- Formation: August 1962
- Website: www.kln.gov.my/web/deu_berlin/home

The ambassador of Malaysia to the Federal Republic of Germany is the head of Malaysia's diplomatic mission to Germany. The position has the rank and status of an ambassador extraordinary and plenipotentiary and is based in the Embassy of Malaysia, Berlin.

== List of heads of mission ==
=== Ambassadors to Germany ===
Ambassador	Term start	Term end
Senu Abdul Rahman	August 1962	November 1963
Abdul Hamid Jumat	February 1964	December 1965
Abdul Khalid Awang Osman	January 1966	October 1971
Philip Kuok Hock Khee	November 1971	December 1974
Abdullah Ali	March 1975	September 1975
Ismail Mohamed	December 1975	October 1978
Kamaruddin Ariff	December 1978	August 1981
Ali Abdullah	September 1981	November 1983
Albert S. Talalla	December 1983	March 1986
Abdul Majid Mohamed	May 1986	May 1988
Zainal Abidin Ibrahim	June 1988	May 1992
Ajit Singh	July 1992	November 1992
Mohd Amir Jaafar	January 1993	August 1995
Zainuddin Abd Rahman	October 1995	December 1998
Abdul Kadir Deen	April 1999	April 2003
Kamal Ismaun	June 2003	June 2007
Zakaria Sulong	September 2007	April 2010
Ibrahim Abdullah	June 2010	August 2013
Salman Ahmad	October 2013	February 2015
Zulkifli Adnan	May 2015	October 2017
Sarah Nava Rani Al Bakri Devadason	2017 -2020 Adina binti Kamarudin || 2023 - Incumbent	

== See also ==
- Germany–Malaysia relations
