= List of ambassadors of Malaysia to Kuwait =

Ambassador of Malaysia to Kuwait
- Incumbent; Mohammad Ali Selamat since 15 August 2018
- Style: His Excellency
- Seat: Kuwait City, Kuwait
- Appointer: Yang di-Pertuan Agong
- Inaugural holder: Jamaluddin Abu Bakar
- Formation: 8 September 1974
- Website: www.kln.gov.my/web/kwt_kuwait/home

The ambassador of Malaysia to the State of Kuwait is the head of Malaysia's diplomatic mission to Kuwait. The position has the rank and status of an ambassador extraordinary and plenipotentiary and is based in the Embassy of Malaysia, Kuwait City.

== List of heads of mission ==
=== Ambassadors to Kuwait ===
Ambassador	Term start	Term end
Jamaluddin Abu Bakar	8 September 1974	1 June 1978
Ismail Ambia	31 July 1978	27 July 1981
Khatib Abdul Hamid	13 August 1981	4 April 1985
Zainal Abidin Alias	3 September 1985	27 July 1989
Wan Hussein Mustapha	6 September 1989	2 December 1992
Dzulkifli Abd. Rahman	5 January 1993	30 June 1997
Ismail Mustapha	8 September 1997	10 February 2003
Husni Zai Yaacob	21 March 2003	14 October 2005
Ashaary Sani	2 January 2006	17 April 2011
Adnan Othman	21 August 2011	14 February 2015
Ahmad Rozian Abd. Ghani	19 April 2015	27 March 2018
Mohammad Ali Selamat	15 August 2018	Incumbent

== See also ==
- Kuwait–Malaysia relations
