= List of high commissioners of Malaysia to Namibia =

Acting High Commissioner of Malaysia to Namibia
- Incumbent; Dato’ Dr. Mohamad Rameez Yahaya since 2023
- Style: His Excellency
- Seat: Windhoek, Namibia
- Appointer: Yang di-Pertuan Agong
- Inaugural holder: Mohd Roze Abdul Rahman
- Formation: 1996
- Website: www.kln.gov.my/web/nam_windhoek/home

The high commissioner of Malaysia to the Republic of Namibia is the head of Malaysia's diplomatic mission to Namibia. The position has the rank and status of an ambassador extraordinary and plenipotentiary and is based in the High Commission of Malaysia, Windhoek.

== List of heads of mission ==
=== High commissioners to Namibia ===
High Commissioner	Term start	Term end
Mohd Roze Abdul Rahman	1996	2000
Ramanathan Vengadesan	2000	2004
Hayati Ismail	2004	2009
Mohd. Yusof Bakar	2009	2010
Hishamuddin Ibrahim	2016	2023

== See also ==
- Malaysia–Namibia relations
