= List of ambassadors of Malaysia to Romania =

Ambassador of Malaysia to Romania
- Incumbent; Abdullah Zawawi Tahir since 18 July 2019
- Style: His Excellency
- Seat: Bucharest, Romania
- Appointer: Yang di-Pertuan Agong
- Inaugural holder: Halimah Abdullah
- Formation: 18 January 2006
- Website: www.kln.gov.my/web/rou_bucharest/home

The ambassador of Malaysia to Romania is the head of Malaysia's diplomatic mission to Romania. The position has the rank and status of an ambassador extraordinary and plenipotentiary and is based in the Embassy of Malaysia, Bucharest.

== List of heads of mission ==
=== Ambassadors to Romania ===
Ambassador	Term start	Term end
Halimah Abdullah	18 January 2006	14 June 2011
Nik Mustafa Kamal Nik Ahmad	25 July 2012	15 June 2015
Tajul Aman Mohammad	28 January 2016	28 December 2018
Abdullah Zawawi Tahir	2 August 2019	27 November 2020
Tengku Sirajuzzaman Tengku Mohamed Ariffin	28 August 2021	22 August 2024
Vacant	22 August 2024	

== See also ==
- Malaysia–Romania relations
