= List of ambassadors of Malaysia to Jordan =

Ambassador of Malaysia to Jordan
- Incumbent; Mohd. Zainuddin Jilid Kuminding since 2017
- Style: His Excellency
- Seat: Amman, Jordan
- Appointer: Yang di-Pertuan Agong
- Inaugural holder: Ramli Naam as Chargé d'Affaires
- Formation: 1996
- Website: www.kln.gov.my/web/jor_amman/home

The ambassador of Malaysia to the Hashemite Kingdom of Jordan is the head of Malaysia's diplomatic mission to Jordan. The position has the rank and status of an ambassador extraordinary and plenipotentiary and is based in the Embassy of Malaysia, Amman.

== List of heads of mission ==
=== Chargés d'Affaires to Jordan ===
Chargé d'Affaires	Term start	Term end
Ramli Naam	1995	1998
Ku Jaafar Ku Shaari	1998	2001

=== Ambassadors to Jordan ===
Ambassador	Term start	Term end
Abdul Jalil Haron	2000	2003
Syeed Sultan Seeni Pakir	2003	2005
Hasnudin Hamzah	2006	2008
Abdul Malek Abdul Aziz	2008	2014
Zakri Jaafar	2014	2017
Mohd. Zainuddin Jilid Kuminding	2017	Incumbent

== See also ==
- Jordan–Malaysia relations
