= List of high commissioners of Malaysia to South Africa =

High Commissioner of Malaysia to South Africa
- Incumbent; Mohamad Nizan Mohamad since 2018
- Style: His Excellency
- Seat: Pretoria, South Africa
- Appointer: Yang di-Pertuan Agong
- Inaugural holder: Choo Eng Guan
- Formation: 13 September 1992
- Website: www.kln.gov.my/web/zaf_pretoria/home

The high commissioner of Malaysia to the Republic of South Africa is the head of Malaysia's diplomatic mission to South Africa. The position has the rank and status of an ambassador extraordinary and plenipotentiary and is based in the High Commission of Malaysia, Pretoria.

== List of heads of mission ==
=== High commissioners to South Africa ===
High Commissioner	Term start	Term end
Choo Eng Guan	13 September 1992	23 December 1996
Abdul Kadir Mohamad Deen	10 January 1997	19 February 1999
Zainal Azman Zainal Abidin	26 March 1999	4 May 2004
Yahaya Abdul Jabar	11 August 2004	10 November 2008
Kennedy Jawan	17 December 2008	31 December 2013
Mat Dris Yaacob		
Mohamad Nizan Mohamad	2018	2023
Rus Shazila Osman	1 November 2023	Incumbent

== See also ==
- Malaysia–South Africa relations
