= List of ambassadors of Malaysia to Chile =

Ambassador of Malaysia to Chile
- Incumbent; Vacant since July 2018
- Style: His Excellency
- Seat: Santiago, Chile
- Appointer: Yang di-Pertuan Agong
- Inaugural holder: Iskandar Sarudin
- Formation: 2 December 1991
- Website: www.kln.gov.my/web/chl_santiago/home

The ambassador of Malaysia to the Republic of Chile is the head of Malaysia's diplomatic mission to Chile. The position has the rank and status of an ambassador extraordinary and plenipotentiary and is based in the Embassy of Malaysia, Santiago.

== List of heads of mission ==
=== Chargés d'Affaires to Chile ===
Chargé d'Affaires	Term start	Term end
Iskandar Sarudin	2 December 1991	

=== Ambassadors to Chile ===
Ambassador	Term start	Term end
Dennis J. Ignatius	26 March 1992	
Lily Zachariah	18 December 1996	
Arumugam Ganapathy	29 August 2000	
Abdullah Faiz Zain	13 February 2006	
Ganeson Sivagurunathan	12 September 2011	
Mohamad Rameez Yahaya	4 October 2015	2018

== See also ==
- Chile–Malaysia relations
