= List of ambassadors of Peru to Singapore =

Ambassador of Peru to the Republic of Singapore
- Great Seal of Peru
- Ministry of Foreign Affairs
- Appointer: The president of Peru
- Formation: after 1988
- Website: Embassy of Peru in Singapore

The extraordinary and plenipotentiary ambassador of Peru to the Republic of Singapore is the official representative of the Republic of Peru to the Republic of Singapore.

Both countries established relations in 1980 and have maintained them since. The ambassador in Singapore has also been accredited to Brunei until said country's representation was changed to Malaysia.

== List of representatives ==
Name	Portrait	Term begin	Term end	President	Notes
Sergio Kostritsky Pereira		1994	1998	Alberto Fujimori	As ambassador; accredited to Brunei, and thus, said country's first ambassador.
Juan Carlos Capuñay Chávez		1998	2002	Alberto Fujimori	As ambassador; accredited to Brunei.
Fernando Guillén Salas		2002	2004	Alejandro Toledo	As ambassador.
José Mariano Arturo Montoya Stuva		November 15, 2004	2009	Alejandro Toledo	As ambassador.
Armando Raúl Patiño Alvistur		2010	2013	Alan García	As ambassadors.
Manuel Gerardo Talavera Espinar		July 1, 2013	2018	Ollanta Humala	As ambassador.
Carlos Raúl Vásquez Corrales		October 1, 2018	2026	Martín Vizcarra	As ambassador.

== See also ==
- List of ambassadors of Peru to Malaysia
