= Gloria Corina Peter Tiwet =

Malaysian diplomat, from 2018 High Commissioner to Nigeria

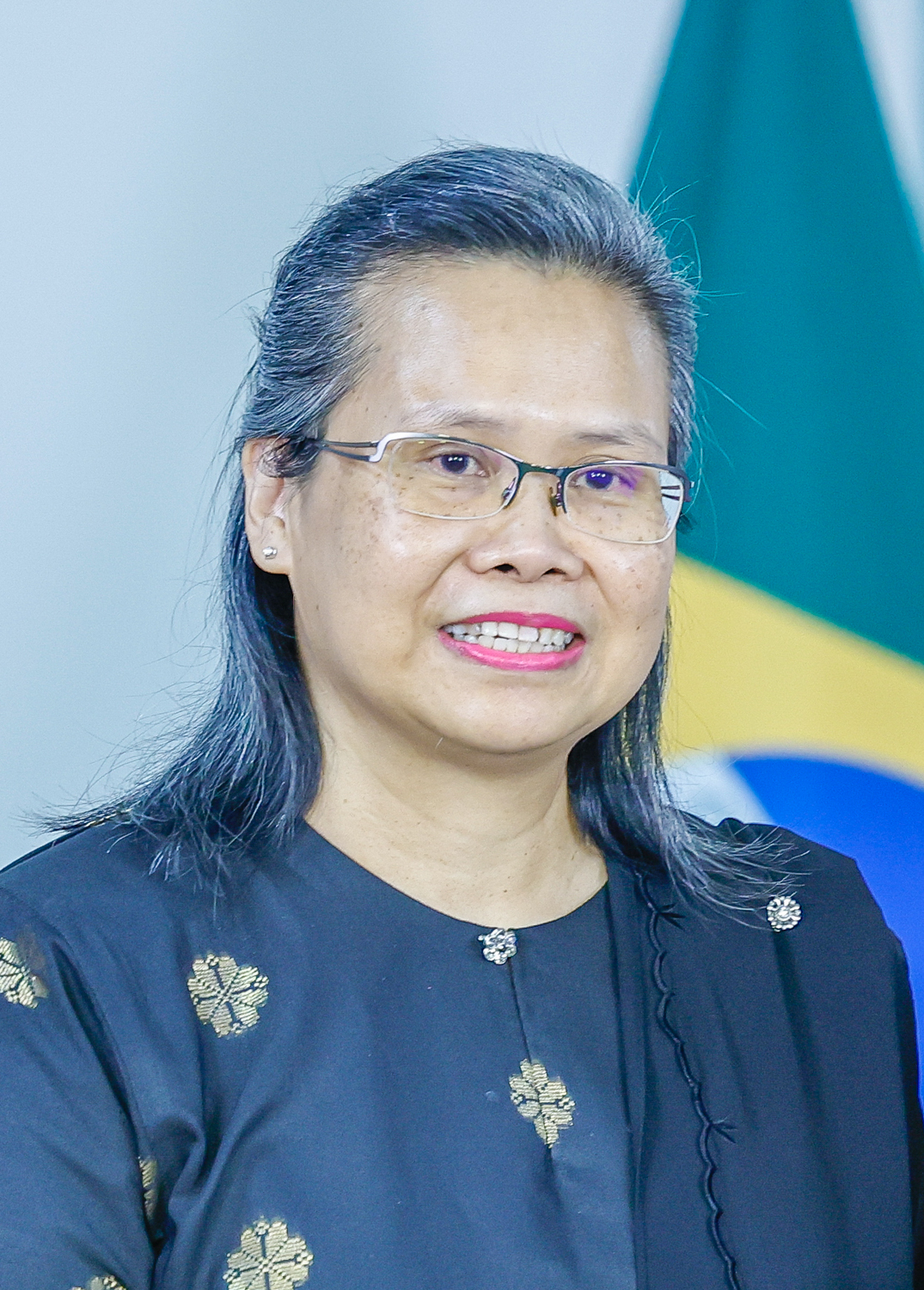
Tiwat in May 2023

Gloria Corina Peter Tiwet, Malaysia's High Commissioner to Nigeria, is "the first Sarawakian woman from the Dayak ethnic group to be appointed as a Malaysian High Commissioner".

Tiwet is concurrently accredited to Benin, Cameroon, Chad, the Central African Republic, Equatorial Guinea and Gabon. She began on 4 April 2018 and presented her letter of credence to Nigerian president Muhammadu Buhari on 12 September 2018.

Tiwat is the second Bidayuh to be appointed high commissioner/ambassador after Datuk John Tenewi Nuek.
