= List of ambassadors of Malaysia to Morocco =

Ambassador of Malaysia to Morocco
- Incumbent; Astanah Banu Shri Abdul Aziz since 2017
- Style: His Excellency
- Seat: Rabat, Morocco
- Appointer: Yang di-Pertuan Agong
- Inaugural holder: Bakri Ayub Ghazali
- Formation: 10 August 1989
- Website: www.kln.gov.my/web/mar_rabat/home

The ambassador of Malaysia to the Kingdom of Morocco is the head of Malaysia's diplomatic mission to Morocco. The position has the rank and status of an ambassador extraordinary and plenipotentiary and is based in the Embassy of Malaysia, Rabat.

== List of heads of mission ==
=== Ambassadors to Morocco ===
Ambassador	Term start	Term end
Bakri Ayub Ghazali	10 August 1989	5 October 1992
K. Nadarajah Nagalingam	19 February 1992	22 September 1993
Yusof Hashim	26 September 1994	10 July 1996
Idris Zainuddin	12 December 1996	29 June 1999
Siddiq Firdause Mohd Ali	9 August 2000	2 August 2001
Mohd Nor Atan	1 February 2002	30 November 2005
Othman Samin	2007	2010
Jamal Hassan	8 July 2011	2 September 2017
Astanah Banu Shri Abdul Aziz	2017	Incumbent

== See also ==
- Malaysia–Morocco relations
