= List of ambassadors of Malaysia to Algeria =

Ambassador of Malaysia to Algeria
- Incumbent; Vacant
- Style: His Excellency
- Seat: Algiers, Algeria
- Appointer: Yang di-Pertuan Agong
- Inaugural holder: Ramli Naam
- Formation: April 2001
- Website: www.kln.gov.my/web/dza_algiers/home

The ambassador of Malaysia to the People's Democratic Republic of Algeria is the head of Malaysia's diplomatic mission to Algeria. The position has the rank and status of an ambassador extraordinary and plenipotentiary and is based in the Embassy of Malaysia, Algiers.

== List of heads of mission ==
=== Ambassadors to Algeria ===
Ambassador	Term start	Term end
Badruddin Ab. Rahman	March 2005	October 2008
Ramli Naam	April 2001	January 2005
Hasrul Sani Mujtabar	April 2009	July 2012
Mohd Tarid Sufian	7 April 2014	August 2019
Mohd Faizal Razali	15 September 2021	Sep 2024
Rizany Irwan Muhamad Mazlan	21 October 2024	incumbent

== See also ==
- Algeria–Malaysia relations
