= List of high commissioners of Malaysia to Ghana =

High Commissioner of Malaysia to Ghana
- Incumbent; Vacant
- Style: His Excellency
- Seat: Accra, Ghana
- Appointer: Yang di-Pertuan Agong
- Inaugural holder: Kamarudin Mustafa
- Formation: 1 January 1999
- Website: www.kln.gov.my/web/gha_accra/home

The high commissioner of Malaysia to the Republic of Ghana is the head of Malaysia's diplomatic mission to Ghana. The position has the rank and status of an ambassador extraordinary and plenipotentiary and is based in the High Commission of Malaysia, Accra.

== List of heads of mission ==
=== High commissioners to Ghana ===
High Commissioner	Term start	Term end
Kamarudin Mustafa	3 January 1999	1 November 2002
Muhammad Alias	3 November 2002	August 2005
Mahalil Baharam	23 August 2005	21 April 2008
Razinah Ghazali	21 August 2008	3 February 2011
Cheong Loon Lai	16 April 2014	5 April 2017

== See also ==
- Ghana–Malaysia relations
