= Malaysia–Peru relations =

- Malaysia: Peru

Malaysia–Peru relations refers to bilateral relations between Malaysia and Peru. Malaysia has an embassy in Lima, which was established in 1996, while Peru has an embassy in Kuala Lumpur, which was established in 1992. The countries desire to improve their relations in tourism, trade and investment, agriculture and forestry, health, science and technology, energy, education, rural development, poverty alleviation, gastronomy, and art and culture.

On 11 October 1995, Malaysian Prime Minister Mahathir Mohamad left for an official visit to Peru. Mahathir said both countries should strive for tangible economic cooperation, stronger trade ties and a deeper level of political and cultural relations.

== Trade ==
Malaysia is one of the main destination for Peruvian exports with the total trade in 2012 records $235 million. Peruvian exports to Malaysia total around $28 million while Malaysian exports with $207 million.

== Agreements ==
In 1995, an agreement on mutual promotion and protection of investments has been signed between the two countries.

== Resident diplomatic missions ==
- Malaysia has an embassy in Lima.
- Peru has an embassy in Kuala Lumpur.
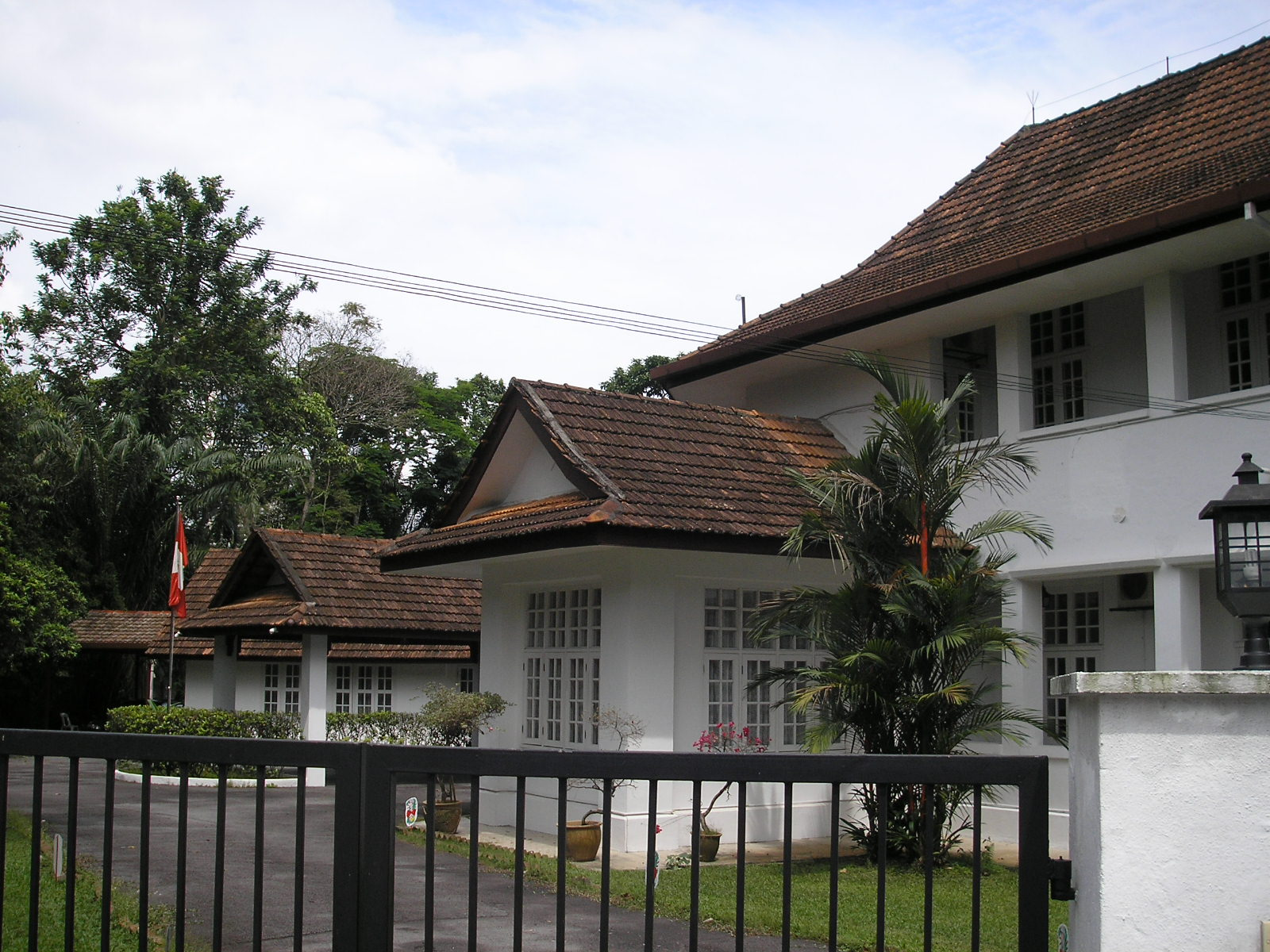
Embassy of Peru in Kuala Lumpur

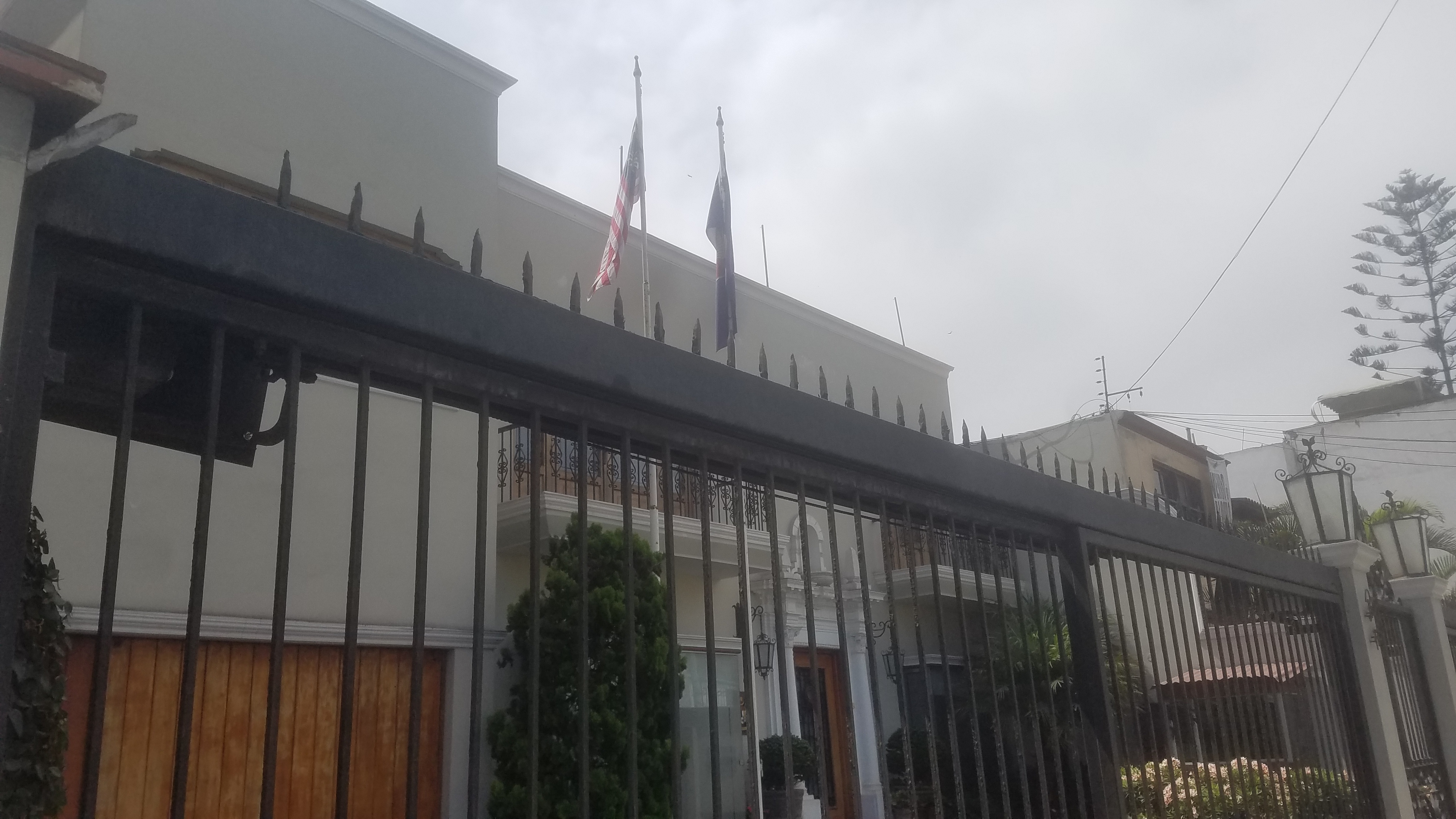
Embassy of Malaysia in Lima

== See also ==
- Foreign relations of Malaysia
- Foreign relations of Peru
- List of ambassadors of Peru to Malaysia
