= List of ambassadors of Malaysia to Cambodia =

Ambassador of Malaysia to Cambodia
- Incumbent; Vacant since 1 April 2018
- Style: His Excellency
- Seat: Phnom Penh, Cambodia
- Appointer: Yang di-Pertuan Agong
- Inaugural holder: Ismail Anbia as Chargé d'Affaires
- Formation: 1969
- Abolished: 1 April 2018
- Website: www.kln.gov.my/web/khm_phnom-penh/home

The ambassador of Malaysia to the Kingdom of Cambodia is the head of Malaysia's diplomatic mission to Cambodia. The position has the rank and status of an ambassador extraordinary and plenipotentiary and is based in the Embassy of Malaysia, Phnom Penh.

== List of heads of mission ==
=== Chargé d'Affaires to Cambodia ===
Chargé d'Affaires	Term start	Term end
Accredited from Beijing, China
Ismail Anbia	1969	1975

=== Ambassadors to Cambodia ===
Ambassador	Term start	Term end
Mohd Deva Ridzam Abdullah	18 December 1991	30 September 1996
Md. Kamal Ismaun	24 November 1996	11 June 1999
Ahmad Anuar Abdul Majid	14 September 1999	13 July 2003
Melanie Leong Sock Lei	8 September 2003	12 September 2005
Adnan Othman	25 January 2006	2 November 2008
Pengiran Mohd Hussein	3 May 2010	1 May 2013
Raszlan Abdul Rashid	10 October 2013	
Hasan Malek	1 April 2016	31 March 2018

== See also ==
- Cambodia–Malaysia relations
