= List of ambassadors of Malaysia to Hungary =

Ambassador of Malaysia to Hungary
- Incumbent; Cheong Loon Lai since 2017
- Style: His Excellency
- Seat: Budapest, Hungary
- Appointer: Yang di-Pertuan Agong
- Inaugural holder: B. Rajaram
- Formation: 1993
- Website: www.kln.gov.my/web/hun_budapest/home

The ambassador of Malaysia to Hungary is the head of Malaysia's diplomatic mission to Hungary. The position has the rank and status of an ambassador extraordinary and plenipotentiary and is based in the Embassy of Malaysia, Budapest.

== List of heads of mission ==
=== Ambassadors to Hungary ===
Ambassador	Term start	Term end
B. Rajaram	1993	1996
Wan Hussain Mustapha	1997	1999
Mohamad Sani	1999	2004
Wan Yusof Embong	2004	January 2006
Kamilan Maksom	February 2006	March 2014
Mohamad Sadik Kethergany	April 2014	January 2017
Cheong Loon Lai	29 May 2017	Incumbent

== See also ==
- Hungary–Malaysia relations
