= List of ambassadors of Malaysia to Laos =

Ambassador of Malaysia to Laos
- Incumbent; Mohd Aini Atan since 2017
- Style: His Excellency
- Seat: Vientiane, Laos
- Appointer: Yang di-Pertuan Agong
- Inaugural holder: Mon Jamaluddin as Chargé d'Affaires
- Formation: 1 March 1972
- Website: kln.gov.my/web/lao_vientiane

The ambassador of Malaysia to the Lao People's Democratic Republic is the head of Malaysia's diplomatic mission to Laos. The position has the rank and status of an ambassador extraordinary and plenipotentiary and is based in the Embassy of Malaysia, Vientiane.

== List of heads of mission ==
=== Chargés d'affaires to Laos ===
Chargé d'Affaires	Term start	Term end
Mon Jamaluddin	1 March 1972	27 April 1974

=== Ambassadors to Laos ===
Ambassador	Term start	Term end
Abdul Wahab Harun	4 June 1992	3 September 1995
Mohd Aini Atan	May 2017	Incumbent

== See also ==
- Laos–Malaysia relations
