= List of ambassadors of Malaysia to Brazil =

Coordinates: 15.851832°S 47.901064°W

Ambassador of Malaysia to Brazil
- Incumbent; Gloria Corina Anak Peter Tiwet since 2023
- Style: His Excellency
- Seat: Brasília, Brazil
- Appointer: Yang di-Pertuan Agong
- Inaugural holder: Khor Eng Hee
- Formation: 1981
- Website: www.kln.gov.my/web/bra_brasilia/home

The ambassador of Malaysia to the Federative Republic of Brazil is the head of Malaysia's diplomatic mission to Brazil. The position has the rank and status of an ambassador extraordinary and plenipotentiary and is based in the Embassy of Malaysia, Brasília.

== List of heads of mission ==
=== Ambassadors to Brazil ===
Ambassador	Term start	Term end
Khor Eng Hee	1981	1985
Ajit Singh	1985	1989
M. M. Sathiah	1989	1991
Looi Cheok Hun	1991	1995
Zainal Abidin Sulong	1995	1997
Subramaniam Thanarajasingam	1998	2001
Tai Kat Meng	2001	2005
Ismail Mustapha	2006	2009
Sudha Devi K. R. Vasudevan	2009	2014
Rahimi Harun	2014	2017
Lim Luay Jin	2017	2022
Gloria Corina Anak Peter Tiwet	2023	Incumbent

== See also ==
- Brazil–Malaysia relations
