= List of ambassadors of Malaysia to Cuba =

Ambassador of Malaysia to Cuba
- Incumbent; Roslan Bin Tan Sri Abdul Rahman since 2018
- Style: His Excellency
- Seat: Havana, Cuba
- Appointer: Yang di-Pertuan Agong
- Inaugural holder: Mohammad Kamal Yan Yahaya
- Formation: 21 March 2001
- Website: www.kln.gov.my/web/cub_havana/home

The ambassador of Malaysia to the Republic of Cuba is the head of Malaysia's diplomatic mission to Cuba. The position has the rank and status of an ambassador extraordinary and plenipotentiary and is based in the Embassy of Malaysia, Havana.

== List of heads of mission ==
=== Ambassadors to Cuba ===
Ambassador	Term start	Term end
Mohammad Kamal Yan Yahaya	21 March 2001	1 February 2005
Zainol Abidin Omar	5 February 2005	27 June 2008
Yean Yoke Heng	3 August 2008	11 June 2011
Jojie Samuel M.C. Samuel	17 July 2011	31 July 2014
Khairi Omar	27 January 2015	
Roslan Bin Tan Sri Abdul Rahman	10 September 2018	24 May 2021

== See also ==
- Cuba–Malaysia relations
