= List of ambassadors of Malaysia to Myanmar =

Coordinates: 16.789716°N 96.140228°E

Ambassador of Malaysia to Myanmar
- Incumbent; Zahairi Baharim since 3 May 2018
- Style: His Excellency
- Seat: Yangon, Myanmar
- Appointer: Yang di-Pertuan Agong
- Inaugural holder: Bahadur Hassan
- Formation: 5 February 1964
- Website: www.kln.gov.my/web/mmr_yangon/home

The ambassador of Malaysia to the Republic of the Union of Myanmar is the head of Malaysia's diplomatic mission to Myanmar. The position has the rank and status of an ambassador extraordinary and plenipotentiary and is based in the Embassy of Malaysia, Yangon.

== History ==
- In March 1958 the governments in Yangon and Kuala Lumpur established diplomatic relations.
- The first diplomatic Mission of the Government of Malaysia was opened at the Strand Hotel, Yangon.

== List of heads of mission ==
=== Ambassadors to Myanmar ===
Ambassador	Term start	Term end
Bahadur Hassan	5 February 1964	
Hashim Sultan	7 February 1966	
Abdul Rahman Jelol	3 January 1971	
Abdul Hamid Pawanchee	24 January 1973	
Kassim Mohamad Hussein	18 December 1975	
Yusof Ariff Abdul Rahman	8 December 1977	
Looi Cheok Hun	26 March 1982	
Mohd Amir Jafaar	15 November 1984	
Sallenhaddin Abdullah	24 November 1989	
John Tenewi Nuek	18 June 1992	
Abdul Wahab Harun	27 October 1995	
Mohamad Noh	25 March 1999	
Cheah Sam Kip	7 May 2002	
Shaharuddin Mohamed Som	10 February 2005	
Mazlan Muhammad	3 January 2008	
Ahmad Faisal Muhamad	9 September 2011	
Mohd Haniff Abd Rahman	6 September 2013	
Zahairi Baharim	3 May 2018	Incumbent

== See also ==
- Malaysia–Myanmar relations
