= List of ambassadors of Malaysia to Japan =

Coordinates: 35.652320°N 139.695504°E

Ambassador of Malaysia to Japan
- Incumbent; Dato Kennedy Jawan since Jan 2019
- Style: His Excellency
- Seat: Tokyo, Japan
- Appointer: Yang di-Pertuan Agong
- Inaugural holder: Lee Tiang Keng
- Formation: 1958
- Website: www.kln.gov.my/web/jpn_tokyo/

The ambassador of Malaysia to Japan is the head of Malaysia's diplomatic mission to Japan. The position has the rank and status of an ambassador extraordinary and plenipotentiary and is based in the Embassy of Malaysia, Tokyo.

== List of heads of mission ==
=== Ambassadors to Japan ===
Ambassador	Term start	Term end
Lee Tiang Keng	1958	1961
Syed Sheh Shahabudin	1961	1964
Tengku Indera Petra Sultan Ibrahim	1964	1967
Zaiton Ibrahim	1967	1968
Hussein Mohamed Osman	1969	1972
Raja Aznam Raja Ahmad	1972	1975
Lim Taik Choon	1975	1981
Jamaluddin Abu Bakar	1981	1986
Ahmad Kamil Jaafar	1986	1989
Mohamed Khatib Abdul Hamid	1989	1999
Marzuki Mohammad Noor	1999	2006
Mohd Radzi Abdul Rahman	2006	2009
Shaharuddin Md Som	2009	2014
Ahmad Izlan Idris	2015	2018
Dato' Kennedy Jawan	2019	Present

== See also ==
- Japan–Malaysia relations
