= Malaysia–Nepal relations =

- Malaysia: Nepal

Malaysia–Nepal relations refer to bilateral foreign relations between Malaysia and Nepal. Malaysia has an embassy in Kathmandu, and Nepal has an embassy in Kuala Lumpur.

== History ==
Both countries established diplomatic relations on 1 January 1960, with bilateral relations between Malaysia and Nepal have developed from historic grounds. In May 1978 and September 1985, King of Nepal Birendra and Queen Aishwarya paid unofficial visits to Malaysia. In June 2003, a Nepal's resident mission was established in Kuala Lumpur.

== Recruitment from Nepal ==
Nepal also one of the main manpower sources for Malaysia other than India, Bangladesh, Indonesia, Burma, Vietnam and the Philippines. Since 2001, an agreement was signed between the two governments to allow Nepalese manpower to work in Malaysia. In 2013, there were almost 500,000 Nepalese working in various sectors in Malaysia. One of the reasons many Nepalese workers are going to Malaysia is due to the lack of work in their own home country.

== Economic relations ==
In 2013, the total trade between two countries worth around U$35 million with Malaysia's main exports to Nepal were machineries and vehicles parts, vegetable oils, electrical equipments and appliances, furniture and parts, plastics and other chemical products while the exports from Nepal are mainly in paper, tobacco, flour, coffee, tea, mate and spices, electrical machinery and equipment, works of art, collectors pieces and antiques. Several memorandum of understanding (MoU) also has been signed to increase bilateral trade between the two countries. Both countries are also in the process of boosting tourism and cultural relations. Besides that, Nepal is also welcoming any Malaysian investment to their country.

== See also ==
- Nepalese in Malaysia
