= List of ambassadors of Malaysia to the Czech Republic =

Ambassador of Malaysia to the Czech Republic
- Incumbent; Zanariah Zainal Abidin since 6 October 2017
- Style: His Excellency
- Seat: Prague, Czech Republic
- Appointer: Yang di-Pertuan Agong
- Inaugural holder: Othman Hashim
- Formation: 4 January 2002
- Website: www.kln.gov.my/web/cze_prague/home

The ambassador of Malaysia to the Czech Republic is the head of Malaysia's diplomatic mission to the Czech Republic. The position has the rank and status of an ambassador extraordinary and plenipotentiary and is based in the Embassy of Malaysia, Prague.

== List of heads of mission ==
=== Ambassadors to the Czech Republic ===
Ambassador	Term start	Term end
Othman Hashim	4 January 2002	20 June 2005
Salman Ahmad	1 August 2005	6 January 2009
Zainal Abidin Bakar	30 January 2009	30 June 2013
Nadzirah Osman	30 January 2014	29 June 2017
Zanariah Zainal Abidin	6 October 2017	Incumbent

== See also ==
- Czech Republic–Malaysia relations
