= List of ambassadors of Malaysia to Bahrain =

Ambassador of Malaysia to Bahrain
- Incumbent; Dato’ Shazryll Zahiran since 15 June 2021
- Style: His Excellency
- Seat: Manama, Bahrain
- Appointer: Yang di-Pertuan Agong
- Inaugural holder: Naimun Ashakli Mohammad
- Formation: 2003
- Website: www.kln.gov.my/web/bhr_manama/home

The ambassador of Malaysia to the Kingdom of Bahrain is the head of Malaysia's diplomatic mission to Bahrain. The position has the rank and status of an ambassador extraordinary and plenipotentiary and is based in the Embassy of Malaysia, Manama.

== List of heads of mission ==
=== Ambassadors to Bahrain ===
Ambassador	Term start	Term end
Naimun Ashakli Mohammad	2003	2007
Syed Sultan Syed Idris	2007	2011
Ahmad Shahizan Abd Samad	22 November 2011	13 January 2017
Agus Salim Yusof	13 April 2017	15 June 2021

== See also ==
- Bahrain–Malaysia relations
