= List of ambassadors of Malaysia to Sudan =

Ambassador of Malaysia to Sudan
- Incumbent; Mohamad Razdan Jamil since 2018
- Style: His Excellency
- Seat: Khartoum, Sudan
- Appointer: Yang di-Pertuan Agong
- Inaugural holder: Ibrahim Abdullah as Chargé d'affaires
- Website: www.kln.gov.my/web/sdn_khartoum/home

The ambassador of Malaysia to the Republic of the Sudan is the head of Malaysia's diplomatic mission to Sudan. The position has the rank and status of an ambassador extraordinary and plenipotentiary and is based in the Embassy of Malaysia, Khartoum.

== List of heads of mission ==
=== Chargé d'affaires to Sudan ===
Chargé d'affaires	Term start	Term end
Ibrahim Abdullah		

=== Ambassadors to Sudan ===
Ambassador	Term start	Term end
Abdul Mubin Razali	2001	
Mohd Zamri Mohd Kassim		
Zainal Hamzah		
Mohd Ashri Muda		
Mustafa Mansor		
Mohamad Razdan Jamil	2018	Incumbent

== See also ==
- Malaysia–Sudan relations
