= List of ambassadors of Malaysia to Venezuela =

Ambassador of Malaysia to Venezuela
- Incumbent; Vacant
- Style: His Excellency
- Seat: Caracas, Venezuela
- Appointer: Yang di-Pertuan Agong
- Inaugural holder: John Tenewi Nuek
- Formation: 30 June 2000
- Website: www.kln.gov.my/web/ven_caracas/home

The ambassador of Malaysia to the Bolivarian Republic of Venezuela is the head of Malaysia's diplomatic mission to Venezuela. The position has the rank and status of an ambassador extraordinary and plenipotentiary and is based in the Embassy of Malaysia, Caracas.

== List of heads of mission ==
=== Chargé d'affaires to Venezuela ===
Chargé d'affaires	Term start	Term end
Mohd Raizul Nizam Zulkiffli	21 August 2018	Incumbent

=== Ambassadors to Venezuela ===
Ambassador	Term start	Term end
John Tenewi Nuek	30 June 2000	28 August 2005
Ramli Naam	11 July 2005	4 March 2008
Ramlan Kimin	1 August 2008	10 June 2011
Mahinder Singh	31 July 2011	7 July 2016
Muzafar Shah Mustafa	15 August 2016	20 August 2018

== See also ==
- Malaysia–Venezuela relations
