= List of high commissioners of Malaysia to Kenya =

High Commissioner of Malaysia to Kenya
- Incumbent; Loh Seck Tiong since September 2017
- Style: His Excellency
- Seat: Nairobi, Kenya
- Appointer: Yang di-Pertuan Agong
- Inaugural holder: Selwyn Das
- Formation: 30 September 2005
- Website: www.kln.gov.my/web/ken_nairobi/home

The high commissioner of Malaysia to the Republic of Kenya is the head of Malaysia's diplomatic mission to Kenya. The position has the rank and status of an ambassador extraordinary and plenipotentiary and is based in the High Commission of Malaysia, Nairobi.

== List of heads of mission ==
=== High commissioners to Kenya ===
High Commissioner	Term start	Term end
Selwyn Das	30 September 2005	10 January 2009
Zainol Rahim Zainuddin	15 December 2009	30 April 2011
Ismail Salam	2 May 2012	1 June 2017
Loh Seck Tiong	September 2017	Incumbent

== See also ==
- Kenya–Malaysia relations
