= List of high commissioners of Malaysia to Papua New Guinea =

High Commissioner of Malaysia to Papua New Guinea
- Incumbent; Vacant
- Style: His Excellency
- Seat: Port Moresby, Papua New Guinea
- Appointer: Yang di-Pertuan Agong
- Inaugural holder: Kamarudin Abu
- Formation: 1983
- Website: www.kln.gov.my/web/png_port-moresby/home

The high commissioner of Malaysia to the Independent State of Papua New Guinea is the head of Malaysia's diplomatic mission to Papua New Guinea. The position has the rank and status of an ambassador extraordinary and plenipotentiary and is based in the High Commission of Malaysia, Port Moresby.

== List of heads of mission ==
=== High commissioners to Papua New Guinea ===
High Commissioner	Term start	Term end
Kamarudin Abu	1983	
B. Bajaram	1986	
V. Yoogalingam	1989	
M. Santhananaban	1992	
Mohamad Sani	1996	
Mohamad Fadzil Ayob	1999	
Kamilan Maksom	2002	
Blanche Olbery	2009	
Jilid Kuminding	2013	2017
Mohamad Nasri Abdul Rahman	2018	

== See also ==
- Malaysia–Papua New Guinea relations
