= List of ambassadors of Malaysia to the Netherlands =

Ambassador of Malaysia to the Netherlands
- Incumbent; Roseli bin Abdul since 29 September 2023
- Style: His Excellency
- Seat: The Hague, Netherlands
- Appointer: Yang di-Pertuan Agong
- Inaugural holder: Philip Kouk Hock Khee
- Formation: 20 September 1966
- Website: www.kln.gov.my/web/nld_the-hague/home

The ambassador of Malaysia to the Netherlands is the head of Malaysia's diplomatic mission to the Netherlands. The position has the rank and status of an ambassador extraordinary and plenipotentiary and is based in the Embassy of Malaysia, The Hague.

== List of heads of mission ==
=== Ambassadors to the Netherlands ===
Ambassador	Term start	Term end
Philip Kuok Hock Khee	20 September 1966	3 November 1970
Abdul Hamid Jumat	17 November 1970	23 July 1973
Mohd Sany Abdul Ghaffar	10 October 1973	16 June 1975
Ungku Nazaruddin Ungku Mohamad	10 September 1975	16 June 1978
Tengku Abdul Aziz	26 September 1978	28 October 1982
K. Thamaratnam	28 February 1983	20 May 1985
Nik Mohammad Nik Hassan	26 August 1985	13 March 1989
Khalid Abdul Karim	5 April 1989	18 December 1993
Salehuddin Abdullah	16 June 1994	8 September 1996
A. Ghanapathy	4 December 1996	2 August 2000
Noor Farida Ariffin	31 October 2000	12 January 2007
Fauziah Mohd Taib	9 August 2008	26 March 2015
Ahmad Nazri Yusof	2 September 2015	28 November 2019
Nadzirah Osman	20 August 2021	
Roseli Bin Abdul	29 September 2023	Incumbent

== See also ==
- Malaysia–Netherlands relations
