= List of ambassadors of Malaysia to Belgium =

Ambassador of Malaysia to Belgium
- Incumbent; Ahmad Rozian Abd. Ghani since 1 September 2021
- Style: His Excellency
- Residence: Avenue De Tervueren, 414A 1150 Brussels
- Seat: Brussels, Belgium
- Appointer: Yang di-Pertuan Agong
- Inaugural holder: Peter Stephen Lai
- Formation: 16 June 1975
- Website: www.kln.gov.my/web/bel_brussels/home

The ambassador of Malaysia to the Kingdom of Belgium is the head of Malaysia's diplomatic mission to Belgium. The position has the rank and status of an ambassador extraordinary and plenipotentiary and is based in the Embassy of Malaysia, Brussels.

== List of heads of mission ==
=== Ambassadors to Belgium ===
| Ambassador | Term start | Term end |
|---|---|---|
| Peter Stephen Lai | 16 June 1975 | 30 June 1976 |
| P. G. Lim | 18 February 1977 | 27 September 1979 |
| Kassim Hussein | 15 September 1980 | 3 February 1983 |
| Mustapha Mahmud | 26 March 1983 | 25 November 1986 |
| Noor Adlan Yahayaudin | 19 February 1986 | 2 January 1990 |
| Dali Mahmud Hashim | 8 March 1990 | 17 October 1993 |
| M. M. Sathiah | 23 December 1993 | 14 May 1999 |
| Mohd Ridzam Deva Abdullah | 18 August 1999 | 25 July 2005 |
| Mohammad Kamal Yan Yahaya | 21 December 2005 | 27 July 2008 |
| Hussein Haniff | 24 August 2008 | 30 March 2011 |
| Zainuddin Yahya | 23 September 2011 | 15 January 2015 |
| Nafisah Mohamed | 23 January 2015 | 3 June 2016 |
| Hasnudin Hamzah | 18 August 2016 | 19 August 2019 |
| Ahmad Rozian Abd.Ghani | 1 September 2021 | Incumbent |

== See also ==
- Belgium–Malaysia relations
