= Fenny Nuli =

Malaysian diplomat

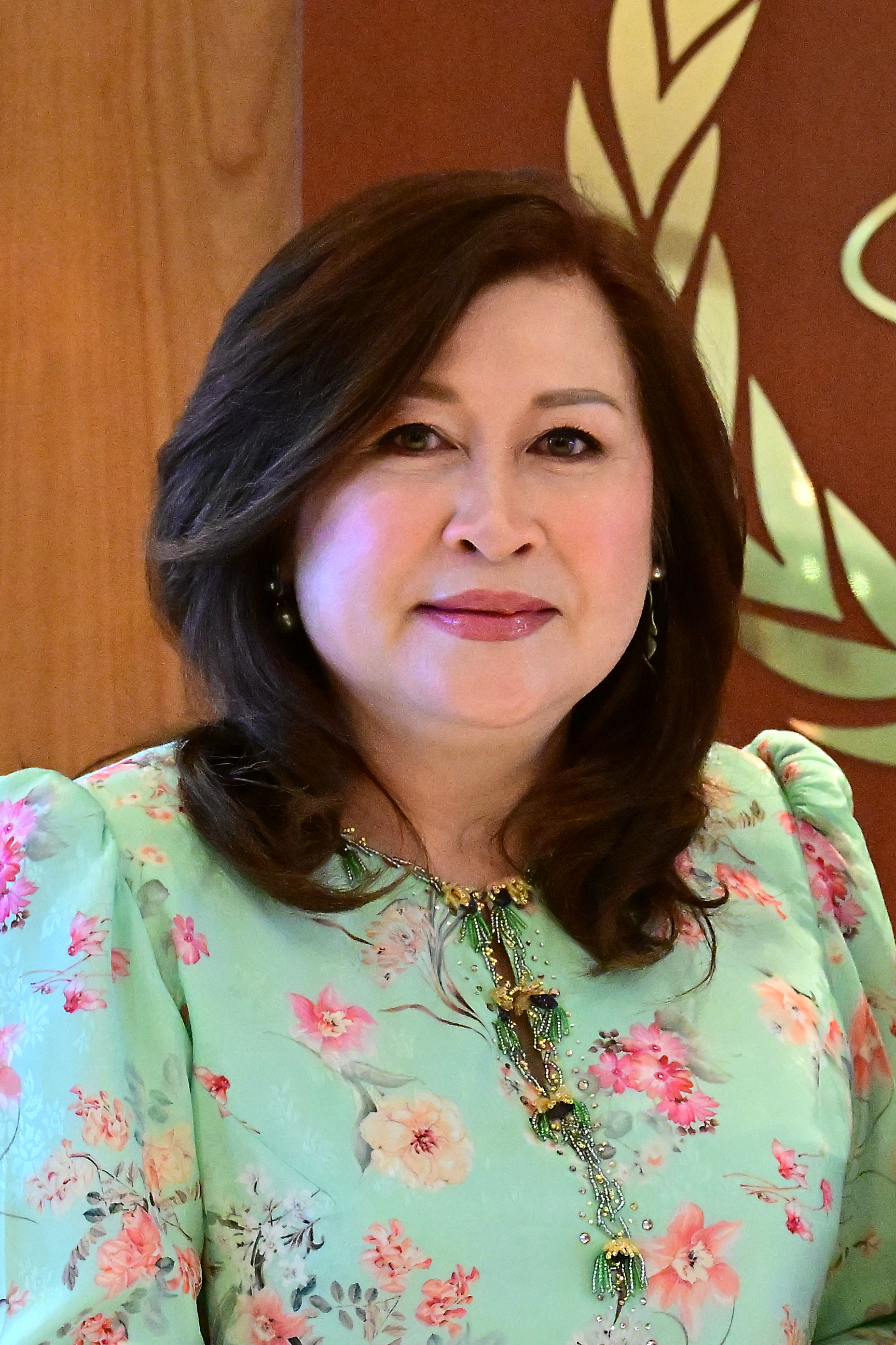
in 2026

Dato Fenny anak Nuli (born 1971 or 1972) is a Malaysian diplomat who became the ambassador-designate to Austria, Slovakia, and UN bodies on 18 May 2026. Previously, Fenny was the ambassador to Peru, with concurrent accreditation to Bolivia, Colombia, and Panama from 2019 to 2023 and as director of the foreign ministry's Sarawak office from 2024 to 2026. She is the first Iban woman to become an ambassador.

== Early life and education ==
Nuli was born in 1971 or 1972 (Note: Was mentioned as 48 years old at the time of her appointment as ambassador in Peru on 2 October 2019.) in Rumah Sebangki Panjai, Lubok Antu, Sri Aman, Sarawak. She was the youngest of four, having one brother and two sisters. Her late uncle, Datuk Dublin Unting, motivated her to pursue a career.

Nuli began her education at Sekolah Rendah Bantuan (SRB) Chung Hua Simanggang, which later became Sekolah Jenis Kebangsaan (SJK) Chung Hua. She completed her secondary education at Sekolah Menengah Kebangsaan (SMK) Simanggang. She attended the Universiti Sains Malaysia in Penang, graduating in 1996 amidst an economic recession. She worked as a teacher in Simanggang before joining Malaysia's foreign ministry as an administrative and diplomatic officer. She received a diploma in administration and completed training in the foreign ministry's Institute of Diplomacy and Foreign Relations during which Nuli chose to study German.

== Diplomatic career ==
Nuli started her career as an administrative and diplomatic officer with the foreign ministry in 1997. Her diplomatic service began as assistant director for ASEAN, serving until 2001. Afterwards, she took up her first overseas posting at the permanent mission in Geneva, where she was accorded the diplomatic rank of second secretary.

Following her return to Wisma Putra, Nuli worked as the assistant secretary for finance from 2005 to 2006, and was subsequently designated as director for ASEAN from 2006 until 2008. She returned to an overseas assignment in 2009, serving at the embassy in Bangkok, Thailand, with the diplomatic rank of minister counsellor until 2012. Her appointment happened against a background of political unrests initiated by the Red Shirt protest group, with Nuli having to send daily reports to the foreign ministry headquarters amidst a shooting that occurred almost every night for a few weeks.

Returning to Malaysia, she was appointed of principal assistant secretary for multilateral economic and environment from 2013 until 2015, and undersecretary for International Cooperation and Development from 2015 until 2016. In 2016, she was sent to Belgium, where she served as deputy chief of mission in Brussels until 2019.

=== Ambassador to Peru ===
On 2 October 2019, Nuli received her credentials from the King of Malaysia Abdullah as the ambassador to Peru, with concurrent accreditations to Bolivia, Colombia, and Panama. This appointment made her the first Iban woman to serve as an ambassador. She arrived in Peru and presented her credentials to the president of Peru Martín Vizcarra on 3 December 2019, president of Colombia Iván Duque on 30 June 2020, president of Panama Laurentino Cortizo on 29 March 2022, and president of Bolivia Luis Arce on 26 September 2022.

During the COVID pandemic, her embassy organized a flight that repatriated Malaysian citizens from both Peru and Bolivia. Nuli also coordinated the successful rescue of 43 Malaysian victims of a job scam.

=== Director in Sarawak ===
Following her return to Malaysia, she accepted the role as the director of the foreign ministry's office in Sarawak, assuming the role since 2 January 2024. She chose the role immediately because the developing status of Sarawak and regional shifts in neighboring countries required a senior officer. In this position, she collaborated with the Sarawak Premier, interacts with foreign ambassadors and important dignitaries, and delivers lectures on diplomacy to university students. She also utilized her office to work with relevant agencies to counter the rise of job scams affecting Sarawakians, drawing directly from her rescue experiences in Peru.

=== Ambassador to Austria ===
On 18 May 2026, Nuli received her credentials from King Ibrahim as ambassador to Austria, with concurrent accreditation to Slovakia and international bodies based in Vienna.

== Personal life ==
Nuli is single and has no children. Her personal philosophy is based on the traditional Iban warrior motto, Agi Idup Agi Ngelaban (as long as I live, I shall fight).
