= List of high commissioners of Malaysia to Singapore =

High Commissioner of Malaysia to Singapore
- Incumbent; Azfar Mohamad Mustafar since June 2021
- Style: His Excellency
- Seat: Singapore
- Appointer: Yang di-Pertuan Agong
- Inaugural holder: Jamal Abdul Latiff
- Formation: 5 September 1965
- Website: www.kln.gov.my/web/sgp_singapore/home

The high commissioner of Malaysia to the Republic of Singapore is the head of Malaysia's diplomatic mission to Singapore. The position has the rank and status of an ambassador extraordinary and plenipotentiary and is based in the High Commission of Malaysia, Singapore.

== List of heads of mission ==
=== High commissioners to Singapore ===
High Commissioner	Term start	Term end
Jamal Abdul Latiff	5 September 1965	3 February 1971
Abdullah Ali	30 March 1971	26 February 1975
Yusoff Zainal	5 April 1975	20 September 1978
Abdul Malek	7 December 1978	10 November 1980
Syed Ahmad Shahabuddin	23 February 1981	4 December 1984
K. Tharmaratnam	30 January 1985	20 August 1989
Zainal Abidin Mokhtar	19 November 1989	30 November 1991
Emam Mohd Haniff	18 January 1992	19 October 1997
Salim Hashim	12 November 1997	11 February 2001
Hamidon Ali	23 February 2001	28 May 2003
N. Parameswaran	2 June 2003	25 October 2008
Md. Hussin Nayan	29 January 2009	14 June 2013
Husni Zai Yaacob	29 August 2013	7 January 2016
Ilango Karuppannan	25 April 2016	30 April 2017
Zulkifli Adnan	10 October 2017	9 May 2018
Zainol Rahim Zainuddin	9 November 2018	April 2020
Azfar Mohamad Mustafar	June 2021	Incumbent

== See also ==
- Malaysia–Singapore relations
