= List of ambassadors of Malaysia to Switzerland =

Ambassador of Malaysia to Switzerland
- Incumbent; Sharrina Abdullah since 2017
- Style: His Excellency
- Seat: Bern, Switzerland
- Appointer: Yang di-Pertuan Agong
- Inaugural holder: Ismail Mustapha
- Formation: 13 April 2003
- Website: www.kln.gov.my/web/che_berne/home

The ambassador of Malaysia to the Swiss Confederation is the head of Malaysia's diplomatic mission to Switzerland. The position has the rank and status of an ambassador extraordinary and plenipotentiary and is based in the Embassy of Malaysia, Bern.

== List of heads of mission ==
=== Ambassadors to Switzerland ===
Ambassador	Term start	Term end
Ismail Mustapha	13 April 2003	14 December 2005
Mohd Yusof Ahmad	29 January 2006	25 January 2010
Ho May Yong	28 May 2010	19 September 2013
Mohd Zulkephli Mohd Noor	23 January 2014	3 February 2016
Mahinder Singh Ram Singh	20 August 2016	27 April 2017
Sharrina Abdullah	2017	Incumbent

== See also ==
- Malaysia–Switzerland relations
