= List of ambassadors of Malaysia to Turkey =

Ambassador of Malaysia to Turkey
- Incumbent; Abd Razak Abdul Wahab since 18 August 2016
- Style: His Excellency
- Seat: Ankara, Turkey
- Appointer: Yang di-Pertuan Agong
- Inaugural holder: Ahmad Zainal Abidin Yusof as Chargé d'Affaires
- Formation: 11 May 1971
- Website: www.kln.gov.my/web/tur_ankara/home

The ambassador of Malaysia to the Republic of Turkey is the head of Malaysia's diplomatic mission to Turkey. The position has the rank and status of an ambassador extraordinary and plenipotentiary and is based in the Embassy of Malaysia, Ankara.

== List of heads of mission ==
=== Chargés d'affaires to Turkey ===
Chargé d'affaires	Term start	Term end
Accredited from Tehran, Iran
Ahmad Zainal Abidin Yusof	11 May 1971	11 February 1973
Yusof Zainal	19 April 1973	1975
Yusof Rawa	17 October 1975	30 May 1978

=== Ambassadors to Turkey ===
Ambassador	Term start	Term end
Mohamed Mustapha Mahmud	20 June 1978	2 July 1980
Abdullah Zawawi Mohamad	3 July 1980	31 October 1982
Ismail Ambia	2 November 1982	26 August 1985
Kamaruddin Abu	11 September 1985	18 July 1988
B. Rajaram	26 October 1988	22 May 1991
Zaibedah Ahmad	1991	January 1996
Abdul Jalil Haron	27 December 1996	July 2001
Melanie Leong Sock Lei	12 September 2001	17 July 2003
Ahmad Mokhtar Selat	10 October 2003	2 February 2006
Saipul Anuar Abd Muin	27 March 2007	23 January 2014
Amran Mohamed Zin	12 March 2014	30 June 2016
Abd Razak Abdul Wahab	18 August 2016	Incumbent

== See also ==
- Malaysia–Turkey relations
