= List of ambassadors of Malaysia to Croatia =

Ambassador of Malaysia to Croatia
- Incumbent; Mohd Hassan Bal since 27 September 2016
- Style: His Excellency
- Seat: Zagreb, Croatia
- Appointer: Yang di-Pertuan Agong
- Inaugural holder: Ku Jaafar Ku Shaari as Chargé d'Affaires
- Formation: 15 July 1994
- Website: www.kln.gov.my/web/hrv_zagreb/home

The ambassador of Malaysia to the Republic of Croatia is the head of Malaysia's diplomatic mission to the Republic of Croatia. The position has the rank and status of an ambassador extraordinary and plenipotentiary and is based in the Embassy of Malaysia, Zagreb.

== List of heads of mission ==
=== Chargés d'Affaires to Croatia ===
Chargé d'Affaires	Term start	Term end
Ku Jaafar Ku Shaari	15 July 1994	19 May 1995
Kamal Ismaun	20 May 1995	25 October 1996
Ramlan Ibrahim	26 October 1996	28 July 2000
Mohd Zamri Mohd Kassim	28 August 2000	2 August 2003

=== Ambassadors to Croatia ===
Ambassador	Term start	Term end
M.N. Azman	3 August 2003	1 July 2007
Aminahtun Abdul Karim	14 December 2007	30 June 2011
Yean Yoke Heng	24 September 2011	11 July 2014
Saiful Azam Martinus Abdullah	29 September 2014	22 April 2016
Mohd Hassan Bal	27 September 2016	Incumbent

== See also ==
- Croatia–Malaysia relations
