= List of ambassadors of Malaysia to Thailand =

Ambassador of Malaysia to Thailand
- Incumbent; Wan Zaidi Wan Abdullah since 2025
- Style: His Excellency
- Seat: Bangkok, Thailand
- Appointer: Yang di-Pertuan Agong
- Inaugural holder: Syed Sheh Shahabudin
- Formation: 1 July 1958
- Website: www.kln.gov.my/web/tha_bangkok/home

The ambassador of Malaysia to the Kingdom of Thailand is the head of Malaysia's diplomatic mission to Thailand. The position has the rank and status of an ambassador extraordinary and plenipotentiary and is based in the Embassy of Malaysia, Bangkok.

== List of heads of mission ==
=== Ambassadors to Thailand ===
Ambassador	Term start	Term end
Syed Sheh Shahabudin	1 July 1958	10 July 1961
Yaacob Abdul Latiff	26 July 1961	22 June 1965
Tengku Ngah Mohamed Tengku Sri Akar	16 December 1965	15 October 1970
Abdul Hamid Bidin	12 November 1970	20 September 1974
Abdul Rahman Abdul Jalal	15 November 1974	26 March 1978
Shahuddin Mohd Taib	3 May 1978	5 July 1983
Ismail Mohammad	11 October 1983	3 June 1986
Bakri Ayub Ghazali	22 July 1986	24 August 1989
Kamaruddin Abu	24 September 1989	10 February 1993
Zainal Abidin Alias	24 February 1993	February 1996
Syed Ariff Fadzillah Syed Awaluddin	20 February 1996	5 December 2001
Syed Norulzaman Syed Kamarulzaman	21 December 2001	4 January 2005
Shaarani Ibrahim	7 February 2005	18 August 2008
Husni Zai Yaacob	24 November 2008	20 September 2010
Jojie Samuel MC Samuel	5 January 2018	
Wan Zaidi Wan Abdullah	September 2025	Incumbent

== See also ==
- Malaysia–Thailand relations
