= List of ambassadors of Malaysia to Kazakhstan =

Ambassador of Malaysia to Kazakhstan
- Incumbent; Syed Mohamad Bakri since April 2017
- Style: His Excellency
- Seat: Astana, Kazakhstan
- Appointer: Yang di-Pertuan Agong
- Inaugural holder: Hashim Ismail as Chargé d'Affaires
- Formation: December 1996
- Website: www.kln.gov.my/web/kaz_astana/home

The ambassador of Malaysia to the Republic of Kazakhstan is the head of Malaysia's diplomatic mission to Kazakhstan. The position has the rank and status of an ambassador extraordinary and plenipotentiary and is based in the Embassy of Malaysia, Astana.

== List of heads of mission ==
=== Chargés d'affaires to Kazakhstan ===
Chargé d'Affaires	Term start	Term end
Hashim Ismail	December 1996	December 2000

=== Ambassadors to Kazakhstan ===
Ambassador	Term start	Term end
Tan Seng Sung	March 2001	March 2004
Than Tai Hing	May 2004	June 2008
Saw Ching Hong	February 2009	October 2010
Ahmad Rasidi Hazizi	May 2011	December 2013
Hidayat Abdul Hamid	January 2014	March 2017
Syed Mohamad Bakri	April 2017	Incumbent

== See also ==
- Kazakhstan–Malaysia relations
