= List of ambassadors of Malaysia to Ireland =

Ambassador of Malaysia to Ireland
- Incumbent; Zakaria Nasir since 18 July 2019
- Style: His Excellency
- Seat: Dublin, Ireland
- Appointer: Yang di-Pertuan Agong
- Inaugural holder: Ali Abdullah
- Formation: 2001
- Website: www.kln.gov.my/web/irl_dublin/home

The ambassador of Malaysia to Ireland is the head of Malaysia's diplomatic mission to Ireland. The position has the rank and status of an ambassador extraordinary and plenipotentiary and is based in the Embassy of Malaysia, Dublin.

== List of heads of mission ==
=== Ambassadors to Ireland ===
Ambassador	Term start	Term end
Ali Abdullah	2001	2005
Siddiq Firdause Mohd Ali	2005	2007
Raja Nazrin Raja Aznam	9 October 2008	13 March 2010
Ramli Naam	15 July 2011	3 April 2014
Syed Sultan Mohd Idris	1 August 2014	28 December 2016
Siti Hajjar Adnin	25 March 2017	5 September 2018
Zakaria Nasir	18 July 2019	Incumbent
