= List of high commissioners of Malaysia to Fiji =

High Commissioner of Malaysia to Fiji
- Incumbent; Ilham Tuah Illias since 2018
- Style: His Excellency
- Seat: Suva, Fiji
- Appointer: Yang di-Pertuan Agong
- Inaugural holder: Karim Marzuki
- Formation: May 1982
- Website: www.kln.gov.my/web/fji_suva/home

The high commissioner of Malaysia to the Republic of Fiji is the head of Malaysia's diplomatic mission to Fiji. The position has the rank and status of an ambassador extraordinary and plenipotentiary and is based in the High Commission of Malaysia, Suva.

== List of heads of mission ==
=== Chargés d'affaires to Fiji ===
Chargé d'Affaires	Term start	Term end
Nor Azam Mohd Idrus	July 2009	December 2013
Edi Irwan Mahmud	December 2013	August 2015
Hamizan Hashim	2015	2018

=== High commissioners to Fiji ===
High Commissioner	Term start	Term end
Karim Marzuki	May 1982	April 1986
Ting Wen Lian	May 1986	August 1989
Syed Ariff Fadzillah Syed Awaluddin	October 1989	August 1991
Ng Bak Hai	October 1991	May 1996
Takwir Din	March 1997	January 2003
Fauziah Mohd Taib	May 2003	January 2005
Nafisah Mohamed	February 2005	July 2008
Ilham Tuah Illias	2018	Incumbent

== See also ==
- Fiji–Malaysia relations
