= List of ambassadors of Malaysia to Serbia =

Ambassador of Malaysia to Serbia
- Incumbent; Vacant since 1 November 2008
- Style: His Excellency
- Seat: Belgrade, Serbia
- Appointer: Yang di-Pertuan Agong
- Inaugural holder: Saw Ching Hong
- Formation: 13 February 2004
- Website: www.kln.gov.my/web/srb_belgrade/home

The ambassador of Malaysia to the Republic of Serbia is the head of Malaysia's diplomatic mission to Serbia. The position has the rank and status of an ambassador extraordinary and plenipotentiary and is based in the Embassy of Malaysia, Belgrade.

== List of heads of mission ==
=== Chargés d'Affaires to Serbia ===
| Chargé d'Affaires | Term start | Term end |
|---|---|---|
| Amizal Fadzli Rajali | 1 November 2008 | 11 December 2011 |
| Yubazlan Yusof | 11 December 2011 | 24 January 2016 |
| Nik Ady Arman Nik Mohd Kamil | 14 February 2016 | Incumbent |

=== Ambassadors to Serbia ===
| Ambassador | Term start | Term end |
|---|---|---|
| Saw Ching Hong | 13 February 2004 | 31 October 2008 |

== See also ==
- Malaysia–Serbia relations
