= List of ambassadors of Malaysia to Azerbaijan =

Ambassador of Malaysia to Azerbaijan
- Incumbent; Yubazlan Yusof since 7 November 2018
- Style: His Excellency
- Seat: Baku, Azerbaijan
- Appointer: Yang di-Pertuan Agong
- Inaugural holder: Roslan Bin Tan Sri Abdul Rahman
- Formation: 8 September 2014
- Website: www.kln.gov.my/web/aze_baku/home

The ambassador of Malaysia to the Republic of Azerbaijan is the head of Malaysia's diplomatic mission to Azerbaijan. The position has the rank and status of an ambassador extraordinary and plenipotentiary and is based in the Embassy of Malaysia, Baku.

== List of heads of mission ==
=== Ambassadors to Azerbaijan ===
Ambassador	Term start	Term end
Roslan Bin Tan Sri Abdul Rahman	8 September 2014	2018
Yubazlan Yusof	7 November 2018	Incumbent

== See also ==
- Azerbaijan–Malaysia relations
