= List of ambassadors of Malaysia to Saudi Arabia =

Ambassador of Malaysia to Saudi Arabia
- Incumbent; Wan Zaidi Wan Abdullah since 7 September 2022
- Style: His Excellency
- Seat: Riyadh, Saudi Arabia
- Appointer: Yang di-Pertuan Agong
- Inaugural holder: Mokhtar Ahmad
- Formation: 1 November 1985
- Website: www.kln.gov.my/web/sau_riyadh/home

The ambassador of Malaysia to the Kingdom of Saudi Arabia is the head of Malaysia's diplomatic mission to Saudi Arabia. The position has the rank and status of an ambassador extraordinary and plenipotentiary and is based in the Embassy of Malaysia, Riyadh.

== List of heads of mission ==
=== Ambassadors to Saudi Arabia ===
| Ambassador | Term start | Term end |
|---|---|---|
| Mokhtar Ahmad | 1 November 1985 | 28 August 1988 |
| Adnan Osman | 26 September 1988 | 31 July 1993 |
| Mohamad Hussein Shafie | 4 October 1993 | 1 June 1995 |
| Shapii Abu Samah | 19 July 1995 | 1 August 2000 |
| Wan Mokhtar Ahmad | 23 November 2000 | 31 May 2005 |
| Ismail Ibrahim | 7 August 2005 | 6 January 2008 |
| Syed Omar Syed Mohamad Al-Saggaf | 2 September 2008 | 21 September 2013 |
| Zainol Rahim Zainuddin | 4 June 2015 | 20 December 2018 |
| Abd Razak Abdul Wahab | 18 July 2019 | 31 January 2022 |
| Wan Zaidi Wan Abdullah | 7 September 2022 | Incumbent |

== See also ==
- Malaysia–Saudi Arabia relations
