= Yeop Adlan Che Rose =

Former Malaysian diplomat

Yeop Adlan bin Che Rose (Jawi: يوڤ عدلان بن چئ روس) is a former Malaysian diplomat who has served as a diplomat in foreign countries, such as Mexico, Brazil, Argentina and a few African countries.

In 2017, he joined the Democratic Action Party.

== Election results ==
Parliament of Malaysia
Year	Constituency	Candidate	Votes	Pct	Opponent(s)	Votes	Pct	Ballots cast	Majority	Turnout
2004	P101 Hulu Langat	Yeop Adlan Che Rose (PAS)	18,160	30.73%	Markiman Kobiran (UMNO)	40,937	69.27%	61,209	22,777	76.51%

== Honours ==
=== Honours of Malaysia ===
- Malaysia :
  - Officer of the Order of the Defender of the Realm (KMN) (1980)
  - Commander of the Order of Loyalty to the Royal Family of Malaysia (PSD) – Datuk (1991)
- Perak :
  - Knight Commander of the Order of Cura Si Manja Kini (DPCM) – Dato' (1986)
