= List of high commissioners of Malaysia to Pakistan =

High Commissioner of Malaysia to Pakistan
- Incumbent; Vacant since May 2021
- Style: His Excellency
- Seat: Islamabad, Pakistan
- Appointer: Yang di-Pertuan Agong
- Inaugural holder: Tunku Mohamad Tunku Burhanuddin
- Formation: 1957
- Website: www.kln.gov.my/web/pak_islamabad/home

The high commissioner of Malaysia to the Islamic Republic of Pakistan is the head of Malaysia's diplomatic mission to Pakistan. The position has the rank and status of an ambassador extraordinary and plenipotentiary and is based in the High Commission of Malaysia, Islamabad.

== List of heads of mission ==
=== High commissioners to Pakistan ===
| High Commissioner | Term start | Term end |
Karachi
| Tunku Mohamad Tunku Burhanuddin | 1957 | 1959 |
| Mohd Baba | | |
| Tengku Dato’ Indera Putra | | |
| Kamaruddin Ariff | | |
Islamabad
| Abdul Malik | 1975 | 1978 |
| Ismail Budin | 1978 | 1981 |
| Dali Hashim | 1981 | 1983 |
| Emam Mohammed Hanif | 1983 | 1986 |
| Abdul Kadir Mohammed | 1986 | 1990 |
| Yusof Hashim | 1990 | 1994 |
| Rastam Mohd Isa | 1994 | 1996 |
| Sallehuddin Abdullah | 1996 | 2000 |
| Sopian Ahmad | 2000 | 2003 |
| Md Hashim Hussein | 2003 | 2005 |
| Ahmad Shahizan Abd Samad | 2007 | 2009 |
| Ahmad Anwar Adnan | 2009 | 2012 |
| Hasrul Sani Mujtabar | 2012 | 2017 |
| Ikram Mohammad Ibrahim | 2018 | 2021 |
| H.E. Amb. Dato' Mohammad Azhar Mazlan | 2023 | Present |

== See also ==
- Malaysia–Pakistan relations
