= Shazelina Zainul Abidin =

Malaysian diplomat

Shazelina Z Abidin, PhD

Malaysian Civil Servant/ Foreign Service Officer
- Incumbent
- Assumed office December 16, 1996

Personal details
- Born: Kuala Lumpur, Malaysia

Shazelina Zainul Abidin is a Malaysian diplomat who is currently the High Commissioner of Malaysia to Canada.

She was previously the Malaysian ambassador to Senegal, with concurrent accreditation to Burkina Faso, Mali, The Gambia and Cabo Verde.

Prior to her stint in Africa, Shazelina was the Head of Communications and Public Diplomacy for the Ministry of Foreign Affairs Malaysia, and has had postings to Washington DC (2001–2003) and to New York, at the Permanent Mission of Malaysia to the United Nations (2007–2011).

Shazelina maintains strong links to the academic world with her appointment as an Honorary Research Fellow at the University of Sheffield.

Shazelina was the Director General of the Institute of Diplomacy and Foreign Relations (IDFR) from 2021 to 2023, returning to the Ministry of Foreign Affairs Malaysia to head the Division of South Asia and Central Asia.

She taught Contemporary US Foreign Politics at the University of Sheffield in 2014 and 2015 and still regularly speaks on a variety of international relations issues and subjects, upon the request of public universities and organisations.

== Education ==
She attended Sekolah Seri Puteri boarding school. She graduated with a B.A. (Hons) from Queen Mary University of London, an M.Sc from the University of Edinburgh and a PhD (without amendments) from the University of Sheffield. She joined the Foreign Ministry in 1996.

== Career ==
In 2009, she was a member of the Malaysian delegation to the United Nations. In 2013, she was on the host committee of the Global Summit of Women.

In 2019, she appeared at a Supdeco conference. In 2022, Shazelina gave the Keynote Address at the Perdana Leadership Foundation's CEO Forum 2022, a forum for Malaysian CEOs inspired by former Prime Minister Mahathir Mohamad.

For her work in Senegal, Shazelina was awarded the prestigious National Order of the Lion at the rank of Commander by the President of the Republic of Senegal, Mr Macky Sall, in 2021.

Shazelina has her own monthly column in the New Straits Times and a blog on diplomacy and diplomatic practices, ofdiplomacy.com .

== Honours ==
- Senegal:
  - Commander of the National Order of the Lion (2021)
- Penang, Malaysia:
  - Officer of the Order of the Defender of State (DSPN) – Dato' (2021)
