= Foreign relations of Malaysia =

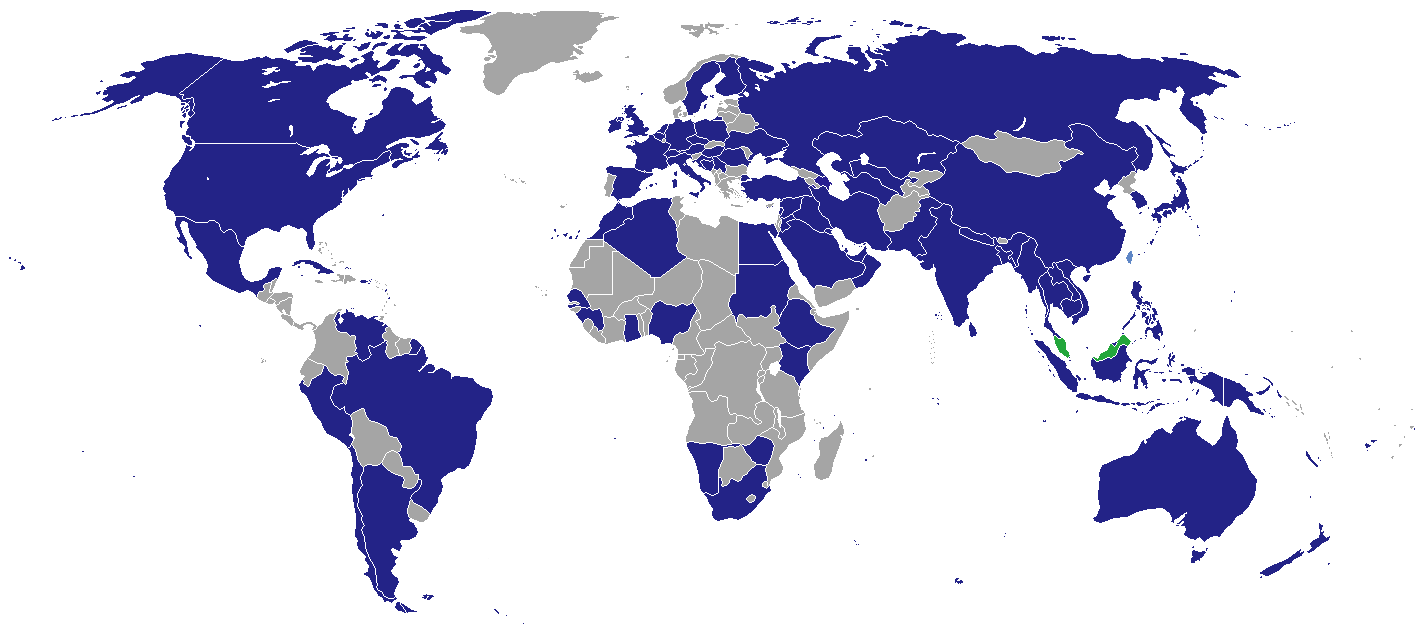
Map of countries with diplomatic missions of Malaysia shown in blue.

Malaysia is an active member of various international organisations, including the Commonwealth of Nations, the United Nations, the Organisation of Islamic Cooperation, and the Non-Aligned Movement. It has also in recent times been an active proponent of regional co-operation.

== Foreign Policy 1957–1969 ==
Malaysia has been a member of the Commonwealth since independence in 1957, when it entered into the Anglo-Malayan Defence Agreement (AMDA) with the United Kingdom whereby Britain guaranteed the defence of Malaya (and later Malaysia). The presence of British and other Commonwealth troops were crucial to Malaysia's security during the Malayan Emergency (1948–1960) and the Indonesian Confrontation (1962–1966), which was sparked by Malaya's merger with the British colonies of Singapore, Sarawak and North Borneo to form Malaysia in 1963.

The British defence guarantee ended following Britain's decision in 1967 to withdraw its forces east of Suez, and was replaced in 1971 with the Five Power Defence Arrangements (FPDA) by which Britain, Australia, New Zealand, Malaysia and Singapore agreed to co-operate in the area of defence, and to "consult" in the event of external aggression or the threat of attack on Malaysia or Singapore. The FPDA continues to operate, and the Five Powers have a permanent Integrated Area Defence System based at RMAF Butterworth, and organise annual naval and air exercises.

Under the leadership of Prime Minister Tunku Abdul Rahman (up to 1970), Malaysia pursued a strongly pro-Commonwealth anti-communist foreign policy. Nonetheless, Malaysia was active in the opposition to apartheid that saw South Africa quit the Commonwealth in 1961, and was a founding member of the Association of Southeast Asian Nations (ASEAN) in 1967 and the Organisation of the Islamic Conference (OIC) in 1969, with the Tunku as its first Secretary-General in 1971.

== Foreign policy since 1969 ==
Under Prime Minister Abdul Razak Hussein, Malaysia shifted its policy towards non-alignment and neutrality. Malaysia's foreign policy is officially based on the principle of neutrality and maintaining peaceful relations with all countries, regardless of their ideology or political system, and to further develop relations with other countries in the region. In 1971, ASEAN issued its neutralist and anti-nuclear Zone of Peace, Freedom and Neutrality (ZOPFAN) Declaration. In the same year, Malaysia joined the Non-Aligned Movement. Consistent with this policy, Malaysia established diplomatic relations with the People's Republic of China in 1974.

This policy shift was continued and strengthened by Prime Minister Mahathir Mohamad, who pursued a regionalist and pro-South policy with at times strident anti-Western rhetoric. He long sought to establish an East Asian Economic Group as an alternative to APEC, excluding Australia, New Zealand and the Americas, and during his premiership Malaysia signed up to an ASEAN Free Trade Area (AFTA) and ASEAN+3, a regional forum with China, Japan and South Korea.

A strong tenet of Malaysia's policy is national sovereignty and the right of a country to control its domestic affairs. Malaysia views regional co-operation as the cornerstone of its foreign policy. It attaches a high priority to the security and stability of Southeast Asia, and has tried to strengthen relations with other Islamic states. Malaysia was a leading advocate of expanding ASEAN's membership to include Laos, Vietnam, and Burma, arguing that "constructive engagement" with these countries, especially Burma, will help bring political and economic changes. Malaysia is also a member of G-15 and G-77 economic groupings.

Despite Mahathir's frequently anti-Western rhetoric, he worked closely with Western countries and led a crackdown against Islamic fundamentalists after the 11 September attacks. The current Minister of Foreign Affairs is Dato' Seri Mohamad Hasan, who assumed office on 12 December 2023, with Lukanisman bin Awang Sauni as deputy minister.

Malaysia has never recognised Israel and has no diplomatic ties with it, with the country ever condemning the Israelis action during their raid over a Gaza humanitarian mission and request the International Criminal Court to take any action against them. Malaysia has stated it will only establish an official relations with Israel once a peace agreement with the State of Palestine been reached and called for both parties to find a quick resolution. Malaysian peacekeeping forces have contributed to many UN peacekeeping missions, such as in Namibia, Cambodia, Bosnia and Herzegovina, Somalia, East Timor and Lebanon. On 29 July 2024, Malaysia officially applied to join the BRICS economic bloc and geopolitical organization.

== International affiliations ==
Malaysia is a founding member of the Association of Southeast Asian Nations (ASEAN) and the Organisation of the Islamic Conference (now the Organisation of Islamic Cooperation). It is also a member of the Non-Aligned Movement. Kuala Lumpur was the site of the first East Asia Summit in 2005, and Malaysia has chaired ASEAN, the OIC, and the NAM in the past. A former British colony, it is also a member of the Commonwealth.

Malaysia is affiliated with the United Nations and many of its specialised agencies, including UNESCO, World Bank, International Monetary Fund, International Atomic Energy Agency; General Agreement on Tariffs and Trade. It is also a member of the Asia-Pacific Economic Cooperation, the Developing 8 Countries. Asian Development Bank, Five-Power Defense Arrangement, G-77, and South Centre. On 31 October 2011 Malaysia became a party to the Antarctic Treaty.

== International disputes ==
The policy towards territorial disputes by the Malaysian government is one of pragmatism, solving disputes in a number of ways, including some resolved in the International Court of Justice.

=== Spratly and other islands in the South China Sea ===
Malaysia has asserted sovereignty over the Spratly Islands together with China, the Philippines, Taiwan, Vietnam, and Brunei. Tensions have eased since 2002 "Declaration on the Conduct of Parties in the South China Sea". However, it is not the legally binding code of conduct sought by some parties. Malaysia was not party to a March 2005 joint accord among the national oil companies of China, the Philippines and Vietnam on conducting marine seismic activities in the Spratly Islands. Malaysia long maintained a low-key approach to the dispute, maintaining positive relations with China due to strong economic ties, a large ethnic Chinese population, and a desire for a balance of power in the region. However, as Chinese fishing vessels and coast guard ships have become increasingly assertive, Malaysia has increased its diplomatic and military responses.

=== Ligitan, Sipadan and Ambalat ===
The ICJ awarded Ligitan and Sipadan islands to Malaysia over Indonesia but left the maritime boundary in the hydrocarbon-rich Celebes Sea in dispute, culminating in hostile confrontations in March 2005 over concessions to the Ambalat oil block.

=== Singapore ===
Singapore was a part of Malaysia for two years (1963–65), but it ultimately was asked by Tunku to secede after increased racial tensions due to the election campaigns in 1964. Today, disputes continue among other things, over the pricing of deliveries of raw untreated water to Singapore, Singapore's land reclamation causing a negative environmental impact in Malaysian waters, a new bridge to replace the Johor–Singapore Causeway which Singapore does not want to pay for, maritime boundaries, the redevelopment of Malayan Railway lands in Singapore and Pedra Branca. Both parties however, agreed to ICJ arbitration on the island dispute. On 24 May 2008, the International Court of Justice ruled that Pedra Branca belonged to Singapore with the nearby Middle Rocks going to Malaysia. Regarding railway land in Singapore, see also Malaysia-Singapore Points of Agreement of 1990. On introducing budget flights between Singapore and Kuala Lumpur, the stumbling block appears to be Malaysia's sympathy towards flag carrier Malaysia Airlines, and preference for the existing near duopoly with Singapore Airlines.

=== The Philippines ===
The Philippines has a dormant claim to eastern Sabah.

=== Brunei ===
Malaysia's land boundary with Brunei around Limbang is no longer in dispute. On 16 March 2009, Brunei announced its decision to drop a long-standing claim to Sarawak's Limbang district. This was the result of the two countries resolving their various land and sea territorial disputes. This issue was resolved along with several other disputes with the sealing and signing of letters of exchange by Abdullah and the Sultan Hassanal Bolkiah of Brunei at Istana Nurul Iman. As of 2010, the two countries are working towards resolving disputes over their maritime boundaries.

=== Thailand ===
According to a source, the areas around Ko Kra and Ko Losin in present-day Thailand are once disputed with Malaysia.

== Diplomatic relations ==
List of countries which Malaysia maintains diplomatic relations with:

#	Country	Date
1	Australia	31 August 1957
2	Cambodia	31 August 1957
3	Canada	31 August 1957
4	Denmark	31 August 1957
5	France	31 August 1957
6	Germany	31 August 1957
7	India	31 August 1957
8	Indonesia	31 August 1957
9	Italy	31 August 1957
10	Japan	31 August 1957
11	Netherlands	31 August 1957
12	Pakistan	31 August 1957
13	Thailand	31 August 1957
14	United Kingdom	31 August 1957
15	United States	31 August 1957
16	New Zealand	25 September 1957
17	Sri Lanka	October 1957
18	Belgium	12 December 1957
19	Luxembourg	1957
20	Saudi Arabia	1957
21	Tunisia	1957
22	Myanmar	1 March 1958
23	Sweden	6 June 1958
24	Syria	1958
25	Brazil	11 August 1959
26	Egypt	10 November 1959
27	Greece	16 November 1959
28	Nepal	1 January 1960
29	South Korea	23 February 1960
30	Somalia	17 December 1960
31	Cyprus	1961
32	Austria	6 August 1962
33	Switzerland	3 January 1963
34	Lebanon	16 July 1963
35	Morocco	1963
36	Philippines	18 May 1964
37	Turkey	17 June 1964
38	Algeria	26 November 1964
39	Nigeria	5 March 1965
40	Sudan	26 March 1965
41	Kuwait	28 March 1965
42	Ethiopia	April 1965
43	Singapore	1 September 1965
44	Kenya	1965
45	Laos	1 July 1966
46	Jordan	13 September 1966
47	Ghana	29 March 1967
48	Russia	3 April 1967
49	Serbia	4 May 1967
50	Spain	12 May 1967
51	Argentina	7 June 1967
52	Norway	8 March 1968
53	Maldives	September 1968
54	Bulgaria	4 January 1969
55	Romania	22 March 1969
56	Hungary	29 December 1969
57	Afghanistan	24 January 1970
58	Iran	16 June 1970
59	Poland	21 June 1971
60	Mongolia	8 September 1971
61	Czech Republic	16 September 1971
62	Fiji	30 January 1972
63	Bangladesh	11 September 1972
64	Vietnam	30 March 1973
65	Iraq	6 April 1973
66	Finland	16 June 1973
—	North Korea (suspended)	30 June 1973
67	Mexico	27 March 1974
68	Libya	22 April 1974
69	China	31 May 1974
70	Qatar	26 June 1974
71	Ireland	12 September 1974
72	Bahrain	25 November 1974
73	Cuba	6 February 1975
74	Malta	8 October 1975
75	Jamaica	28 November 1975
76	Portugal	December 1975
77	Guyana	26 April 1976
78	Trinidad and Tobago	11 June 1976
79	Papua New Guinea	12 July 1976
80	Senegal	1 April 1977
81	Costa Rica	17 April 1977
82	Bolivia	9 May 1977
83	Chile	26 February 1979
84	Albania	24 June 1981
85	Antigua and Barbuda	1981
86	Gambia	1981
87	Kiribati	15 March 1982
88	Mali	21 August 1982
89	Samoa	August 1982
90	Tonga	9 September 1982
91	Guinea	29 September 1982
92	Tanzania	29 September 1982
93	Oman	4 January 1983
94	Solomon Islands	10 January 1983
95	Tuvalu	5 April 1983
96	Vanuatu	5 April 1983
97	United Arab Emirates	23 June 1983
98	Brunei	1 January 1984
99	Yemen	7 April 1986
100	Peru	24 April 1986
101	Mauritius	13 August 1986
102	Venezuela	18 December 1986
103	Eswatini	31 March 1987
104	Seychelles	1 May 1987
105	Colombia	19 August 1987
106	Zimbabwe	25 September 1987
107	Uruguay	5 January 1988
108	Lesotho	31 March 1988
109	Nauru	11 November 1988
—	State of Palestine	12 January 1989
110	Paraguay	17 November 1989
111	Mozambique	1989
112	Zambia	26 February 1990
113	Namibia	21 March 1990
114	Botswana	26 November 1990
115	Sierra Leone	26 January 1991
116	Cameroon	1 March 1991
117	Ivory Coast	7 May 1991
118	Malawi	6 November 1991
119	Estonia	11 February 1992
120	Uzbekistan	21 February 1992
121	Ukraine	3 March 1992
122	Belarus	5 March 1992
123	Tajikistan	11 March 1992
124	Kazakhstan	26 March 1992
125	Kyrgyzstan	2 April 1992
126	Barbados	10 April 1992
—	Cook Islands	2 May 1992
127	Croatia	4 May 1992
128	Slovenia	4 May 1992
129	Turkmenistan	17 May 1992
130	Federated States of Micronesia	6 July 1992
131	Saint Kitts and Nevis	30 July 1992
132	Saint Lucia	9 October 1992
133	Bosnia and Herzegovina	5 December 1992
134	Slovakia	1 January 1993
135	Marshall Islands	4 January 1993
136	Guatemala	27 January 1993
137	Nicaragua	17 February 1993
138	Moldova	10 March 1993
139	Armenia	11 March 1993
140	Azerbaijan	5 April 1993
141	Georgia	7 May 1993
142	Latvia	12 June 1993
143	Suriname	2 July 1993
144	North Macedonia	22 July 1993
145	Panama	24 July 1993
146	South Africa	8 November 1993
147	Lithuania	9 March 1994
148	Ecuador	29 August 1994
149	Burkina Faso	4 January 1995
150	Benin	30 January 1995
151	Madagascar	6 April 1995
152	Cape Verde	19 January 1996
—	Niue	30 January 1996
153	Burundi	1996
154	Eritrea	2 December 1997
155	Democratic Republic of the Congo	1997
156	Liberia	1997
157	El Salvador	June 1998
158	Djibouti	3 August 1998
159	Uganda	8 December 1998
160	Belize	11 February 2000
161	Iceland	4 April 2000
162	Central African Republic	2000
163	Comoros	2000
164	Guinea-Bissau	2000
165	Angola	June 2001
166	Equatorial Guinea	November 2001
167	Dominican Republic	2001
168	Bahamas	2001
169	Gabon	2001
170	Haiti	2001
171	Republic of the Congo	2001
172	Timor-Leste	20 May 2002
173	Mauritania	2003
174	San Marino	29 January 2004
175	Liechtenstein	July 2004
176	Rwanda	1 August 2005
177	Palau	5 October 2005
178	Montenegro	17 August 2006
179	Monaco	22 May 2007
180	Togo	20 August 2008
181	Saint Vincent and the Grenadines	11 November 2008
182	Grenada	3 February 2009
—	Kosovo	18 March 2011
—	Holy See	27 July 2011
183	Niger	24 April 2012
184	Honduras	7 August 2013
185	Dominica	19 January 2015
186	São Tomé and Príncipe	9 April 2015
187	South Sudan	20 March 2024
188	Andorra	25 September 2024
189	Chad	25 June 2025

== Bilateral relations ==
=== ASEAN ===
Country	Formal relations began	Notes
Brunei	1 January 1984	Main article: Brunei–Malaysia relations See also: Brunei–Malaysia border Brunei has a High Commission in Kuala Lumpur, and consulates in Kota Kinabalu and Kuching. Malaysia maintains a high commission in Bandar Seri Begawan. Both countries are full members of the Commonwealth of Nations. The states of Sarawak and Sabah in East Malaysia are connected to Brunei via the Pan Borneo Highway. Brunei has denounced its claims on Limbang and recognises Malaysia's full sovereignty. In 2003, Brunei and Malaysia ceased gas and oil exploration in their disputed offshore and deep water seabeds and negotiations have stalemated prompting consideration of international adjudication.
Cambodia	31 August 1957	Main article: Cambodia–Malaysia relations More than 24,000 Cambodians visited Malaysia since the first half of 2012, while Malaysian visited to Cambodia numbered 54,000. In 2011, bilateral trade between the two countries worth over US$319.5 million and in 2010 Malaysia were consider as one of the biggest investors in the country with the total investments were U$2.19 billion while Malaysian investments in Cambodia during the past two years totalling U$118 million.
Indonesia	31 August 1957, severed diplomatic relations 15 September 1963, restored 31 August 1967	Main article: Indonesia–Malaysia relations See also: Indonesia–Malaysia border: Indonesia has an embassy in Kuala Lumpur, and consulates in George Town, Johor Bahru, Kota Kinabalu and Kuching. Malaysia has an embassy in Jakarta and a consulate general in Medan and Pekanbaru.; Relations between the two nations deteriorated under Indonesian President Sukarno prior to the Indonesia–Malaysia confrontation, but was returned to normal under President Suharto.; Currently, both nations are in territorial disputes over the oil rich area of Ambalat east of Borneo and over Tanjung Datu as well as Camar Bulan near the Sarawak-West Kalimantan border.; Both nations are founding members of ASEAN and APEC.; Both countries are descendants of the British and Dutch influence as prior to the Anglo-Dutch Treaty, both Indonesia and Malaysia are part of the Malay Archipelago with both the Indonesian and Malaysian languages came from the Malay language.; Although both countries frequently involved in many disputes, both share a strong relations due to some similarity in their language and close ethnic relations.
Laos	1 July 1966	Main article: Laos–Malaysia relations During the collapse of the Communist bloc, the Soviet Union could no longer afford aid for the development of Laos. This made Laos seek aid from other countries to help develop their country and has led the country to adopt a neutral foreign policy. When this policy of neutrality was adopted, relations with Malaysia were established.
Myanmar	1 March 1958	Main article: Malaysia–Myanmar relations Myanmar has an embassy in Kuala Lumpur. Relations between the two countries were established on 1 March 1957 and the first Burmese mission at the legation level was set up in Kuala Lumpur in June 1959 and later raised to the embassy level.
Philippines	October 1959, severed 16 September 1963, restored 18 May 1964, severed 29 November 1968, restored 16 December 1969	Main article: Malaysia–Philippines relations See also: Malaysia–Philippines border: The Philippines has an embassy in Kuala Lumpur.; Malaysia has an embassy in Manila.; Despite religious differences (the former is mostly Muslim, while the latter is predominantly Roman Catholic). Malaysia and the Philippines share a one-of-a-kind relationship rooted on the basis of geography, ethnicity, and political aspirations.; Both countries are members of the Asian Union.; The countries are both involved in ongoing disputes over ownership of the Spratly Islands and the Philippines has a claim on the eastern Sabah in northern Borneo though this is currently not being actively pursued.
Singapore	1 September 1965	Main article: Malaysia–Singapore relations See also: Malaysia–Singapore border Singapore has a High Commission in Kuala Lumpur and a Consulate in Johor Bahru, Malaysia and Malaysia has a High Commission in Singapore. Both countries are full members of the Commonwealth of Nations. See also Malaysia-Singapore border, Pedra Branca dispute
Thailand	31 August 1957	Main article: Malaysia–Thailand relations See also: Malaysia–Thailand border Thailand has an embassy in Kuala Lumpur, and consulates in George Town and Kota Bharu. Malaysia maintains an embassy in Bangkok. Recently, Thai–Malay relations have soured considerably due to the ethnically-Malay Pattani separatists in three southern provinces of Thailand.
Vietnam	30 March 1973	Main article: Malaysia–Vietnam relations See also: Malaysia–Vietnam border: Vietnam has an embassy in Kuala Lumpur.; Malaysia has an embassy in Hanoi.; Malaysia forged diplomatic ties with the modern-day Vietnamese state in March 1973 which have lasted until today. Relations between two countries were frosty in the late 1970s and 1980s as a result of the Cambodian–Vietnamese War and the influx of Vietnamese boat people into Malaysia. The subsequent resolution of these issues in the late 1980s saw the cultivation of strong trade and economic ties, and bilateral trade between both countries grew exponentially in the 1990s. and later expanded to other areas of major co-operation including information technology, education and defence in the 2000s.

=== East Asia ===
Country	Formal relations began	Notes
China	31 May 1974	Main article: China–Malaysia relations China has an embassy in Kuala Lumpur, and consulates in George Town, Kota Kinabalu and Kuching. Malaysia maintains an embassy in Beijing, and consulates in Shanghai, Guangzhou, Xi'an, Nanning and Guilin. Diplomatic relations were established in 1974. Following the end of the Cold War, diplomatic foreign relations between China and Malaysia immediately turned positive. Although issues arose from China's activities in the South China Sea, the political and cultural connections between the two nations strengthened. Both countries are full members of APEC, and there is a sizeable population of Chinese in Malaysia.
Hong Kong (Special Administrative Region of China)	2 July 1971	Main article: Hong Kong–Malaysia relations Hong Kong enjoys significant autonomy in economic, trade, financial and monetary matters. Currently, Malaysia has a consulate general office in Wan Chai and the relations are mostly based on economic co-operation.
Japan	31 August 1957	Main article: Japan–Malaysia relations Japan has an embassy in Kuala Lumpur, and consulates in George Town and Kota Kinabalu. Malaysia maintains an embassy in Tokyo. Bilateral economic trades between Malaysia and Japan have increased. In 2011, total trade between both countries was at MYR145.3 billion. Japan has increased its import of liquefied natural gas to about 34%. Before 2007, the bilateral rate between both countries were at a deficit. About 1,400 Japanese companies are operating in Malaysia creating more than 11,000 job opportunities. Halal certification endorsement by the Malaysian government has allowed Malaysian companies in the halal food industry to compete well in the Japanese market. The building of a halal park in Japan is also considered.
North Korea	30 June 1973, diplomatic relations was severed 19 March 2021	Main article: Malaysia–North Korea relations North Korea maintained friendly diplomatic ties with Malaysia. In an effort to boost tourism between the two countries, North Korea announced that Malaysians will not require a visa to visit North Korea. North Korea's flag carrier, Air Koryo has regular flights to Kuala Lumpur. Recently, Malaysia's Bernama News Agency reported that the two countries will enhance co-operation in information-related areas. North Korea maintains an embassy in Kuala Lumpur while Malaysia has an embassy in Pyongyang. After the assassination of Kim Jong-nam due to poisoning at Kuala Lumpur International Airport in February 2017 allegedly under the orders of the North Korean leader and his half-brother Kim Jong-un, relations between both countries steadily worsened, and as a response Malaysia gradually withdrew its ambassador from North Korea, cancelled the visa-free entry for North Koreans for security reasons, and decided to expel the North Korean ambassador. On 19 March 2021, North Korea severed diplomatic relations with Malaysia after the Kuala Lumpur High Court rejected North Korean businessman Mun Chol Myong's appeal against extradition to the United States on money laundering charges. In response, the Malaysian Government defended the Malaysian judicial process and ordered the closure of the North Korean Embassy and expulsion of North Korean diplomats and their dependents.
South Korea	23 February 1960	Main article: Malaysia–South Korea relations The two countries established relations in 1960. South Korean president Lee Myung-bak was in Kuala Lumpur from 9–10 December 2010 for a two-day visit to commemorate the 50th anniversary of diplomatic ties between Malaysia and South Korea.
Mongolia	8 September 1971	Main article: Malaysia–Mongolia relations Malaysia has an honorary consulate in Ulaanbaatar, and Mongolia honorary consulate in Bangkok was accredited to Malaysia. However, since 2006, Mongolia has not presented any ambassador to Malaysia for seven years due to the murder of a Mongolian citizen on the country, but later decided to appointing an ambassador in 2014.
Taiwan	early 1960s	Main article: Malaysia–Taiwan relations Economic and cultural relations are still maintained with Malaysia which has a trade centre office in Taipei, and Taiwan has an economic and cultural centre in Kuala Lumpur.

=== Middle East ===
Country	Formal relations began	Notes
Bahrain	25 November 1974	Both countries established diplomatic relations on 25 November 1974 Main article: Bahrain–Malaysia relations Bahrain has an embassy in Kuala Lumpur, and Malaysia has an embassy in Manama.
Egypt	10 September 1957	Main article: Egypt–Malaysia relations: Egypt has an embassy in Kuala Lumpur.; Malaysia has an embassy in Cairo.
Iran	7 October 1966	Main article: Iran–Malaysia relations Diplomatic relations between Iran and Malaysia are brotherly and cooperative, with Iran having its embassy in Kuala Lumpur and Malaysia having its embassy in Tehran. The two countries are members of the Organisation of Islamic Cooperation and the D8. The Economic trade between Iran and Malaysia is quite sturdy as well, amounting to US$1.43 billion as of 2008.
Israel	None	Main article: Israel–Malaysia relations Despite initial contact after the independence of Malaysia, no diplomatic relations were made. Malaysia consistently rejected relations with Israel as it tried to increase its relations with Arab states and shore up support for its conflict with Indonesia. Malaysia officially declared it did not recognise Israel in 1966. Relations ceased to exist until the 1990s, when limited economic ties were made, although diplomatic ties were explicitly rejected. Malaysia has stated it will open ties with Israel once a final solution been reach with the State of Palestine.
Jordan	January 1966	Main article: Jordan–Malaysia relations Jordan has an embassy in Kuala Lumpur, and Malaysia has an embassy in Amman. Relations between the two countries are mainly in economic and Islamic affairs.
Kuwait	28 March 1965	Both countries established diplomatic relations on 28 March 1965 Main article: Kuwait–Malaysia relations Kuwait has an embassy in Kuala Lumpur, and Malaysia has an embassy in Kuwait City. Relations are mainly in economic co-operation.
Lebanon	1965	Main article: Lebanon–Malaysia relations Lebanon has an embassy in Kuala Lumpur, and Malaysia has an embassy in Beirut.
Oman	15 January 1982	Main article: Malaysia–Oman relations Oman and Malaysia signed an agreement for Oman to import frozen chicken from Malaysia, costing 120 million Malaysian ringgit. Oman imports most of its food, up to 80%.
Palestine		Main article: Malaysia–Palestine relations Palestine has an embassy in Kuala Lumpur. Malaysia is a supporter of the Palestinian bid for UN membership.
Qatar	1974	Main article: Malaysia–Qatar relations Malaysia has an embassy in Doha, and Qatar has an embassy in Kuala Lumpur.
Saudi Arabia	1957	Main article: Malaysia–Saudi Arabia relations Saudi Arabia has an embassy in Kuala Lumpur, and Malaysia has an embassy in Riyadh. Relations, both diplomatic and economic, are quite close between the two Muslim-majority OIC members. Additionally, there is a sizeable population of Malaysian migrant workers in Saudi Arabia.
Syria	1958	Main article: Malaysia–Syria relations Syria has an embassy in Kuala Lumpur, and Malaysia has an embassy in Damascus. Syria and Malaysia negotiated over a $30 billion worth of contracts over Malaysian companies building infrastructure in Syria.
Turkey	17 June 1964	See Malaysia–Turkey relations: Malaysia has an embassy in Ankara and a consulate-general in Istanbul.; Turkey has an embassy in Kuala Lumpur.; Both countries are members of D-8, OIC and WTO.; Trade volume between the two countries was US$1.70 billion in 2015 (Malaysian exports/imports: 1.34/0.36 billion USD).; Yunus Emre Institute has a local headquarters in Kuala Lumpur.
United Arab Emirates	1974	Main article: Malaysia–United Arab Emirates relations United Arab Emirates has an embassy in Kuala Lumpur, and Malaysia has an embassy in Abu Dhabi.
Yemen		Main article: Malaysia–Yemen relations Malaysia has an embassy in Sanaa, and Yemen has an embassy in Kuala Lumpur.

=== South Asia ===
Country	Formal relations began	Notes
Bangladesh	11 September 1972	Main article: Bangladesh–Malaysia relations: Bangladesh has a High Commission in Kuala Lumpur.; Malaysia has a High Commission in Dhaka.; Both countries are full members of the Commonwealth of Nations.; Both countries are members of the OIC, the Asia Cooperation Dialogue.; Malaysia was one of the first countries to recognise Bangladesh's independence in 1971.; There were approximately 500,000 Bangladeshis in Malaysia as of 2009.
India	8 October 1957	Main article: India–Malaysia relations: India has a high commission in Kuala Lumpur, and Malaysia has a high commission in New Delhi.; Both countries are full members of the Commonwealth of Nations, and the Asian Union.; India and Malaysia are also connected by various cultural and historical ties that date back to antiquity.; The two countries are on excellently friendly terms with each other seeing as Malaysia is home to great number of Indians who have become naturalised.; Prime Minister Najib Razak made his official trip to India in January 2010.; Indian Prime Minister Dr Manmohan Singh made a three-day official visit in November 2010.
Maldives	1968	Main article: Malaysia–Maldives relations Malaysia's High Commission in Colombo is also accredited to the Maldives, and Maldives has a High Commission in Kuala Lumpur.
Nepal	1 January 1960	Main article: Malaysia–Nepal relations Malaysia has an embassy in Kathmandu, and Nepal has an embassy in Kuala Lumpur. Both countries established diplomatic relations on 1 January 1960, with bilateral relations between Malaysia and Nepal have developed from historic grounds.
Pakistan	1957	Main article: Malaysia–Pakistan relations Pakistan has its High Commission in Kuala Lumpur, and Malaysia has its High Commission in Islamabad. Pakistan has strong brotherly relations with Malaysia. Both are members of Organisation of Islamic Cooperation (OIC) and the Commonwealth of Nations. There is a trade and cultural pact between the two countries, under which the import and export of various goods is done on fairly large scale. The President and the Prime Minister of Pakistan along with other high officials visited Malaysia many times and Malaysian officials also paid a good will visit to Pakistan. Both countries enjoy close relations and military links of mutual friendship and the co-operation has further strengthened. Since the independence of Malaysia, Pakistan has supported the re-unification of Singapore, Pattani and Brunei as integral part of Kuala Lumpur's administration; it also considers the Riau Islands as part of the Malayan Federation since its independence in 1957. Pakistan and Malaysia are linked by air transport. Pakistan International Airlines and Malaysia Airlines operate many weekly flights between Karachi and Kuala Lumpur. Both Malaysia and Pakistan were a part of the South east Asian version of NATO called SEATO also known as a 'mutual defence pact'.
Sri Lanka	October 1957	Main article: Malaysia–Sri Lanka relations Malaysia has a High Commission in Colombo, and Sri Lanka has a High Commission in Kuala Lumpur. Diplomatic relations have been established since 1957. President Chandrika Kumaratunga made a state visit in 1997 and several memorandum of understanding (MoU) were signed during the meeting.

=== Other parts of Asia ===
Country	Formal relations began	Notes
Azerbaijan	5 April 1993	Main article: Azerbaijan–Malaysia relations: Azerbaijan has an embassy in Kuala Lumpur, and Malaysia has an embassy in Baku.; Malaysia recognized the independence of the Republic of Azerbaijan on 31 December 1991 and on 5 April 1993 diplomatic relations were established.
East Timor	20 May 2002	Main article: East Timor–Malaysia relations East Timor has an embassy in Kuala Lumpur, and Malaysia has an embassy in Dili. Since 1999, Malaysia has contributed to many UN peacekeeping missions on the country, such as one are the Operation Astute during the 2006 East Timorese crisis. Malaysia also has provided assistance to East Timor in the area of human resources development through various training programmes and providing assistance to East Timor in its nation building efforts.
Kazakhstan	16 March 1992	Main article: Kazakhstan–Malaysia relations Kazakhstan has an embassy in Kuala Lumpur while Malaysia has an embassy in Astana. Both are members of Organisation of Islamic Cooperation (OIC).
Kyrgyzstan	26 March 1992	Main article: Kyrgyzstan–Malaysia relations: Kyrgyzstan has an embassy in Kuala Lumpur.; Malaysia embassy in Tashkent is also accredited to Kyrgyzstan.
Tajikistan	11 March 1992	Main article: Malaysia–Tajikistan relations: Tajikistan embassy in Putrajaya is currently under construction.; Both countries have been enjoying warm diplomatic relations since relations were established on 11 March 1992, and are willing to make constructive efforts towards progress.
Turkmenistan	17 May 1992	Main article: Malaysia–Turkmenistan relations: Malaysia has an embassy in Ashgabat.; Turkmenistan has an embassy in Kuala Lumpur.
Uzbekistan	21 February 1992	Main article: Malaysia–Uzbekistan relations: Malaysia has an embassy in Tashkent.; Uzbekistan has an embassy in Ampang, Selangor.

=== Europe ===
Country	Formal relations began	Notes
Albania	23 June 1981	See also: Foreign relations of Albania: Albania had an embassy in Kuala Lumpur, but it has since closed.
Armenia	11 March 1993	See Foreign relations of Armenia: Armenia is represented in Malaysia through its embassy in New Delhi (India).; Malaysia is represented in Armenia through its embassy in Moscow (Russia).
Austria	6 August 1962	Main article: Austria–Malaysia relations Austria has an embassy in Kuala Lumpur, and Malaysia has an embassy in Vienna. Malaysia is one of Austria's most important trading partners in Southeast Asia. In 2003, Austrian exports to Malaysia, covering a wide range of products such as machinery and components, especially electrical machinery and parts thereof, paper, paperboard, telecommunication equipment and medical and pharmaceutical products, declined by 10.8% to 82.6 million. Malaysian imports to Austria, consisting mainly of one product group, namely electronic and electrical goods, especially semiconductors, reduced by half to 236.4 million. In Kuala Lumpur, the Austrian Trade office offers support to Austrian and Malaysian companies to assist them in forging new partnerships. Austrian President Heinz Fischer made a state visit to Malaysia on 7–9 November 2010, visiting Kuala Lumpur and Malacca Town.
Belarus	5 March 1992	Main article: Belarus–Malaysia relations: The Belarusian embassy in Jakarta is accredited to Malaysia.; Both countries are members of the Non-Aligned Movement.
Belgium	1957	Main article: Belgium–Malaysia relations Belgium has an embassy in Kuala Lumpur, and Malaysia has an embassy in Brussels.
Bosnia and Herzegovina	5 December 1992	Main article: Bosnia and Herzegovina–Malaysia relations: Bosnia and Herzegovina has an embassy in Kuala Lumpur.; Malaysia has an embassy in Sarajevo.
Croatia	4 May 1992	Main article: Croatia–Malaysia relations Croatia has an embassy in Kuala Lumpur, and Malaysia has an embassy in Zagreb.
Czech Republic	16 September 1971 and 1 January 1993	Main article: Czech Republic–Malaysia relations: Czech Republic has an embassy in Kuala Lumpur.; Malaysia has an embassy in Prague.; Following the establishment of relations with the Soviet Union on 3 April 1967, Malaysia also expanded its relations with then Czechoslovakia (1971) and other Eastern European countries.
Denmark	7 September 1958	Main article: Denmark–Malaysia relations Denmark has an embassy in Kuala Lumpur, and Malaysia is represented in Denmark, through its embassy in Stockholm, Sweden.
Estonia	11 February 1992 and 4 November 1993	See Foreign relations of Estonia: Estonia has an honorary consul in Kuala Lumpur.; Malaysia embassy in Helsinki is accredited to Estonia.; Malaysia has recognised the independence of Estonia on 11 September 1991 shortly after the dissolution of Estonian Soviet Socialist Republic on 20 August 1991. While the relations between the two countries has been established since 4 November 1993.
European Union		Main article: Malaysia–European Union relations The relations started with the 1980 European Commission–ASEAN Agreement and were developed since the formation of European Economic Community (EEC) in 1957. In 2011, Malaysia is the European Union second largest trading partner in Southeast Asia after Singapore and the 23rd largest trading partner for the European Union in the world, while the European Union is Malaysia's 4th largest trading partner.
Finland	17 November 1972	Main article: Finland–Malaysia relations: Finland has an embassy in Kuala Lumpur.; Malaysia has an embassy in Helsinki.
France	31 August 1957	Main article: France–Malaysia relations: France has an embassy in Kuala Lumpur.; Malaysia has an embassy in Paris.
Georgia	7 May 1993	See Foreign relations of Georgia: Georgia is represented in Malaysia through its embassy in Beijing (China).; Malaysia is represented in Georgia through its embassy in Kyiv (Ukraine).
Germany	23 September 1957	Main article: Germany–Malaysia relations Germany has an embassy in Kuala Lumpur, and Malaysia has an embassy in Berlin.
Greece	16 November 1959	Main article: Greece–Malaysia relations: The Greek embassy in Jakarta, Indonesia, is also accredited to Malaysia. In the opposite way, the Malaysian embassy in Berlin is at the same time accredited to Greece. There is an Honorary Greek Consulate in Kuala Lumpur and there is a Malaysian honorary consulate in Athens.; Greece exports specialised machinery, non-ferrous metals, tobacco, metal goods, medical products, minerals and fruit, and imports industrial equipment, oil, footwear, paper, rubber, vehicles and telecommunications equipment from Malaysia.
Holy See	27 July 2011	Main article: Holy See–Malaysia relations: The Holy See has a Nunciature in Kuala Lumpur; Malaysia is represented to the Holy See by a non-residential ambassador, who resides in Bern (Switzerland).; In 2002 Prime Minister Mahathir Mohamad visited the Vatican to meet Pope John Paul II.; Apostolic Delegation to Malaysia
Hungary	29 December 1969	Both countries established diplomatic relations on 29 December 1969 Main article: Hungary–Malaysia relations: Hungary has an embassy in Kuala Lumpur.; Malaysia has an embassy in Budapest.; Malaysia Ministry of Foreign Affairs about the relation with Hungary; Hungary–Malaysia relations on www.kln.gov.my
Italy	1957	Main article: Italy–Malaysia relations: Italy has an embassy in Kuala Lumpur.; Malaysia has an embassy in Rome.
Kosovo	23 March 2011	Main article: Kosovo–Malaysia relations Formal relations between the two countries first began in 2000, when Malaysia became the first Asian country to establish a liaison office in Kosovo. Kosovo unilaterally declared its independence from Serbia on 17 February 2008 and Malaysia recognised it on 30 October 2008. Since that time, Malaysia has pledged assistance to Kosovo in several areas.
Latvia	12 June 1993	Latvia doesn't have any embassy in Malaysia. while Malaysian embassy in Helsinki is accredited to Latvia.
Lithuania	9 March 1994	Main article: Lithuania–Malaysia relations Lithuania has an honorary consulate in Kuala Lumpur, while Malaysia embassy in Stockholm were also accredited to Lithuania.
Netherlands	31 August 1957	Main article: Malaysia–Netherlands relations Netherlands has an embassy in Kuala Lumpur, and Malaysia has an embassy in The Hague. The Dutch established relations with the Sultanate of Johor in the early 17th century, and in 1641 they captured the Portuguese colony of Malacca (on the south-western coast of today's Peninsular Malaysia). With a long interruption during the Napoleonic Wars, the Dutch Malacca era lasted until 1824. In the 20th century, the Netherlands established diplomatic relations with Malaysia soon after the Asian state became independent. The erudite Dutch Sinologist and author Robert van Gulik (who was raised in the former Dutch East Indies himself) served as the ambassador of the Netherlands in Kuala Lumpur in the early 1960s. During his diplomatic service there he became closely acquainted with Malaysia's gibbons (he kept a few in his ambassadorial residence) and became sufficiently interested in this ape species to start the study of its role in ancient Chinese culture, the results of which he later published in his last book (Gibbon in China).
Norway	8 March 1968	Main article: Malaysia–Norway relations: Malaysia has a consulate in Oslo, while Norway has an embassy in Kuala Lumpur.
Poland	21 June 1971	Main article: Malaysia–Poland relations Malaysia has an embassy in Warsaw, and Poland has an embassy in Kuala Lumpur and a consulate in Kuching.
Romania	22 March 1969	Main article: Malaysia–Romania relations Malaysia has an embassy in Bucharest. Romania has an embassy in Kuala Lumpur.
Russia	3 April 1967 (as Soviet Union)	Main article: Malaysia–Russia relations Russia has an embassy in Kuala Lumpur, and Malaysia has an embassy in Moscow.
Serbia	7 May 1967, severed diplomatic relations 12 August 1992, restored 23 January 2003	See Foreign relations of Serbia Entry to Malaysia was refused to all Serbian passport holders until 2007, unless they were in possession of a letter of approval from Malaysian Ministry of Home Affairs. During the time, citizens of Serbia and Montenegro were banned from participating in Malaysia My Second Home program. However, in August 2008, senior officials of Serbia and Malaysia held their first diplomatic meeting since 1991. Afterwards, Foreign Minister Vuk Jeremić said that establishing an embassy in Malaysia was a possibility, bilateral agreements between the two nations would be signed, and Malaysia has removed all visa restrictions for Serbian citizens. This meant that now only the citizens of Israel were banned from participating in Malaysia My Second Home program. Currently, Malaysia has an embassy in Belgrade while Serbian embassy in Jakarta was also accredited to Malaysia.
Spain	12 May 1967	Main article: Malaysia–Spain relations Malaysia has an embassy in Madrid, and Spain has an embassy in Kuala Lumpur. Spain established a diplomatic relations with Malaysia on 12 May 1967 with both the Malaysian and Spanish embassy were opened in 1985.
Sweden	1958	Main article: Malaysia–Sweden relations Diplomatic relations were established in 1958. Sweden has an embassy in Kuala Lumpur, and Malaysia has an embassy in Stockholm. As of 2009, 90 Swedish companies are present in Malaysia and about 450 Swedish citizens live in Malaysia.
Switzerland	10 September 1963	Main article: Malaysia–Switzerland relations Switzerland has an embassy in Kuala Lumpur, and Malaysia has an embassy in Bern. The diplomatic relations has been established since 1963.
Ukraine	3 March 1992	Main article: Malaysia–Ukraine relations: Malaysia has an embassy in Kyiv.; Ukraine has an embassy in Kuala Lumpur and honorary consulate in Penang
United Kingdom	31 August 1957	Main article: Malaysia–United Kingdom relations The Yang di-Pertuan Agong in a carriage with Queen Elizabeth II of the United Kingdom on the state visit to London, 1974 Malaysia established diplomatic relations with the United Kingdom on 31 August 1957.: Malaysia maintains a high commission in London.; The United Kingdom is accredited to the Malaysia through its high commission in Kuala Lumpur.; The UK governed the Malaysia from 1826 to 1942 and 1945 to 1957, when it achieved full independence. Both countries share common membership of the Commonwealth, CPTPP, the Five Power Defence Arrangements, and the World Trade Organization. Bilaterally the two countries have a Double Taxation Agreement, and an Investment Agreement.

=== Americas ===
Country	Formal relations began	Notes
Argentina	7 June 1967	Main article: Argentina–Malaysia relations Argentina has an embassy in Kuala Lumpur, and Malaysia has an embassy in Buenos Aires. Argentina established diplomatic relations with Malaysia on 7 June 1967.
Belize	11 February 2000	Both countries established diplomatic relations on 11 February 2000.; Both countries are full members of Commonwealth of Nations.
Brazil	1959	Main article: Brazil–Malaysia relations: Brazil has an embassy in Kuala Lumpur.; Malaysia has an embassy in Brasília.
Canada	1957	Main article: Canada–Malaysia relations Canada has a High Commission in Kuala Lumpur, and Malaysia has a High Commission in Ottawa. Both countries are full members of the Commonwealth of Nations. Canada's trade relationship with Malaysia includes commerce across several sectors.
Chile	22 May 1979	Main article: Chile–Malaysia relations The Chile–Malaysia relations is mainly based on trade. In 2009, the total trade between Chile and Malaysia is $336 million with the total Malaysian export to Chile were $16.8 million while the import with $148.7 million.
Colombia	19 August 1987	Both countries established diplomatic relations on 19 August 1987 Main article: Colombia–Malaysia relations Both are the members of United Nations, Movement of Non-Aligned Cooperation Forum Asia-Latin America (FEALAC) and Pacific Economic Cooperation Council (PECC).: Colombia has an embassy in Kuala Lumpur.; Malaysia is accredited to Colombia from its embassy in Lima, Peru.
Cuba	6 February 1975	Main article: Cuba–Malaysia relations Malaysia has an embassy in Havana, while Cuba has an embassy in Kuala Lumpur.
Dominica	19 January 2015	Malaysia is represented in Dominica by its embassy in Caracas, Venezuela.; Both countries are full members of the Commonwealth of Nations.
Ecuador	1989	Main article: Ecuador–Malaysia relations Their relations covers on political, commercial, cultural and social activities.
Grenada		Malaysia is represented in Grenada by its embassy in Caracas, Venezuela.; Both countries are full members of the Commonwealth of Nations.
Guyana	26 April 1976	Both countries established diplomatic relations on April 26, 1976.; Both countries are full members of the Commonwealth of Nations.
Jamaica	28 November 1975	Further information: Jamaica–Malaysia relations In 2006, Prime Minister, Portia Simpson Miller and Prime Minister of Malaysia, Dato Seri Abdullah Ahmad Badawi, have expressed satisfaction with the progress of bilateral relations between the two countries and have reaffirmed their commitment to strengthening these relations through the exchange of visits and co-operation in the economic, technological, shipping, health and educational sectors, among other areas.
Mexico	27 March 1974	Main article: Malaysia–Mexico relations Malaysia has an embassy in Mexico City, and Mexico has an embassy in Kuala Lumpur. Relations between the two countries was established on 27 March 1974.
Peru	24 April 1986	Main article: Malaysia–Peru relations Malaysia is one of the main destination for Peruvian exports with the total trade in 2012 records $235 million. Peruvian exports to Malaysia total around $28 million while Malaysian exports with $207 million. In 1995, an agreement on mutual promotion and protection of investments has been signed between the two countries.: Peru has an embassy in Kuala Lumpur.; Malaysia has an embassy in Lima.
United States	31 August 1957	Both countries established diplomatic relations on 31 August 1957 Main article: Malaysia–United States relations Economic ties are robust. The United States is Malaysia's largest trading partner and Malaysia is the tenth-largest trading partner of the US Annual two-way trade amounts to $49 billion. The United States and Malaysia launched negotiations for a bilateral free trade agreement (FTA) in June 2006. President Barack Obama visited Malaysia between 26 and 28 April 2014, as part of his four-nation Asia tour. This visit was the first visit by a sitting US president in almost 50 years since President Lyndon Johnson in 1966. Other top US government officials have made visits to Malaysia in the past, such as then Secretary of State Hillary Clinton in November 2010, Secretary of Defense Chuck Hagel in August 2013, and Secretary of State John Kerry in October 2013. Malaysia has its embassy in Washington, DC with consulates in New York City, NY and Los Angeles, CA and a permanent mission to the United Nations in New York. The United States has its embassy in Kuala Lumpur, Malaysia.
Venezuela	18 December 1986	Both countries established diplomatic relations on 18 December 1986 Main article: Malaysia–Venezuela relations Malaysia has an embassy in Caracas while Venezuela has an embassy in Kuala Lumpur. Both countries are full members of the Group of 77.

=== Oceania ===
Country	Formal relations began	Notes
Australia	31 August 1957	Main article: Australia–Malaysia relations: Australia has a High Commission in Kuala Lumpur.; Malaysia has a High Commission in Canberra and consulates in Melbourne, Sydney and Perth.; Both countries are full members of the Commonwealth of Nations.; Both Australia and Malaysia are members of the Five Power Defence Arrangement and often participate in military exercises together.
Fiji	22 May 1972	Main article: Fiji–Malaysia relations: Fiji has a High Commission in Kuala Lumpur.; Malaysia has a high Commission in Suva.; Both countries were part of the British Empire and has a long-standing relations due to many Fijian soldiers served in Peninsular Malaysia during the Malayan Emergency from 1952 to 1956.
New Zealand	25 September 1957	Both countries established diplomatic relations on 25 September 1957 Main article: Malaysia–New Zealand relations New Zealand has a High Commission in Kuala Lumpur, and Malaysia has a High Commission in Wellington. Both countries are full members of the Commonwealth of Nations.
Solomon Islands	10 May 1983	Main article: Malaysia–Solomon Islands relations Malaysia has an honorary consul in Solomon Islands while Malaysia's High Commission in Port Moresby also accredited to the country, and Solomon Islands has a high commission in Kuala Lumpur.

=== Africa ===
Country	Formal relations began	Notes
Algeria	26 November 1964	Main article: Algeria–Malaysia relations Algeria has an embassy in Kuala Lumpur, and Malaysia has an embassy in Algiers.
Ethiopia	1965	Main article: Ethiopia–Malaysia relations Ethiopia has a consulate-general in Kuala Lumpur, while Malaysia has no embassy in Ethiopia. Malaysia is one of the major trade partner and also one of the largest investors in Ethiopia.
Ghana	5 December 1966	Main article: Ghana–Malaysia relations Ghana has a High Commission in Kuala Lumpur, and Malaysia has a High Commission in Accra.
Kenya	1965	Main article: Kenya–Malaysia relations Kenya has maintained a High Commission in Kuala Lumpur since in 1996. Malaysia opened a High Commission in Nairobi in 2005.
Libya	9 November 1973	Main article: Libya–Malaysia relations Libya has an embassy in Kuala Lumpur, and Malaysia has an embassy in Tripoli. Relations are mainly in economic co-operation.
Malawi	4 November 1991	Main article: Malawi–Malaysia relations Malaysia together with Malawi are both significant tea producers, and co-operate in tri-national (with India) discussions of market conditions and promotion of the product globally.
Mauritius	13 August 1986	Main article: Malaysia–Mauritius relations Mauritius has a High Commission in Kuala Lumpur, while Malaysia embassy in Harare, Zimbabwe also accredited to Mauritius. Both are members of Commonwealth of Nations. Cooperation between the two countries include cultural exchanges, trade in goods, financial assistance and capacity building in various sectors.
Morocco	1963	Main article: Malaysia–Morocco relations Malaysia has an embassy in Rabat, and Morocco has an embassy in Kuala Lumpur.
Namibia	1990	Main article: Malaysia–Namibia relations Malaysia has a High Commission in Windhoek, and Namibia has a high commission in Kuala Lumpur. Both countries were once part of the British Empire and before Namibia achieved its independence, Malaysia has contributed to some operations in Namibia by sending a group of soldiers to help monitor the Namibia elections and peace process. Today, the relations are much more focused in economic co-operation.
Nigeria	5 March 1965	Main article: Malaysia–Nigeria relations The High Commissioner of Nigeria, Bello Shehu Ringim, speaking with the Yang Dipertua Dewan Negara, Abu Zahar Ujang, expresses the concern of Nigerian students being fooled by Malaysian private-owned universities and social problems. The Nigerian government are serious about the problems by its citizens and the negative perception of its students. Malaysia is committed to Nigeria's concern and will give solutions to the problem.
Senegal	1 April 1977	Both countries established diplomatic relations on 1 April 1977 Main article: Malaysia–Senegal relations Malaysia has an embassy in Dakar, and Senegal has an embassy in Kuala Lumpur.
Seychelles	1 May 1987	Both countries established diplomatic relations on 1 May 1987 Main article: Malaysia–Seychelles relations Seychelles has a High Commission in Subang Jaya.
Sierra Leone	28 January 1991	Both countries established diplomatic relations on 28 January 1991
South Africa	8 November 1993	Main article: Malaysia–South Africa relations Relations are good between Malaysia and South Africa, who view each other as close partners. Malaysia is the fourth largest new investor in South Africa, and the countries have exchanged High Commissioners.
Sudan	1973	Main article: Malaysia–Sudan relations The stability of Sudan has enabled the country to take experiences from Malaysia in law legislation and investor-friendly policies, as claimed by Mahathir Mohammad, former prime minister of Malaysia who visits Khartoum in November 2012. At least seven Memorandum of Understandings have been made, related to Malaysian companies. The expected growth of bilateral trade between Malaysia and Sudan will have a big impact on the import of Sudanese beef. In October 2021, Sudanese–Malaysia relations were adversely affected by the Sudanese transitional government's seizure of Malaysian state owned enterprise Petronas' assets and arrest of the company's country manager. In response, the Malaysian Government urged Sudan to honour the Bilateral Investment and Protection Treaty while Petronas submitted an arbitration request at the World Bank's International Centre for Settlement of Investment Disputes (ICSID).
Tanzania		Main article: Malaysia–Tanzania relations Malaysia has a High Commission in Dar es Salaam, and Tanzania has a High Commission in Kuala Lumpur.
The Gambia		Main article: Malaysia–The Gambia relations Malaysian embassy in Dakar is accredited to The Gambia, while the Gambian embassy in Abu Dhabi is accredited to Malaysia. The relations are friendly warm.
Tunisia	29 November 1964	Main article: Malaysia–Tunisia relations Several agreements were signed since 1969 covering a lot of sectors, including the agreement on suppression of visa and the agreement on economic and technical co-operation which signed in 1994. Several other drafts also are currently under negotiations.
Uganda	1962	Main article: Malaysia–Uganda relations Malaysia does not yet have a High Commission in Kampala, while Uganda has a consulate in Kuala Lumpur and Uganda's High Commission in India were also accredited to Malaysia.

== Malaysia and the Commonwealth of Nations ==
The Federation of Malaya became an independent native elective monarchy within the Commonwealth on 31 August 1957, with the Yang di-Pertuan Agong as head of state.

Malaya united with North Borneo (now Sabah), Sarawak, and Singapore to form Malaysia on 16 September 1963.

Singapore was expelled from Malaysia on 9 August 1965, and became an independent republic in the Commonwealth of Nations.

== See also ==
- List of diplomatic missions in Malaysia
- List of diplomatic missions of Malaysia
- Visa requirements for Malaysian citizens
- List of ambassadors and high commissioners to Malaysia
- List of ambassadors and high commissioners of Malaysia
