= Malaysia–European Union relations =

European Union–Malaysia relations
- European Union: Malaysia

European Union

Malaysia

Malaysia–European Union relations are the multilateral relations between Malaysia and the European Union. Negotiations for a Malaysia–European Union Free Trade Agreement are being carried out since 2010.

== History ==
Malaysia has an old relationship with certain countries in the European Union. During the colonial era, three European colonial powers: the Portuguese, the Dutch and the British arrived on Malaysian shores to establish colonies and maintain trade relations with the kingdoms which were there. In modern times, the relations started with the 1980 European Commission–ASEAN Agreement and has developed since the formation of European Economic Community (EEC) in 1957. The European Commission delegation office was established in Malaysia in 2003 and since then, policy interactions and co-operation between both federal and state authorities including the Malaysian and EU business communities have increased progressively.

In March 2019, tensions arose between the European Union and Malaysia following the conclusion by the European Commission that palm oil cultivation results in excessive deforestation and its use in transport fuel should be phased out by 2030. Malaysia, the world's second biggest palm oil producer after Indonesia, relies on the crop for billions of dollars in foreign exchange earnings and hundreds of thousands of jobs. Prime Minister Mahathir Mohamad said the European Union's increasingly hostile attitude towards palm oil was an attempt to protect alternatives that Europe produced itself, like rape seed oil. He alleged that the European Union is at risk of starting a trade war with Malaysia regarding its "grossly unfair" policies geared towards decreasing the use of palm oil, which Mahathir stated was "unfair" and an example of “rich people…try to impoverish poor people.”

== Trade relations ==
In 2011, Malaysia was the European Union's second largest trading partner in Southeast Asia after Singapore and the 23rd largest trading partner for the European Union in the world, while the European Union was Malaysia's 4th largest trading partner. Major exports from Malaysia including electrical and electronic products, palm oil, chemicals and chemical products, rubber products especially optical and scientific equipment, while European Union major exports to Malaysia are also electrical and electronic products with some other machinery, appliances and parts, chemicals and chemical products, transport equipment as well as iron and steel products. The total trade increasing from MYR63.66 billion in 2011 to MYR135 billion in 2013 with the European Union becoming Malaysia's third largest trading partner. The top three European Union countries who are major investors in Malaysia were the Netherlands with MYR2.4 billion, Germany with MYR 1.7 billion and United Kingdom with MYR500 million.

== Malaysia's foreign relations with EU member states ==
- Austria
- Belgium
- Bulgaria
- Croatia
- Cyprus
- Czech Republic
- Denmark
- Estonia
- Finland
- France
- Germany
- Greece
- Hungary
- (Republic of Ireland) Ireland
- Italy
- Latvia
- Lithuania
- Luxembourg
- Malta
- Netherlands
- Poland
- Portugal
- Romania
- Slovakia
- Slovenia
- Spain
- Sweden

== See also ==
- Foreign relations of the European Union
- Foreign relations of Malaysia
