= Malaysia–Syria relations =

- Malaysia: Syria

Malaysia–Syria relations are foreign relations between Malaysia and Syria. Syria has an embassy in Kuala Lumpur whilst Malaysia's embassy in Damascus was closed since August 2012, due to the Syrian Civil War. Malaysia has an honorary consulate in Damascus.

== History ==
The Federation of Malaya (Note: Before 1963, Malaysia was called the Federation of Malaya) and Syria established diplomatic relations in 1958. Syria established their embassy at Kuala Lumpur in 2001, while the Malaysian embassy in Damascus was established in 2002. President Bashar al-Assad visited Malaysia in 2003, with the Yang di-Pertuan Agong Tuanku Syed Sirajuddin visiting Syria in the same year.

In 2005, Syria's relations with the west weakened after it suffered a series of economic and political sanctions, such as the US recalling their ambassador from Damascus. This saw Syria respond with an increased focus on developing ties both with their existing allies Iran and Russia, and with eastern nations, especially China, India and Malaysia.

As a fellow nation where most of the population is Muslim, Malaysia has been a particular beneficiary of these efforts. Some Syrian elites have begun sending their children to learn English in Malaysia, rather than traditional destinations in the west. While relations between Syria and the West partially improved from about 2006, and especially after President Obama took office in 2009, Syria has continued to further develop ties with Malaysia. Efforts to increase trade between the two countries included a 2007 visit to Syria by Malaysian Prime Minister Abdullah Badawi, and the signing of several agreements in 2009 relating to air travel and the SME sector. The Syrian-Malaysian Business Council was established in February 2011 to help further develop trade between the two countries, just one month before the Syrian Civil War started.

== The Syrian Embassy in Kuala Lumpur ==
The Syrian Embassy in Kuala Lumpur, Malaysia is the official diplomatic mission to represent the Syrian Arab Republic in Malaysia, and it provides the consular services to all Syrian citizens who are in Thailand - Singapore - the Philippines - Taiwan and Brunei, and it is one of the 64 diplomatic missions of the Syrian Arab Republic around the world.

== Syrian refugees in Malaysia ==
In October 2015, Malaysian Prime Minister Najib Razak announced that at least 3,000 Syrian refugees would be resettled in the country, with Malaysia become one of the first Muslim-majority country to make this offer. Najib stated that Muslim countries were partly responsible for ensuring the well-being of the marginalised Syrians fleeing their country in massive numbers, causing social and economic stresses in Europe, during the migrant crisis. The first batch of refugees arrived at Kuala Lumpur International Airport on 11 December 2015 on a flight arriving from Istanbul, Turkey. The second batch of 68 Syrian refugees arrived at the Subang Air Force Base (outside of Kuala Lumpur) from Beirut, Lebanon in May 2016.

== See also ==
- Foreign relations of Syria
- Foreign relations of Malaysia
