= Malaysia–Saudi Arabia relations =

- Malaysia: Saudi Arabia

Malaysia–Saudi Arabia relations refers to the current and historical relationship between Malaysia and Saudi Arabia. Saudi Arabia has an embassy in Kuala Lumpur, while Malaysia has a High Commission in Riyadh and a consulate general in Jeddah. Relations, both diplomatic and economic, are quite close between the two Muslim-majority Organisation of Islamic Cooperation (OIC) members.

== History ==
The relations between both countries since the establishment of diplomatic relations in the early 1960 is based on mutual respect and work to develop relations in all fields. Saudi Arabia opened its embassy in Kuala Lumpur on 1961 along with the opening of Malaysian embassy in Riyadh. Since then, the relations are good. Saudi Arabian King Faisal made his first royal visit to Malaysia in the summer of 1970. This was followed by the visit of King Abdullah at the end of January 2006 aimed to discover the new area for co-operation. In early 2017, King Salman visited Malaysia to increase the economic ties between both countries. Following his visit, the King also received his honorary Doctor of Letters from University Malaya and an honorary doctorate of Philosophy in Political Science from the International Islamic University of Malaysia.

In March 2021, Saudi Arabia and Malaysia signed three agreements, the first included the minutes of the establishment of the Saudi-Malaysian Coordination Council, the second dealt with the arrival of pilgrims, and the third was a memorandum of understanding in the field of Islamic affairs.

== Economic relations ==
Saudi Arabia is the second largest Middle East trading partner for Malaysia with 60% of Malaysia's total exports to Saudi Arabia comprising palm oil and other palm-based agricultural products, machinery, equipment and parts, processed food and electrical and electronic products. Until 2016, more than 100,000 Saudis have visited Malaysia with bilateral trade reach more than RM13.2 billion. In 2017, Saudi Aramco has signed a $7 billion deal for a 50% stake in a mega Malaysian oil refinery project in Johor with Petronas. Another seven memorandum of understanding (MOUs) in construction, halal co-operation, aerospace and hajj services was signed in the same year with an estimated total value of about RM9.74 billion.

== Security relations ==
In 2015, Saudi Arabia put Malaysia as part of the Islamic Military Alliance (IMA) to curb the rampant Islamic terrorism.

In 2018 Malaysia announced it will withdraw its troops stationed in Saudi Arabia to reflect the country's neutrality in the region.

== Resident diplomatic missions ==
- Malaysia has an embassy in Riyadh and a consulate-general in Jeddah.
- Saudi Arabia has an embassy in Kuala Lumpur.

== See also ==
- Foreign relations of Malaysia
- Foreign relations of Saudi Arabia
