= Malaysia–South Africa relations =

- Malaysia: South Africa

Malaysia–South Africa relations refers to the current and historical relationship between Malaysia and South Africa. Malaysia has a high commission in Pretoria, and South Africa has a high commission in Kuala Lumpur. Relations between the two countries have been very good and have continued to improve, with each other view themselves as close partners in the developing world. Both are full members of the Commonwealth of Nations.

== History ==
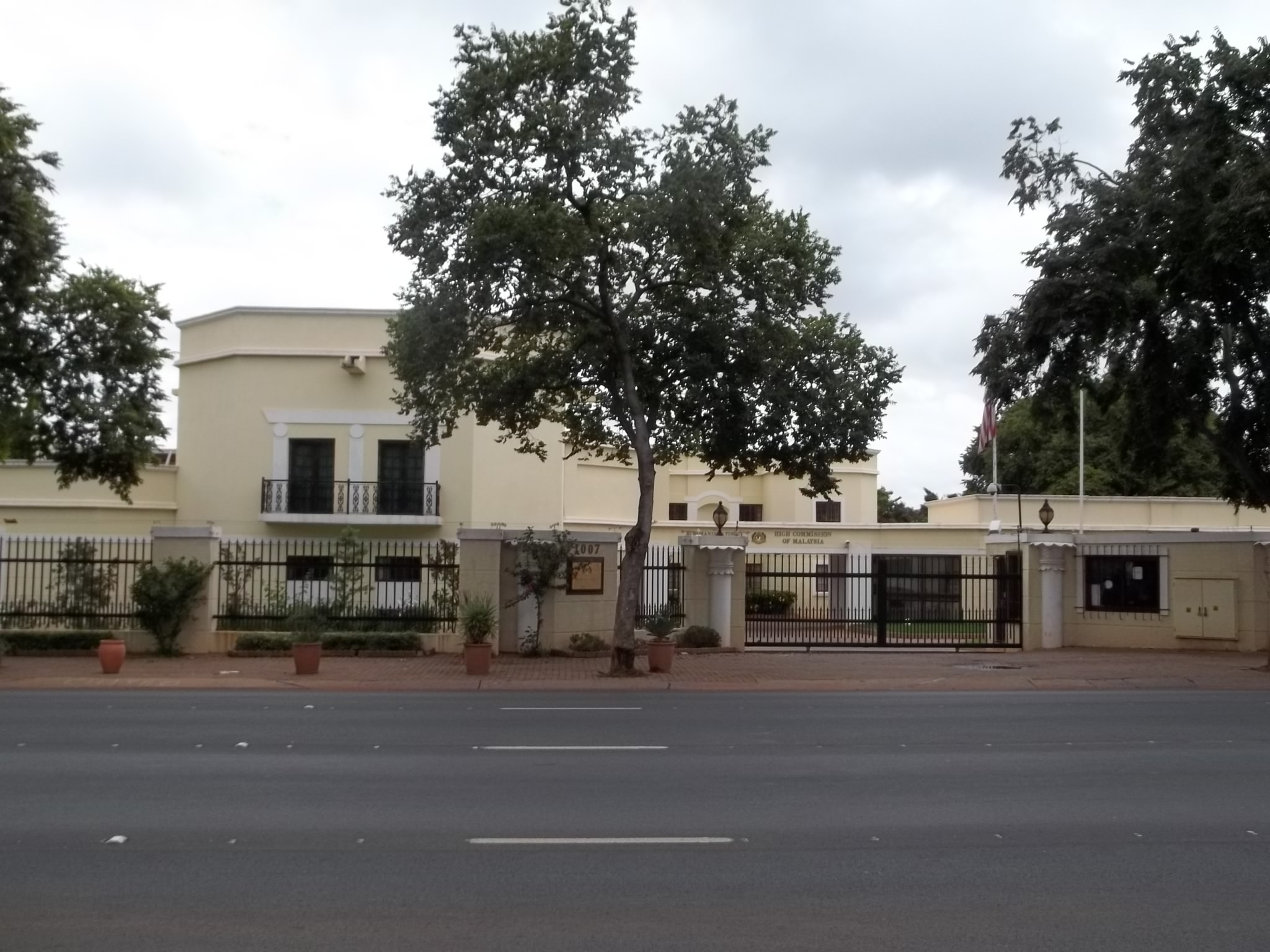
Malaysia High Commission in South Africa

Following its independence, Malaysia (then the Federation of Malaya) supported moves to isolate the white minority government in South Africa and its policy of apartheid, leading to South Africa's withdrawal from the Commonwealth in 1961. It also imposed a travel ban on travel to and from South Africa, which was lifted in 1991, with a Liaison Office being established in Johannesburg the following year. Weekly direct flights between Kuala Lumpur and Johannesburg began on 26 October 1992. The two countries established diplomatic relations on 8 November 1993. In March 1997, South Africa's President Nelson Mandela made a state visit to Malaysia to strengthen economic ties between the two with the signing of several economic agreements.

Malaysia was one of the strongest supporters of the ANC during its fight against apartheid. Prime Minister Mahathir Mohamad was the first foreign leader to visit Mandela after his release in 1990.

== Economic relations ==
In 2003, South Africa request for more investments and assistance to build their economy and human resources. By the time, Malaysia is already the third largest investor in the country with its investments mainly in the telecommunications, oil and gas and hospitality sectors. By 2010, Malaysia was the fourth largest new investor in South Africa. In the same year, Malaysia was South Africa's 20th largest total trade partner with roughly 4.8 billion Rand in volume.

== Resident diplomatic missions ==
- Malaysia has a high commission in Pretoria.
- South Africa has a high commission in Kuala Lumpur.

== See also ==
- Foreign relations of Malaysia
- Foreign relations of South Africa
- Africans in Malaysia
