= Belarus–Malaysia relations =

- Belarus: Malaysia

Belarus and Malaysia established diplomatic relations in 1992. Neither country has a resident ambassador. Belarus embassy in Jakarta is accredited to Malaysia. Both countries are members of the Non-Aligned Movement.

== History ==
Relations between the two countries have been established since 5 March 1992 with the focus mainly on economic co-operation. In February 2003, the Belarusian Minister of Foreign Affairs Mikhail Khvostov took part in the 13th Summit of the Non-Aligned Movement (NAM) in Kuala Lumpur, Malaysia.

== Economic relations ==
Major exports from Belarus are potash and nitrogen fertilisers, while the main imports from Malaysia are rubber, lamps and tubes, cocoa, TV sets, video monitors, video projectors and radios. Currently, Belarus is keen to expand trade and investment ties, and increase export of potash fertilisers and tires to Malaysia. In 2013, a Belarus National Exposition has been launched in Malaysia to features high-tech and innovative products from Belarus. The Belarusian region of Minsk Oblast has announced its intention to develop co-operation with the Malaysian state of Sabah, with the Belarusian side said that the relations in all spheres between the two countries should develop more actively, including between regions.

== Security relations ==
Malaysia is also seeking military co-operation with Belarus to repair its military aircraft.

== Resident diplomatic missions ==
- Belarus is accredited to Malaysia from its embassy in Jakarta, Indonesia.
- Malaysia is accredited to Belarus from its embassy in Moscow, Russia.

== See also ==
- Foreign relations of Belarus
- Foreign relations of Malaysia
