= Malaysia–Switzerland relations =

- Malaysia: Switzerland

Diplomatic mission
- Malaysian Embassy, Bern: Swiss Embassy, Kuala Lumpur

Envoy

Malaysia–Switzerland relations refers to bilateral foreign relations between the two countries, Malaysia and Switzerland. Switzerland maintains an embassy in Kuala Lumpur, while Malaysia has established diplomatic representations in Bern, with additional consulates in Geneva, Basel, and Zurich. A distinctive aspect of the bilateral relationship is the visa exemption granted to Malaysian nationals for entry into Switzerland, a benefit that, within Southeast Asia, is extended only to Singapore as well.

== History ==
Swiss trading entities began their operations in Malaysia as early as the 19th century. Following Malaysia's independence in 1957, Switzerland formally recognized and initiated diplomatic ties with the country in 1963. Since then, the two nations have consistently enjoyed strong bilateral relations. On 13 October 1993, as a result of the global economic crisis, the Malaysian Embassy in Berne, Switzerland was closed, reopening on 13 April 2003. In 2025 Malaysia signed the EFTA-Malaysia Partnership Agreement which further boosted the economic ties that Malaysia had with Switzerland.

== Economic relations ==
Economic cooperation between Switzerland and Malaysia is highlighted by Malaysia's role as a gateway to the Asia-Pacific market, which hosts over 630 million consumers. This positions Malaysia as Switzerland's fourth largest trading partner within the Association of Southeast Asian Nations (ASEAN) bloc. The trade primarily involves Swiss exports of machinery, pharmaceuticals, and chemical products to Malaysia, and imports of electronic devices and machinery from Malaysia. The relationship is characterized by the operation of approximately 135 Swiss-affiliated companies in Malaysia, employing over 20,000 individuals.

By the close of 2017, over 800 Swiss citizens were residing in Malaysia.

== Resident diplomatic missions ==
- Malaysia has an embassy in Bern.
- Switzerland has an embassy in Kuala Lumpur.

== See also ==
- Foreign relations of Malaysia
- Foreign relations of Switzerland
