= Azerbaijan–Malaysia relations =

- Azerbaijan: Malaysia

Diplomatic mission
- Embassy of Azerbaijan, Kuala Lumpur: Embassy of Malaysia, Baku

Azerbaijan–Malaysia relations are the bilateral relations between Azerbaijan and Malaysia. Azerbaijan has an embassy in Kuala Lumpur, while Malaysia has an embassy in Baku. Both countries are members of the Group of 77 and Non-Aligned Movement.

== History ==
Malaysia recognized the independence of the Republic of Azerbaijan on 31 December 1991, shortly after Azerbaijan declared its independence from the Soviet Union. The formal establishment of full diplomatic relations between the two countries occurred on 5 April 1993.

Since establishing diplomatic relations, Malaysia and Azerbaijan have engaged in various activities to strengthen their ties. Both countries have exchanged high-level visits and collaborated on international and regional issues. Azerbaijan opened its embassy in Kuala Lumpur in June 2007, while Malaysia established its embassy in Baku on 1 April 2014.

== Cultural relations ==
Both countries have organized cultural events and student exchange programs to promote mutual understanding. Cooperation in higher education, such as joint training and research, has been encouraged, with the Azerbaijani ambassador in 2023 acknowledging good political ties while emphasizing strengthening of economic relations.

== Economic relations ==
In 2012, bilateral trade amounted to approximately US$400 million, about 93% of which is exports from Azerbaijan to Malaysia. Malaysian exports to Azerbaijan include petrochemical products, fuel, and palm oil, while Azerbaijan overwhelmingly exports crude oil. In the same year, approximately 290 Malaysians went on business travel to Azerbaijan. Malaysia-based cargo airline MASkargo's main transit hup is Heydar Aliyev International Airport in Baku.

=== Imports and exports ===
Imports of Azerbaijan
| Year | Amount Thousands of USD |
|---|---|
| 2020 | 68 843,26 |
| 2021 | 76 539,56 ▲ |
| 2022 | 54 537,88 ▼ |

Exports of Azerbaijan
| Year | Amount Thousands of USD |
|---|---|
| 2020 | 60 658,28 |
| 2021 | 512,74 ▼ |
| 2022 | 38 889,16 ▲ |

== See also ==
- Foreign relations of Azerbaijan
- Foreign relations of Malaysia
