= Malaysia–Tunisia relations =

- Malaysia: Tunisia

Malaysia–Tunisia relations refers to bilateral foreign relations between Malaysia and Tunisia. Diplomatic relations established in 1962. The Malaysian Embassy in Algiers covers Tunisia while the Tunisian Embassy in Jakarta covers Malaysia. The relations are mainly in economic relations with several agreements has been signed. On 24 November 1992, Malaysian Prime Minister Mahathir Mohamad arrived Tunisia to begin a three-day official visit. Both countries are members of the Organisation of Islamic Cooperation, Group of 77 and Non-Aligned Movement.

== Economic relations ==
In 1993, trade relations between the two countries stood at MYR16.47 million with Malaysian export reach MYR12.49 million while Tunisian export reach around MYR3.98 million. In 2013, Tunisia invited any investments from Malaysian companies especially in the development of their city in Sfax. Besides that, Tunisia is also keen to invest in Malaysia especially in Islamic banking and halal products.

== Education relations ==
In education, Tunisia has offered places for Malaysian students in Ez-Zitouna University while Malaysia provided places for Tunisian students in the International Islamic University Malaysia.

== See also ==
- Foreign relations of Malaysia
- Foreign relations of Tunisia
