= France–Malaysia relations =

- France: Malaysia

France–Malaysia relations are the foreign relations between France and Malaysia. France has an embassy in Kuala Lumpur, and Malaysia has an embassy in Paris.

== History ==
The relations started after the Federation of Malaya achieved independence in 1957, although the first Malayan ambassador to France only arrived in Paris in 1959. During the administration of Jacques Chirac and Mahathir Mohamad, the relations significantly improved, especially in economics, politics and cultural aspects.

== Economic relations ==
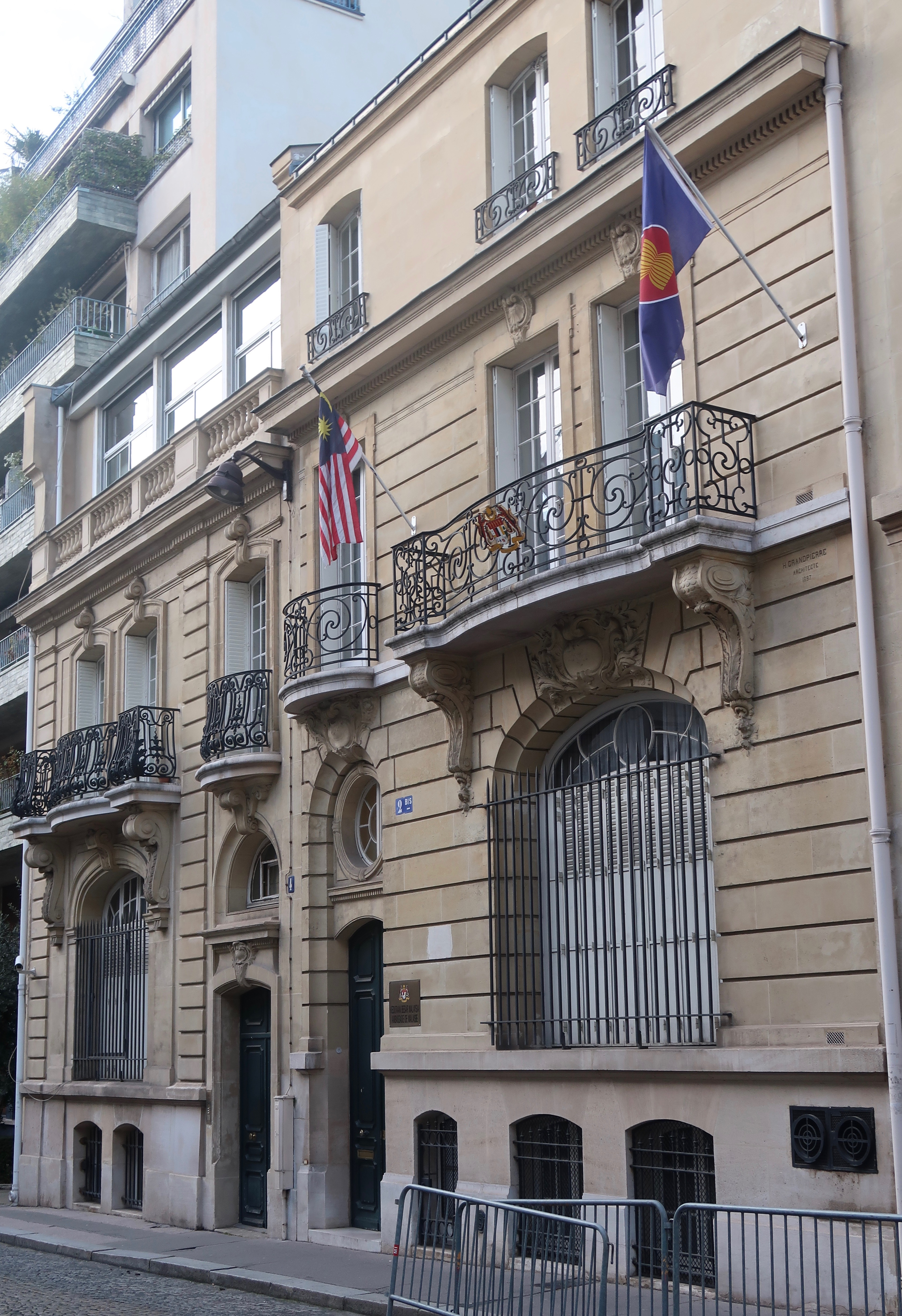
Embassy of Malaysia in Paris

Many French companies have started investment in Malaysia, primarily in technology sectors. Malaysia is currently considered by France as the second largest economic partner in ASEAN and there are 260 French companies operating, which are ready to support all projects to turn Malaysia into a fully "developed country" by 2020. In 2017, the French embassy seeking to enhance co-operation in education and culture as well sought to establish co-operation with the Malaysian state of Sabah to develop the presence of French companies and having French language taught in more schools in the state. The following year, France also continues to eye investment in the neighbouring Sarawak as several French industries have already establish present in some fields in the state such as in oil and gas, engineering and electricity companies. There is also a Malaysian French Chamber of Commerce and Industry (CCIFM).

== Education and culture ==
Since 1960s, the French government has provided grants and scholarships to Malaysian students to study in France especially on science and technical fields. While in Malaysia, around 100 French students go to Malaysia every year to study.

The Malaysia-France University Centre (MFUC) is a bilateral institution, set on a government to government initiative in 2006. Its primary objective is to reinforce cooperation between France and Malaysia in the Higher Education and Research sectors. In accordance with the Higher Education strategies of the two countries, the MFUC functions as an interface between the two education systems and facilitates the creation of partnerships (joint research, degree transfer, student exchanges or other) from pre-U to Doctorate level.

MFUC is located in Jalan Bukit Bintang, open during weekdays from 9 am-6 pm.

Alliance Française operates three branches within Malaysia - two in Kuala Lumpur and one in Penang's capital city, George Town. The centres offer French language courses and translation services, as well as hosting French cultural activities, such as the annual French Art and Film Festival which is held in major cities nationwide.

In 2018, George Town was twinned with the French city of Arles, which, like the former, is also home to a UNESCO World Heritage Site. The partnership between both cities includes programmes and activities aimed at promoting the cities' arts and culture.

== Security relations ==
France is one of Malaysia's main military partners in the supply of military equipment and defence services. Since the 1990s, both countries have striven to consolidate defence relations, and many French military industries have begun to establish co-operation with their Malaysian partners. One example is the French naval shipbuilding company, the DCNS. In 2002, two Malaysian submarines were built in France and Spanish shipyards which were then delivered to the Royal Malaysian Navy in 2009 and early 2010 respectively. Other French companies have also been actively taking part on the Langkawi International Maritime and Air Show (LIMA) and in DSA exhibitions. Initially, the French-Malaysian defence relationship was based on large military programmes of arms procurement.

== Resident diplomatic missions ==
- France has an embassy in Kuala Lumpur.
- Malaysia has an embassy in Paris.

== See also ==
- Foreign relations of France
- Foreign relations of Malaysia
