= Malaysia–Uzbekistan relations =

- Malaysia: Uzbekistan

Malaysia–Uzbekistan relations refers to the bilateral relations between Malaysia and Uzbekistan. Malaysia has an embassy in Tashkent, and Uzbekistan has an embassy in Ampang, Selangor. Both countries maintain good relations. Both countries are members of the Non-Aligned Movement and Organisation of Islamic Cooperation.

== History ==
Bilateral diplomatic relations were established in 1992 with Malaysia opened its embassy in Tashkent in 1993. Since 1992, the President of Uzbekistan Islam Karimov has made several visits to Southeast Asian countries such as Malaysia and Indonesia which were part of his longest trip abroad.

== Economic relations ==
Both countries are developing ties in the areas of economic and investment co-operation, oil and gas, education and tourism. Many Malaysian investors also has started doing business in Uzbekistan. In 2012, following the 20 years friendship relations between both countries, the Malaysian and Uzbekistan Friendship Association (MAUFA) was established. The association also establish a joint projects in the field of educational tourism, photo-tourism, students exchange, mass-media and ICT. In 2011, many of the joint projects operates in Uzbekistan, particularly in the oil and gas industry, manufacture of textiles, furniture and electrical products. Uzbekistan is also keen to learn from Malaysia on the tourism industry.

== Transport links ==
Batik Air Malaysia and Uzbekistan Airways operate flights between the two countries.
