= Malaysia–Poland relations =

- Malaysia: Poland

Malaysia–Poland relations refers to bilateral foreign relations between Malaysia and Poland. Malaysia has an embassy in Warsaw, and Poland has an embassy in Kuala Lumpur and consulates in Kuching and George Town.

== History ==
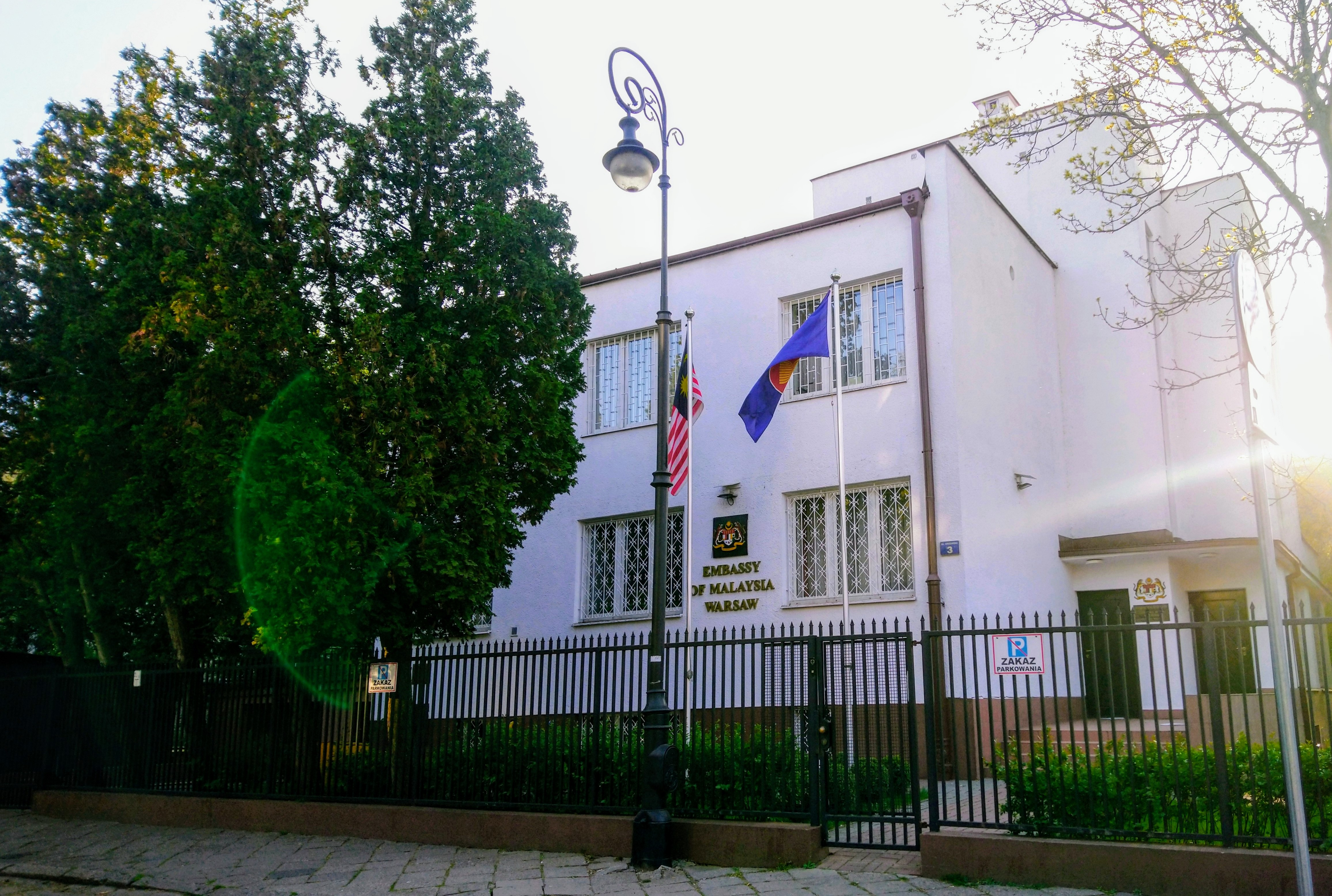
Embassy of Malaysia in Warsaw

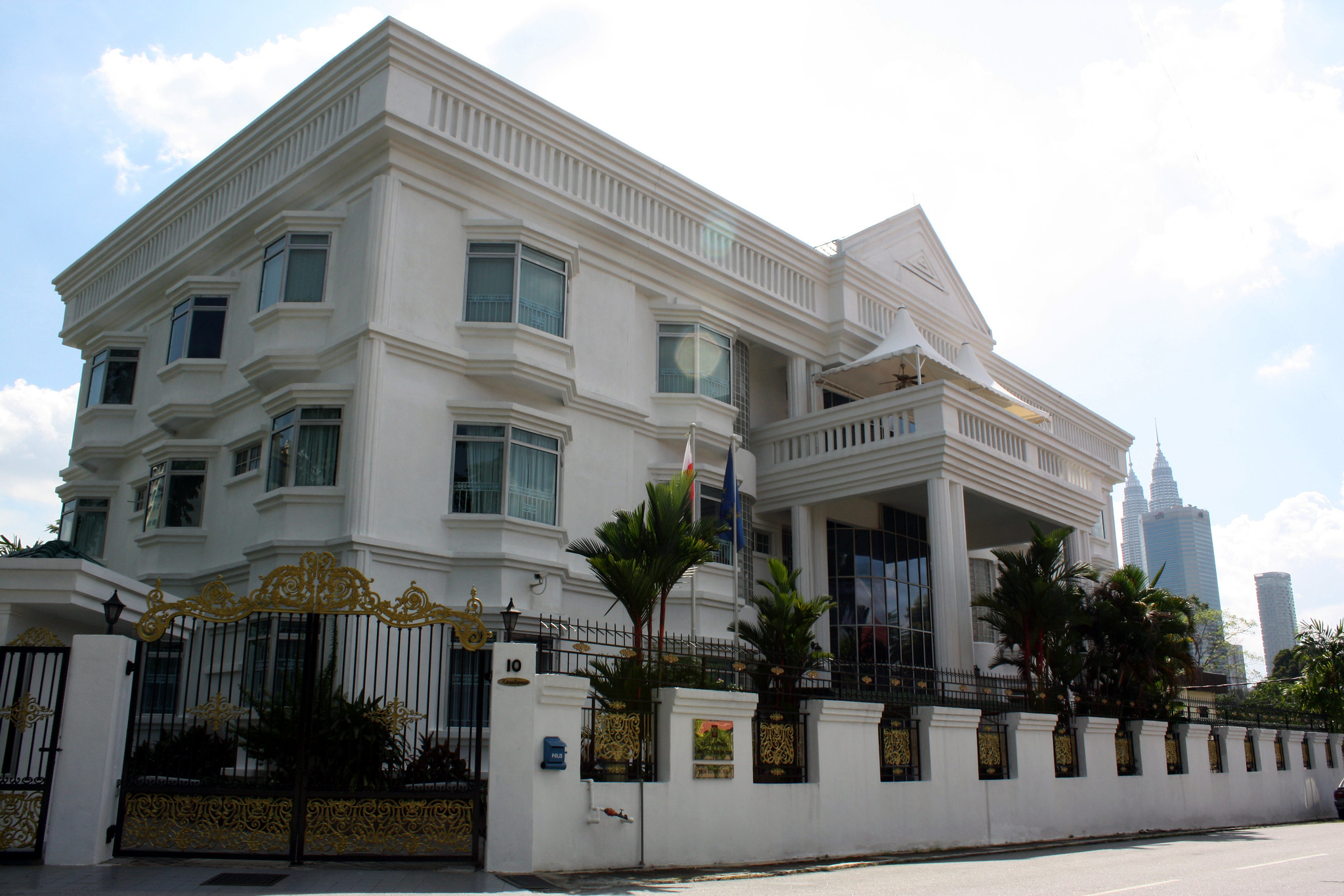
Embassy of Poland in Kuala Lumpur

Following the establishment of relations with Soviet Union, Malaysia also expanded its relations to central European countries such as Poland. A double tax avoidance agreement was signed between the two countries in Warsaw in 1977. Until now, relations between the two countries are mostly based on economic and trade with Malaysia became one of the most important economic and trading partner for Poland in Southeast Asia.

== Economic relations ==
In economic, a Malaysia-Poland Business Council has been established to further strength economic co-operation between the two countries. Poland were keen to explore opportunities in the Malaysia's Islamic Finance market with the starting of halal-based product in Malaysia and the country were one of the few countries from the European Union which been given halal certifications from the Malaysian authorities for its food products. While Malaysian contractors were interested in bidding for major projects in Poland, especially which related to infrastructure and development. Poland greentech companies also were looking for partners to set up base in Malaysia. The two countries established economic and commercial relations in 1970 following the signing of a trade agreement. In early 2013, Raja Muda of Perlis, Tuanku Syed Faizuddin Putra Jamalullail has urged Polish companies to look for opportunities to grow their business in Malaysia. Thus in July 2013, a new income tax treaty were signed to replace the 1977 Treaty which are focused to strengthen bilateral co-operation as well as trade and investments between the two countries. From January to April 2013, the total trade between Malaysia and Poland reached around $220 million and Poland become Malaysia's 12th largest trading partner among European countries. Malaysia's main exports to Poland included machinery, electrical machinery, rubber, palm oil, iron and steel products while Poland's major exports to Malaysia were vehicles, tools and also machinery and electrical machinery products.

The Polish Statistical Office, in 2018, stated that the turnover of Polish trade with Malaysia amounted to US$1.175 billion. Exports were over US$185 million and imports were over US$990 million.

== Security relations ==
In 2002, Poland reached an agreement with Malaysia to supply its PT-91 tanks to the Malaysian Army with an estimate value of contract comprising $250 million over the next 10 years. The agreement was finally sealed the following year. and also in the cybersecurity field, the Polish president Andrzej Duda and the Prime Minister Datuk Seri Anwar agreed to enhance bilateral cooperation in digital transformation and high technology during his visit to Malaysia from 9 to 11 June 2025.

== Resident diplomatic missions ==
- Malaysia has an embassy in Warsaw.
- Poland has an embassy in Kuala Lumpur.

== See also ==
- Foreign relations of Malaysia
- Foreign relations of Poland
