= Malawi–Malaysia relations =

- Malawi: Malaysia

Malawi–Malaysia relations refer to the bilateral relations between Malawi and Malaysia. Both are the members of Non-Aligned Movement, and the Commonwealth of Nations. Malawi has a non resident ambassador in Beijing. Malaysia has a non resident ambassaror in Harare.

== Economic relations ==
The two countries are both significant tea producers, and co-operate in tri-national (with India) discussions of market conditions and promotion of the product globally. In 1996, trade between the countries was valued at US$1.02 million. Malaysian exports primarily consist of printed material, alcohol, chemicals, electrical machinery, and clothing. Malawian exports are primarily agricultural produce, including fruit, vegetables, seeds and oils. and telecommunications company Telekom Malaysia. However, Telekom Malaysia sold its stake in its Malawian joint venture in 2006.

== Diplomatic relations ==
The two nations established diplomatic relations on 6 November 1991. In the period 1990–1997, 42 Malawians visited Malaysia under the Malaysian Government's South-South programs to share knowledge and technology with other countries. As of 1996, Malaysia does not plan to set up a diplomatic mission in Malawi, considering it too costly. Instead Malaysian diplomatic issues are conducted via representatives in Zimbabwe. Malawian President Bakili Muluzi visited Malaysia in 1996, and Malaysian Prime Minister Mahathir Mohamad visited Malawi for 3 days in return as the first country on a tour of three African countries in 1997. Malawian governmental delegations led by Justin Malewezi to Malaysia in 2003 marvelled at the industrial transformation of Malaysia between the 1980s and 1990s, and sought to learn lessons from the policies which enabled it.
