= Malaysia–Mauritius relations =

- Malaysia: Mauritius

Malaysia–Mauritius relations are the bilateral foreign relations between Mauritius and Malaysia. Mauritius has a high commission in Kuala Lumpur, while the Malaysian embassy in Zimbabwe is also accredited to Mauritius. Both countries are members of the Commonwealth of Nations.

== History ==
Both countries were once part of the British Empire and diplomatic relations were established in January 1987. Relations between the two countries had been boosted since the visit of the former Malaysian Prime Minister Mahathir Mohamad.

== Economic relations ==
Cooperation between the two countries includes cultural exchanges, trade in goods, financial assistances and capacity building in various sectors. Malaysia has assisted Mauritius on its country development such as the providing of places in training centres and institutions of higher learning for students from the country under the Malaysian Technical Cooperation Programme (MTCP). There are currently six Malaysian companies investing in Mauritius, some of it are in the banking sector with a joint venture with the Mauritius local banks. Other Malaysian investors has keen to invest in Mauritius with some projects concentrated on the construction of textile factory, hotel, and palm oil refinery. Some agreements such as the establishment of a joint commission on economic and technical research and forging of the cultural links were also signed. Beside that, Mauritius has ready to co-operate in the trade of sugar with Malaysia.
