= Malaysia–Palestine relations =

Bilateral relations between Malaysia and the State of Palestine

- Malaysia: Palestine

Diplomatic mission
- Embassy of Malaysia, Cairo: Palestinian Embassy, Kuala Lumpur

Envoy
- Ambassador Zamani Ismail: Ambassador Walid Abu Ali

Malaysia–Palestine relations (Malay: Hubungan Malaysia–Palestin; Jawi: هوبوڠن مليسيا–ڤلسطين; Arabic: العلاقات الماليزية الفلسطينية, romanized: alealaqat almaliziat alfilastinia) refers to bilateral foreign relations between the two countries, Malaysia and Palestine.

== Diplomatic relations ==
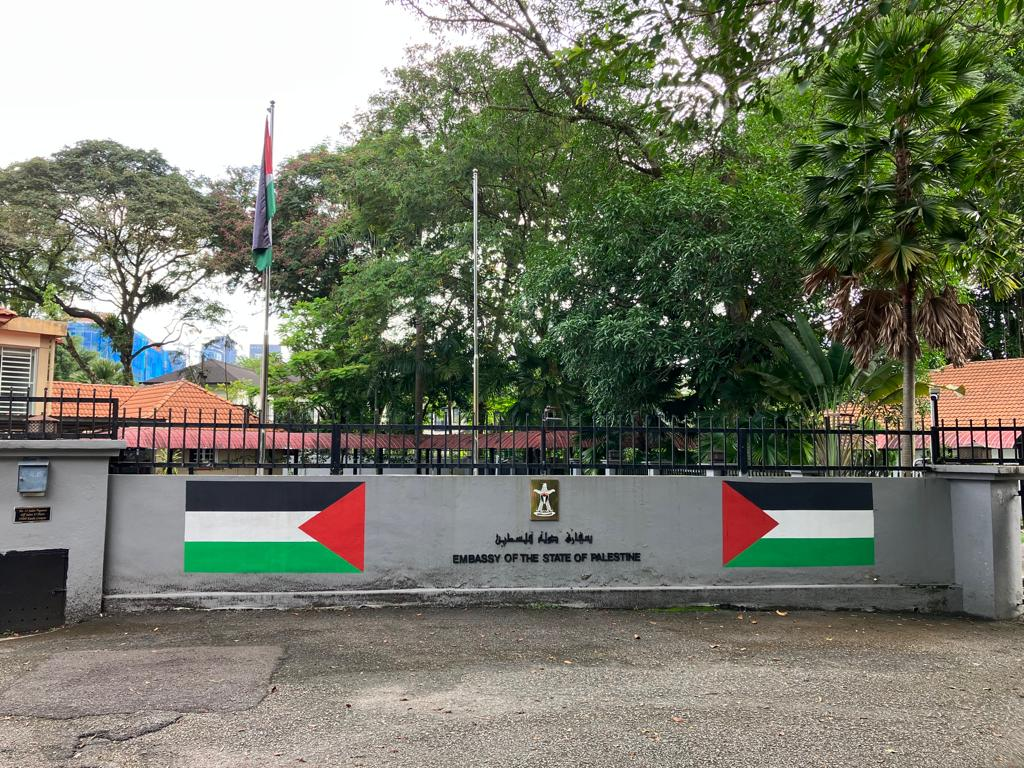
Embassy of Palestine in Kuala Lumpur

With no recognition to the Israeli occupation of Palestine, Malaysia has stood up for the rights and freedoms of Palestinians and has supported their struggles. Malaysia also refuses to recognise the State of Israel until a peace agreement is reached to realise the two-state solution.

Palestine is represented in Malaysia by an embassy in the capital Kuala Lumpur. The Palestinian Cultural Organisation Malaysia is thought to act as an unofficial embassy of Hamas, and Hamas leaders have visited Malaysia. In 2013, Malaysian prime minister Najib Razak visited the Gaza Strip.

In 2023, following the October 7 attacks on Israel, Malaysian prime minister Anwar Ibrahim contacted Hamas leaders to express his unwavering support. Anwar said that Malaysia would not bow to diplomatic pressure from the United States for Malaysia to designate Hamas as a terrorist organisation. In response to the Gaza war that followed the October 7 attacks, the Malaysian government allocated RM100 million in aid to the Palestinians. In late August 2025, Anwar allocated another RM100 million to the Sumud Nusantara aid flotilla.

== Palestinians in Malaysia ==
Malaysia awards scholarships to Palestinian students. In 1993, there were approximately 3,000–5,000 Palestinian students in Malaysia, with many Palestinians also choosing Malaysia as a country for temporary refuge.

On 21 April 2018, the Palestinian engineer, lecturer, and Hamas member Fadi Mohammad al-Batsh was gunned down by two men on a motorbike while heading to a mosque for dawn prayers. According to Israeli media, al-Batsch was an expert on rocket and drone accuracy, who had recently published material on drone development and transmitters for controlling drones. In response, Hamas issued a statement identifying al-Batsh as one of their own and blamed his death on the "hand of treachery." His relatives have blamed Israel for assassinating al-Batsch. Malaysia's Deputy Prime Minister Dato' Seri Dr. Ahmad Zahid Hamidi has announced that the Malaysian Government would investigate the possibility that foreign agents were involved in his killing. Zahid described the assailants as two European or Middle Eastern men who were riding a powerful BMW 1100cc motorbike. Israel has so far denied involvement in al-Batsh's assassination.

In late September 2022, the Royal Malaysian Police foiled an alleged Mossad plot to kidnap two Palestinian computer experts in Kuala Lumpur using an undercover cell consisting of Malaysian nationals who had allegedly been recruited and trained in Europe. According to Malaysian authorities, this cell was also allegedly involved in spying on important sites including airports, government electronic companies, and tracking down Palestinian activists. Though these operatives kidnapped one of the men, the second escaped and alerted Malaysian police. The operatives allegedly assisted Mossad officials via video call in interrogating their captive, who was questioned about the computer programming and software capabilities of Hamas and its Izz ad-Din al-Qassam Brigades. With the aid of the second Palestinian man, Malaysian police were able to track down the car registration plates to a house where the alleged kidnappers were arrested and the man was freed.

== Informal relations ==
In 1930s, Burhanuddin al-Helmy from the Malay Peninsula was amongst the first activist to pay a visit to Palestine and joined a demonstration against the 1917 Balfour Declaration on establishment of "national home for the Jewish people" in Palestine. Upon returning to the Malay Peninsula in 1936, he was arrested by the British colonial masters. However, Burhanuddin was steadfast in publishing a magazine named "Taman Bahagia" (Happy Garden), featured himself as a fighter of the Palestinian people. The British later banned the magazine for fear of inciting the anger of the Malays against British colonialism.

In 2020, "Jalan Raja Laut 1", a road in Malaysia’s national capital Kuala Lumpur, has been renamed as "Jalan Palestin" (Palestine Street) as a symbolic of opposition and fighting for the freedom of Palestine from Israel. On 31 August 2021, a western district in Gaza named one of its streets "Malaysia Street" in honour of Malaysia's support for Palestine. Furthermore, locals in Gaza also raised Malaysian flags to celebrate Merdeka Day.

=== Civil society groups ===
Several Palestinian-oriented non-governmental organisations (NGOs) operate in Malaysia. Notable advocacy groups include the Palestinian Cultural Organization Malaysia (PCOM), Quds Foundation Malaysia (QFM), and the Malaysian chapter of the Boycott, Divestment and Sanctions (BDS) movement. Notable humanitarian relief NGOs include Aman Palestin, Aqsa Syarif (MyCare), Viva Palestina Malaysia (VPM), Cakna Palestine, Cinta Gaza Malaysia (CGM), and My Aqsa. Notable advocacy networks include MgGMJ, the Save Al-Quds Campaign, and MyAqsa Defenders.

One notable group is Aman Palestin Berhad which was established by several Islamist activists including Malaysian Muslim Solidarity (ISMA) head Abdullah Zaik. The organisation has sought to help the Palestinian people by promoting awareness of the Palestinian issue, providing aid and supporting Palestinian building projects, and advocating for Palestinian rights at various levels. Aman Palestin has funded the construction and maintenance of orphanages, provided education assistance to Palestinian students, supported poverty alleviation, charitable agricultural and social projects, and medical aid in Palestine, and financially supported Palestinian students at Malaysian universities. Aman Palestin has also organised fundraising campaigns during the 2008-09 Gaza War. In November 2023, the Malaysian Anti-Corruption Commission raided on Aman Palestin's offices to investigate the embezzlement of funds. They seized assets totalling RM15,868,762.00 in 41 direct and indirect bank accounts and including four 1-kilogramme Grade 999.9 gold bars. On 15 February 2024, the Kuala Lumpur High Court charged Aman Palestin's executive chairman, CEO, and director with 164 charges of embezzlement over the alleged misappropriation of donations worth RM85 million (US$17 million).
