= Malaysia My Second Home =

Programme to allow foreigners stay in Malaysia for a certain period of time

The Malaysia My Second Home (MM2H) is a programme promoted by the Malaysia Tourism Authority and the Immigration Department of Malaysia, to allow foreigners to stay in Malaysia for a period of ten years. Foreigners who fulfill certain criteria may apply, and a successful applicant is allowed to bring a spouse, an unmarried child under the age of 21, and parents who are over 60 years old.

Since the programme started in 2002, a total 40,000 applications have been approved. The country's economy is stimulated with a cumulative gross value added income of RM11.89 billion from 2002 to 2019 through visa fees, property purchases, personal vehicle purchases, fixed deposits, and monthly household expenditure.

== Malaysian Government support ==
Currently the Ministry of Tourism and Culture (MOTAC) is responsible for promoting MM2H, with approval of applicants and issuance of visas made directly by the Immigration Department of the Ministry of Home Affairs. A "MM2H One-Stop Centre" has been set up under the MOT and it is anticipated that all visa procedures will be transferred from the Immigration Department to the One-Stop Centre by the end of 2006. The Malaysian State of Sarawak has its own MM2H program under its Sarawak Tourism Board, that has slightly different requirements and incentives.

== Eligibility ==
The program is open to all citizens of countries recognised by Malaysia. Applicants are allowed to bring along their spouse and unmarried children below 21 years old. So far over 42,000 people have been approved for the MM2H visa.

== Approval criteria ==
=== Financial requirement ===
Applicants below 50 years of age are required to show proof of liquid assets worth a minimum of RM500,000 and offshore income of RM40,000 per month. Applicants below 50 years old are required to open a fixed deposit account in Malaysia of MYR300,000.00 at any bank with a local branch. This includes local branches of international banks such as HSBC, Standard Chartered, etc.

The State of Sarawak does not allow applicants below 50 years of age, with the exception of individuals over 30 years of age who have children enrolled in schools or undergoing long term medical treatment in Sarawak.

After a period of one year, the participant can withdraw up to MYR150,000.00 for approved expenses relating to house purchase, education for children in Malaysia and medical purposes. However, a minimum balance of MYR150,000.00 must be maintained from the second year onwards and throughout the stay in Malaysia under this program.

Note: Fixed deposits (similar to time deposits), in Malaysia are a conservative form of investment with interest rates ranging from 3% to 4% per annum (p.a.). MM2 program announced that effective from first of year 2017 requirement for cancellation of surety bond withdrawn and amount be refunded through e transfer 'Except for the State of Sarawak Applicants aged 50 and above' are required to show proof of liquid assets of RM350,000 and off shore income of RM10,000 per month. For those who have retired, they are required to show proof of receiving pension from government of at least RM10,000 per month.

Applicants 50 years of age or older can do one of the following:

- Open a fixed deposit account in Malaysia of MYR350,000.00 with a local branch; OR
- Show proof of monthly off-shore government pension of at least MYR10,000.00.

Note : In addition to the above, all applicants are required to show that they have sufficient funds to maintain themselves for the duration of the 10-year visa. In practice this means showing at least MYR150,000 in the bank, and a monthly income of MYR10,000.

After a period of one year, the participant who fulfills the fixed deposit criteria can withdraw up to MYR50,000.00 for approved expenses relating to house purchase, education for children in Malaysia and medical purposes. However, a minimum balance of MYR100,000.00 must be maintained from the second year onwards and throughout stay in Malaysia under this program.

For Sarawak Applicants must be over 50 years of age, but the financial conditions are less onerous than the Peninsular Malaysian program.

Applicants in the Sarawak program must EITHER 1) show proof of monthly off shore income /government guaranteed pension funds of RM 7,000 for unmarried applicants or RM10,000 for married couples or RM; OR 2) Open a fixed deposit account of RM100, 000 in a bank or financial institution for single individuals or RM150, 000.00 for married couples.

After a period of one year Sarawak MM2H participants who choose to open a fixed deposit account may withdraw up to RM90, 000 (couple) or RM40, 000 (single) for approved expenses relating to the purchase of a house, car, and education of children or for medical purposes. From the second year on participants must maintain a minimum Fixed Deposit balance of RM60,000.

=== Medical report ===
All applicants and their dependents (spouse and children) are required to submit a medical report from any private hospital in Malaysia.

=== Medical insurance ===
Approved participants and dependants (spouse and children) must possess a valid medical insurance policy covering their stay in Malaysia. For those who are unable to get medical insurance because of age, or a pre-existing medical condition, this requirement can be waived.

== Program incentives ==
Participants of the program may enjoy the following incentives:

=== Property purchases ===
Each participant is permitted to purchase residential houses at a minimum price above MYR 1,000,000 each such as Kuala Lumpur and Penang that are pre-approved by the Foreign Investment Committee of Malaysia.

In many other areas the minimum price or purchased property is lower. MM2H Participants in Sarawak may buy residential properties with minimum amount RM600,000 for Kuching Division and RM500,000 for other Division in Sarawak. However the visa issued to Participants of the MM2H Sarawak programme allows the participant to reside anywhere in Malaysia.

=== Vehicle purchase ===
The Government has decided to abolish the tax incentive on the purchase of a new locally assembled vehicle or the import of a pre-owned private vehicle into Malaysia under MM2H Programme. Therefore, this tax incentive will be terminated effective from 1 January 2018. However, Ministry of Finance will give special consideration to MM2H participant with first MM2H’s Visa approved beginning 1 January 2017 until 31 December 2017 to submit complete application via Sistem Maklumat Pengurusan Cukai / Sistem Maklumat Pengurusan Cukai Kerajaan Malaysia not later than 31 December 2018.

=== Domestic helper ===
Each participant is allowed to apply for one maid subject to the prevailing guidelines of the Immigration Department of Malaysia.

=== Identification card ===
The issuance of national ID cards for MM2H participants was suspended until further notice 1 July 2010.

=== Education ===
MM2H participants are allowed to bring their children and step children who are below 21 years old and not married as their dependents. Dependents who intend to continue their schooling in Malaysia are required to apply for a student pass. However, the participants are required to be responsible for all the living costs including study fees for their dependents while living in Malaysia.

=== Tax ===
Tax exemption is given to remittance of offshore pension fund into Malaysia. Foreign-source income is not taxable in Malaysia.

=== Working part-time ===
Over 50 year olds can work part-time (maximum 20 hours a week) subject to approval.

=== Other ===
- Import personal / household items, tax exempted
- Invest in local companies, share market and unit trusts
- Interest gained from bank fixed deposit is tax exempted
- Parents can join under a long-term visa

== Restrictions ==
- Participants are not allowed to work or be employed while staying in Malaysia. Persons wishing to obtain employment visas should apply directly to Immigration Department of Malaysia.
- Participants should not participate in activities that can be considered sensitive to the local people and/or a threat to the security of the country.
- Citizens of countries that are not recognised by Malaysia including Israel are not allowed to participate.

== Application procedure ==
Application can be made via any of the following channels.

=== Authorised sponsor companies ===
Application can be made through a number of private Malaysian companies, known as "sponsors", which offer application and follow-up services to foreigners. While the fees charged and services rendered can vary drastically from one sponsor to another, only authorised companies licensed by the Ministry of Tourism can provide such services to MM2H participants. (All sponsor licenses previously issued by the Immigration Department of Malaysia are no longer valid).

The Sarawak MM2H program does not allow the use of commercial "sponsors" or agents. An applicant must be sponsored by a Malaysian originating from Sarawak or a Sarawak Permanent Resident.

=== Personal application ===
As of January 2009, the Malaysian government will allow individual applications. Applicants no longer need to use agents, or other third parties.

Applications for those wishing to reside in Peninsular Malaysia are accepted at the MM2H One-Stop centre in Kuala Lumpur. If the applicant wishes to reside in the states of Sabah or Sarawak, applications need to be sent to the respective immigration offices or MM2H One-Stop centres in either of these states. Details are available on the www.mm2h.gov.my site.

=== Language of documentation ===
All documents can be presented in English. The required documents are listed on the English-language government site, www.mm2h.gov.my.

Applicants can apply themselves (called direct applications), or (except in Sarawak) appoint an agent. There are many agents charging MYR8,000 – MYR10,000 as well as several low-cost agents charging about MYR1,800 per couple.

== Programme suspension ==
On 2 July 2020, Minister of Tourism, Arts and Culture Nancy Shukri announced that the MM2H programme has been temporarily frozen until December 2020 for review and further improvement.
