= Greece–Malaysia relations =

- Greece: Malaysia

Greece–Malaysia relations are foreign relations between Greece and Malaysia. The Greek embassy in Jakarta, Indonesia is also accredited to Malaysia, while the Malaysian embassy in Bucharest, Romania, is also accredited to Greece. There is an Honorary Greek Consulate in Kuala Lumpur headed by Dr. Stellios Plainiotis, the Honorary General Consul. Correspondingly, the Malaysian embassy in Bucharest, Romania is at the same time accredited to Greece and there is a Malaysian Honorary Consulate in Athens. The Honorary Consul is Dr. Savvas Tzanis. The former Yang di-Pertuan Agong (the head of state of Malaysia) and current Raja of Perlis, Tuanku Syed Sirajuddin visited Greece in August 2004 to attend the 2004 Athens Olympics.

== Economic relations ==
Greece exports specialised machinery, non-ferrous metals, tobacco, metal goods, medical products, minerals and fruit, and imports industrial equipment, oil, footwear, paper, rubber, vehicles and telecommunications equipment from Malaysia.

== See also ==
- Foreign relations of Greece
- Foreign relations of Malaysia
