= Malaysia–Tanzania relations =

- Malaysia: Tanzania

Diplomatic mission
- Malaysian High Commission, Nairobi: Tanzanian High Commission, Kuala Lumpur

Envoy
- High Commissioner: High Commissioner

Malaysia–Tanzania relations are the bilateral relations between Malaysia and Tanzania. Malaysia has a high commission in Dar es Salaam, and Tanzania has a high commission in Kuala Lumpur. Both countries are member of the Commonwealth of Nations.

== History and economic relations ==
Both countries were once part of the British Empire and today are working closer in the economic co-operation. In 2013, during a visit of the Tanzanian government to Malaysia, the government were interested on the Malaysian Economic Transformation Programme and thus ready to develop their own ETP with help from Malaysia. Tanzanian government has stated that the implementation of Malaysia's model will be started soon. While during the Malaysian Prime Minister reply visit, a total of 28 companies were brought to the country to increase more investments.

Tanzania also hired Malaysian firms for high technology identity card which would be funded by the Tanzanian government and bank loans. Furthermore, a Malaysian chemicals company had worked together with Tanzanian firms to build a US$800 million chemical plant in Tanzania. A 30-member team of Malaysian experts are also currently coaching 300 Tanzanian experts on how the country can move forward to achieve their 2025 Development Vision. Tanzania are also working with Malaysia to develop their palm oil industry and improve their rail transport, and the country are ready to introduce an Islamic insurance services.
