= Austria–Malaysia relations =

- Austria: Malaysia

Bilateral foreign relations exist between Austria and Malaysia. Austria has an embassy in Kuala Lumpur, and Malaysia has an embassy in Vienna.

== History ==
=== Colonial period ===
History of relations between the two countries can be traced back in 1866 during the Austrian Empire period when the Emperor of Franz Joseph approved the opening of an imperial-royal Honorary Consulate in Penang. However, when the Great Britain declared a war against the Austro-Hungarian Empire in August 1914, the Austrian Consulate was closed down and the last Austrian consul in Penang was detained and deported to Australia by the British administration.

Another related history is located on the island of Borneo when the Austrian-German Consul in Hong Kong named Baron von Overbeck received a parcel of territory in the western coast of northern Borneo after being promoted by an American merchant named Joseph William Torrey in Hong Kong. von Overbeck then depart to Brunei to renewed the concession from the Temenggong of Brunei, and a similar treaty from the Sultanate of Sulu on 22 January 1878. To finance his plans for the territory, von Overbeck got financial backing from the Dent brothers (Alfred and Edward). However, after a high effort to promote the territory to the Austrian and German governments, he was unable to get any attention from the two to conquer the territory. Overbeck later withdrew in 1879, leaving it to Alfred Dent to manage the territory.

=== Present ===
The Austrian make a first formal diplomatic relations on 6 August 1962. In 1967, Austria established its Honorary Consulate in Kuala Lumpur and between 1973 and 1974, both the Austrian Embassy in Kuala Lumpur and Malaysian Embassy in Vienna were opened.

== Economic relations ==
In 2005, Malaysia and Singapore were the main trade partner for Austria, with Malaysia becoming Austria's most important partner in Southeast Asia. Austria's main investment in Malaysia lies mostly in the energy and natural resources sectors. The 2008 financial crisis had an impact to the trade relations with a decrease by 30% in 2009, but improved after the visit of President of Austria Heinz Fischer in 2011. Since 1976, several agreements have been signed between the two countries.

== See also ==
- Foreign relations of Austria
- Foreign relations of Malaysia
