= Malaysia–Senegal relations =

- Malaysia: Senegal

Diplomatic mission
- Malaysian Embassy, Dakar: Senegalese Embassy, Kuala Lumpur

Malaysia–Senegal relations refers to the bilateral relations between Malaysia and Senegal. Malaysia has an embassy in Dakar, and Senegal has an embassy in Kuala Lumpur.

== History ==
The embassy of Malaysia in Dakar was opened in 1992 to enhance the political, economic and social-cultural links between the two countries. In 2011, the Senegal government purchased land in Putrajaya to build their embassy. On 17 January 2019, Malaysian Prime Minister Mahathir Mohamad held talks with Senegal's President Macky Sall after his arrival Dakar to attend a conference on Africa.

In 2024, Malaysia's total trade with Senegal reached RM 1.37 billion, comprising RM1.35 billion in exports and RM14.1 million in imports.

== Economic relations ==
In 2008, the total trade between the two countries was just $15 million but both countries are now in the process to boost their economic co-operation. Several agreements such as promotion and protection on investments and development in power generation and construction has been signed, and the Malaysian company of IRIS has a contract in supplying electronic transport system (EPS) in Senegal.

Malaysia has provided Senegal in the areas of agricultural development, the fight against poverty and on the Islamic finance. Other trade opportunities for Malaysian investors in Senegal were also available in the areas of telecommunication, power generations and construction. Senegal had sees Malaysia as a model to develop their country with many construction projects in Senegal are now been working with the Malaysian counterparts. In 2018, the two signed a memorandum of understanding (MoU) on tourism co-operation, with Senegal also expressed interest to sharing their expertise to develop Malaysian football.

== Education relations ==
In 2013, there are 50 Senegalese living in Malaysia with most of them are university students who pursue education particularly on the Islamic finance.
