= Malaysia–Mongolia relations =

- Malaysia: Mongolia

Malaysia–Mongolia relations refers to bilateral foreign relations between Malaysia and Mongolia. Neither country has a resident ambassador. Malaysia has an honorary consulate in Ulaanbaatar, and Mongolia honorary consulate in Bangkok was accredited to Malaysia.

== History ==
Diplomatic relations between the two countries were established on 8 September 1971. Since 1994, several visits has been made by Mongolia with the former Prime Minister Puntsagiin Jasrai making a visit in 1994, the Foreign Minister Luvsangiin Erdenechuluun in 2002, and another former Prime Minister Nambaryn Enkhbayar in 2003 during the 13th NAM Summit. While the Malaysian visit is only by the former Foreign Minister Syed Hamid Albar in 2003.

== Economic relations ==
Also an agreement on avoidance of double taxation and the prevention of fiscal evasion has been signed since 1995.

== Murder of Mongolian citizen in Malaysia ==
Mongolia has not presented any ambassador to Malaysia for seven years since 2006 due to the murder of a Mongolian citizen in the country, but later decided to appoint an ambassador in 2014 as it was necessary to providing requirements to many Mongolian students studying in the country.

On 18 May 2018, Mongolian president Khaltmaagiin Battulga has urged new Malaysian Prime Minister Mahathir Mohamad to reopen investigations into the murder of a Mongolian model. In his congratulatory message to Mahathir on his appointment as Malaysia's seventh prime minister, Battulga described the 2006 murder as a "grave crime".

In July 2018, Malaysia’s ambassador to China who is concurrently accredited to Mongolia, Zainuddin Yahya, said Malaysia is working to revive bilateral ties with Mongolia.
