= The Gambia–Malaysia relations =

Malaysia–The Gambia relations

- Malaysia: Gambia

Malaysia–The Gambia relations refers to bilateral foreign relations between the two countries, Malaysia and The Gambia. Malaysian embassy in Dakar, Senegal is accredited to The Gambia while Gambian embassy in Abu Dhabi, United Arab Emirates is accredited to Malaysia. The relations are friendly and warm.

Both The Gambia and Malaysia are part of the Commonwealth of Nations and are members of the Organisation of Islamic Cooperation.

== Economic relations ==
In 1974, The Gambia was willing to sell its groundnut oil to Malaysia in exchange for palm oil. While in 1991, The Gambia seeks Malaysian aid to boost its rice production. Until now, relations between the two countries are mainly conducted in technical assistance such as in the field of education and training. The Government of Malaysia had encouraged companies from The Gambia to explore possible collaboration and joint ventures with the Malaysian companies for the mutual benefit of the two countries. As The Gambia has been accorded the honour to host the Organisation of Islamic Cooperation (OIC) Summit in 2018, the government of The Gambia seeks the support of the Malaysian government and people and invites Malaysian investors to invest in the country. The Gambia also sought the support of Malaysian authorities to provide technical support to The Gambia in a bid to strengthen the country's Sharia'h court system.
