= Malaysia–Mexico relations =

- Malaysia: Mexico

The nations of Malaysia and Mexico established diplomatic relations in 1974. Both nations are members of the Asia-Pacific Economic Cooperation, Forum of East Asia–Latin America Cooperation and the United Nations.

== History ==
In August 1966, diplomats from Malaysia and Mexico met in Washington, D.C., United States to discuss the possibility of establishing diplomatic relations. On 27 March 1974 diplomatic relations were formally established between the two nations. In the beginning, neither nation had a resident diplomatic mission. Mexico was accredited to Malaysia from its embassy in Jakarta, Indonesia while Malaysia was accredited to Mexico from its embassy in Washington, D.C. In 1985, Mexico opened an honorary consulate in Kuala Lumpur. In October 1985, after the coronation of King Iskandar of Johor; both nations commenced discussion of opening resident diplomatic missions in each other's capitals, respectively. In October 1991, Mexico opened an embassy in Kuala Lumpur. In 1992, Malaysia opened an embassy in Mexico City.

In September 1991, Prime Minister Mahathir Mohamad paid an official visit to Mexico becoming the first Malaysian head-of-state to visit Mexico. During his visit to Mexico, several agreements were signed between both nations, in particular Malaysia's support for Mexico to join the Asian-Pacific Economic Cooperation. In November 1998, Mexican President Ernesto Zedillo paid a visit to Malaysia to attend the 10th APEC summit hosted in Kuala Lumpur. In October 2002, Deputy Prime Minister Abdullah Ahmad Badawi paid a visit to Los Cabos, Mexico to participate in the 14th APEC Summit.

In July 2010, Mexican Foreign Minister Patricia Espinosa paid a visit to Malaysia. In 2019, both nations held their first meeting for bilateral political consultations in Mexico City attended by Secretary-General of the Malaysian Foreign Ministry, Sri Muhammad Shahrul Ikram Bin Yaacob. During the political consultations, both nations discussed for better market access, including for Mexican Halal-certified products in Malaysia. They also agreed on joint promotion in the geographic regions where each one has the most experience.

In 2024, both nations celebrated 50 years of diplomatic relations.

== High-level visits ==
High-level visits from Malaysia to Mexico

- Prime Minister Mahathir Mohamad (1991)
- Deputy Prime Minister Abdullah Ahmad Badawi (2002)
- Foreign Secretary General Sri Muhammad Shahrul Ikram Bin Yaacob (2019)

High-level visits from Mexico to Malaysia

- President Ernesto Zedillo (1998)
- Foreign Undersecretary Lourdes Aranda (2009)
- Foreign Minister Patricia Espinosa (2010)
- Secretary of the Economy Bruno Ferrari García de Alba (2012)
- Foreign Undersecretary Carlos de Icaza (2016)

== Bilateral agreements ==
Both nations have signed several bilateral agreements such as an Agreement on a joint co-operation between Malaysian and Mexican companies to refine palm oil (1991); Agreement on Credit and Reciprocal Payments between the Bank Negara Malaysia and Bank of Mexico (1991); Agreement on Air Transportation (1992); Memorandum of Understanding in Telecommunications Cooperation (1994) and a Memorandum of Understanding in Agricultural Cooperation (1994).

== Trade relations ==
In 2018, both nations became signatories of the Comprehensive and Progressive Agreement for Trans-Pacific Partnership. In 2023, two-way trade between both nations amounted to US$12.4 billion. Malaysia's main exports to Mexico include: electronic integrated circuits, telephones and mobile phones, parts and accessories for machines, parts and accessories for motor vehicles, copper tubes, petroleum, and chemical based products. Mexico's main exports to Malaysia include: telephones and mobile phones, data processing machines, copper ores and concentrates, iron and steel, parts for railways, fish, and alcohol.

Malaysian multinational companies such as Petronas and Sapura Energy (among others) operate in Mexico. Mexican multinational companies such as Binbit, Cemex, Gruma and Kidzania (among others) operate in Malaysia.

== Resident diplomatic missions ==
- Malaysia has an embassy in Mexico City.
- Mexico has an embassy in Kuala Lumpur.

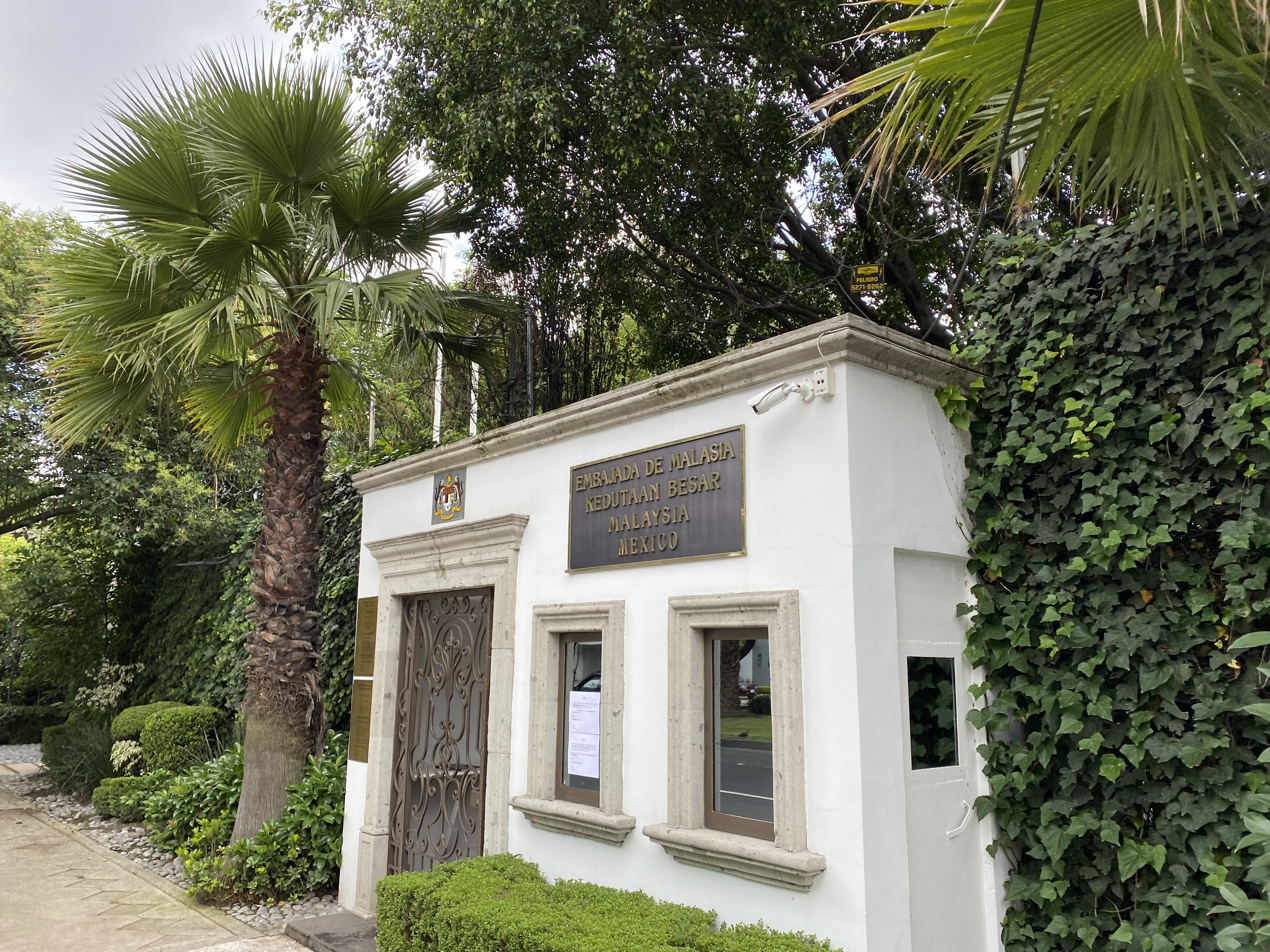
Embassy of Malaysia in Mexico City

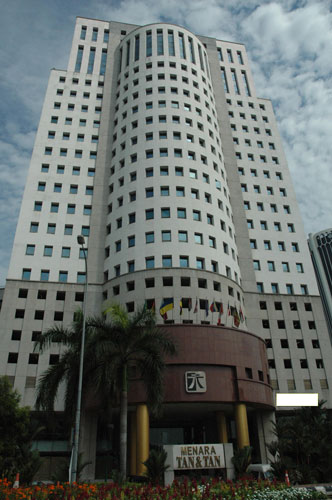
Menara Tan & Tan building hosting the Embassy of Mexico in Kuala Lumpur
