= Malaysia–Yemen relations =

- Malaysia: Yemen

Malaysia–Yemen relations are foreign relations between Malaysia and Yemen. Malaysia formerly had an embassy in Sana'a, of which its operations had been relocated to Muscat, Oman (due to the Yemeni Civil War) and Yemen has an embassy in Kuala Lumpur.

== History ==
The relations between the two countries can be traced back on the 15th century, with many Hadhrami people playing an important role during the Islamisation of the Malay people. This also proved with the current culture of Malaysian Muslim in the present day resembles an Arab culture.

=== Yemeni Civil War ===
Since the outbreak of the Yemeni Civil War in 2015, Malaysia was added into the coalition led by Saudi Arabia to deter Houthis, though Malaysian involvement is minimal. There has been criticism over Malaysia's involvement in the war.

== Economic relations ==
Currently, both countries in the process to enhance bilateral trades. In 2013, the bilateral trade stood over U$200 million with the major import from Yemen such as seafood products, coffee, honey, leather and fruits while the export from Malaysia are the cooking oil which Malaysia consider as the biggest producers and exporters to Yemen and also to the Middle East. Both countries also has signed a joint commission and promote bilateral relations in higher education.

== See also ==
- Arab Malaysians
