= Croatia–Malaysia relations =

- Croatia: Malaysia

Croatia–Malaysia relations refers to bilateral foreign relations between Croatia and Malaysia. Croatia has an embassy in Kuala Lumpur, and Malaysia has an embassy in Zagreb.

== History ==
Diplomatic relations between two countries were established on 4 May 1992 after Croatia declared independence from Yugoslavia. Malaysia opened its embassy in Zagreb in July 1994 while Croatia opened its embassy in Kuala Lumpur in November 1995. Malaysia also contributed in the peacekeeping missions during the War in Yugoslavia.

== Economic relations ==
In 2008, the total trade between the two countries amounted to only $70 million. Currently, co-operation are only limited to the exchange of support in multilateral fields such as supporting each other's candidatures in various international organisations, co-operation in higher education, training and sports. Former Croatian President, Stjepan Mesić has said that he believe Malaysia should be one of the Croatian main partners in Southeast Asia and the co-operation between the two countries should be expand to other sectors. In 2002, an agreement on avoidance of double taxation and fiscal evasion has been signed which takes effect on 2005.

== Resident diplomatic missions ==
- Croatia has an embassy in Kuala Lumpur.
- Malaysia has an embassy in Zagreb.

== See also ==
- Foreign relations of Croatia
- Foreign relations of Malaysia
- Yugoslavia and the Non-Aligned Movement
