= Finland–Malaysia relations =

- Finland: Malaysia

Finland–Malaysia relations are the bilateral relations between Finland and Malaysia. Finland has an embassy in Kuala Lumpur, and Malaysia has an embassy in Helsinki.

== History ==
Diplomatic relations between the two countries have been established since 1972 with the first Finnish diplomatic mission opening in 1980. In 2004, the embassy of Malaysia was opened in Helsinki.

== Economic relations ==
The bilateral trade between the two countries has kept growing to an annual level of about €500 million. In 1993, both Finland and Malaysia have signed a document for the promotion of investments in Helsinki, while the agreement to avoid double taxation and prevention of fiscal evasion with respect to taxes on income became effective in 1988. In 2013, a Finnish data erasure company has expanded its operations to Malaysia, while the Finnish Minister of Education visited Malaysia with the hope of making export products based on the educational system, such as maths games. Many Finnish people have also chosen Malaysia as one of their tourism destinations. There is also a Malaysian Finnish Business Council.

== Resident diplomatic missions ==
- Finland has an embassy in Kuala Lumpur.
- Malaysia has an embassy in Helsinki.
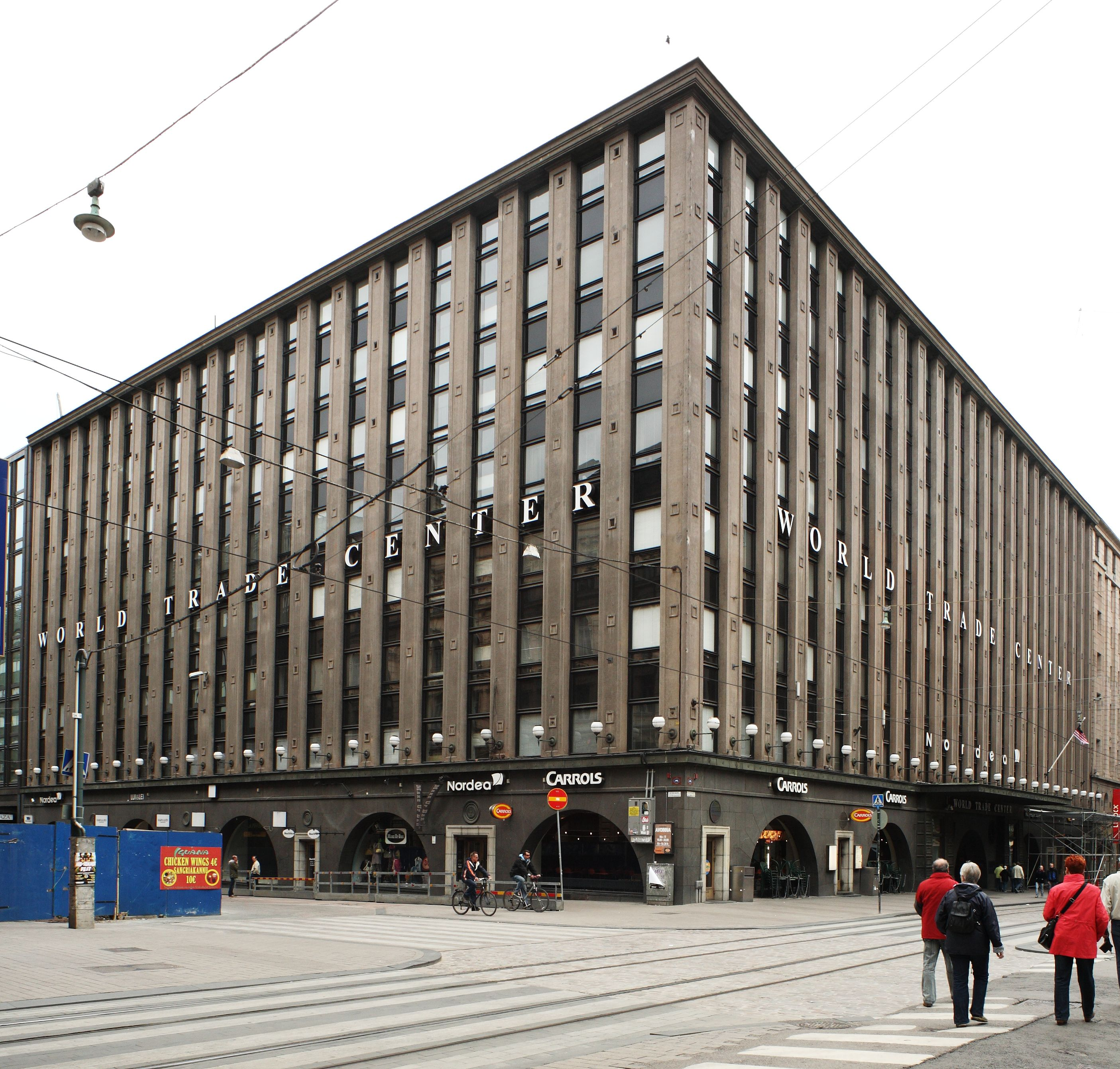
Embassy of Malaysia in Helsinki

== See also ==
- Foreign relations of Finland
- Foreign relations of Malaysia
