= Malaysia–Seychelles relations =

- Malaysia: Seychelles

Malaysia–Seychelles relations refers to the bilateral relations between Malaysia and Seychelles. Seychelles formerly maintained a high commission in Subang Jaya, which was later closed and replaced by an honorary consulate. Malaysia maintains diplomatic representation through a non-resident ambassador in Harare, Zimbabwe. Both countries are full members of the Commonwealth of Nations.

== History ==
The historical connection between the two nations dates back to the British colonial era. In 1877, a group of Malay warriors from Perak, alongside their Sultan, Abdullah Muhammad Shah II, were exiled to the island of Mahé. The deportation followed their alleged involvement in the assassination of the British Resident J.W.W. Birch. The Sultan lived on the island for sixteen years before being granted permission to return to Malaya, laying an early foundation for Malay cultural heritage in the Seychelles.

== Economic and educational relations ==
Bilateral trade developments expanded significantly during the late 1980s. Historically relying on indirect channels via ports in Singapore, Seychelles actively pursued direct maritime trade routes with Malaysia to acquire goods more efficiently. In 1988, both nations signed an agreement to promote cooperation across education, culture, sports, and media sectors. Malaysia serves as a key supplier of raw timber and wood products used in Seychellois construction, along with palm oil and cereal products. Conversely, Seychelles primarily exports processed fish, canned tuna, and maritime assets—including commercial fishing vessels, marine electronics, and industrial processing machinery—to Malaysia.

Malaysian commercial footprint includes hospitality and property investments, notably by the Berjaya Group, which operates resort infrastructure on the islands. Tourism partnership frameworks were also established to support joint regional market relevance.

Educational and environmental exchange has evolved through partnerships between the Seychellois government and Malaysian institutions. The Agency for National Human Resource Development handles ongoing tertiary student placements within Malaysian universities. Bilateral agreements with institutions such as Quest International University (QIU) in Perak facilitate degree pathways for the Seychelles Institute of Agriculture and Horticulture alongside joint initiatives in climate-smart farming, capacity building, and environmental biotechnology.
