= Malaysia–Romania relations =

- Malaysia: Romania

Malaysia–Romania relations are foreign relations between Malaysia and Romania. Romania has an embassy in Kuala Lumpur and Malaysia has an embassy in Bucharest.

== History ==
Following the establishment of diplomatic relations with the Soviet Union, Malaysia also expanded its relations with other Eastern European countries such as Poland, Hungary, the Czech Republic, the German Democratic Republic, Yugoslavia, and Romania. Relations between the two countries were established on 22 March 1969.

In 2024, the two nations celebrated the 55th anniversary of diplomatic relations with various events, including the inauguration of a 'Romania Garden' in Penampang, Sabah, and an art exhibition at the Universiti Pendidikan Sultan Idris. In January 2025, two significant bilateral treaties—the Extradition Treaty and the Treaty on Mutual Assistance in Criminal Matters—entered into force, having been originally signed in Kuala Lumpur in December 2021.

== Economic relations ==
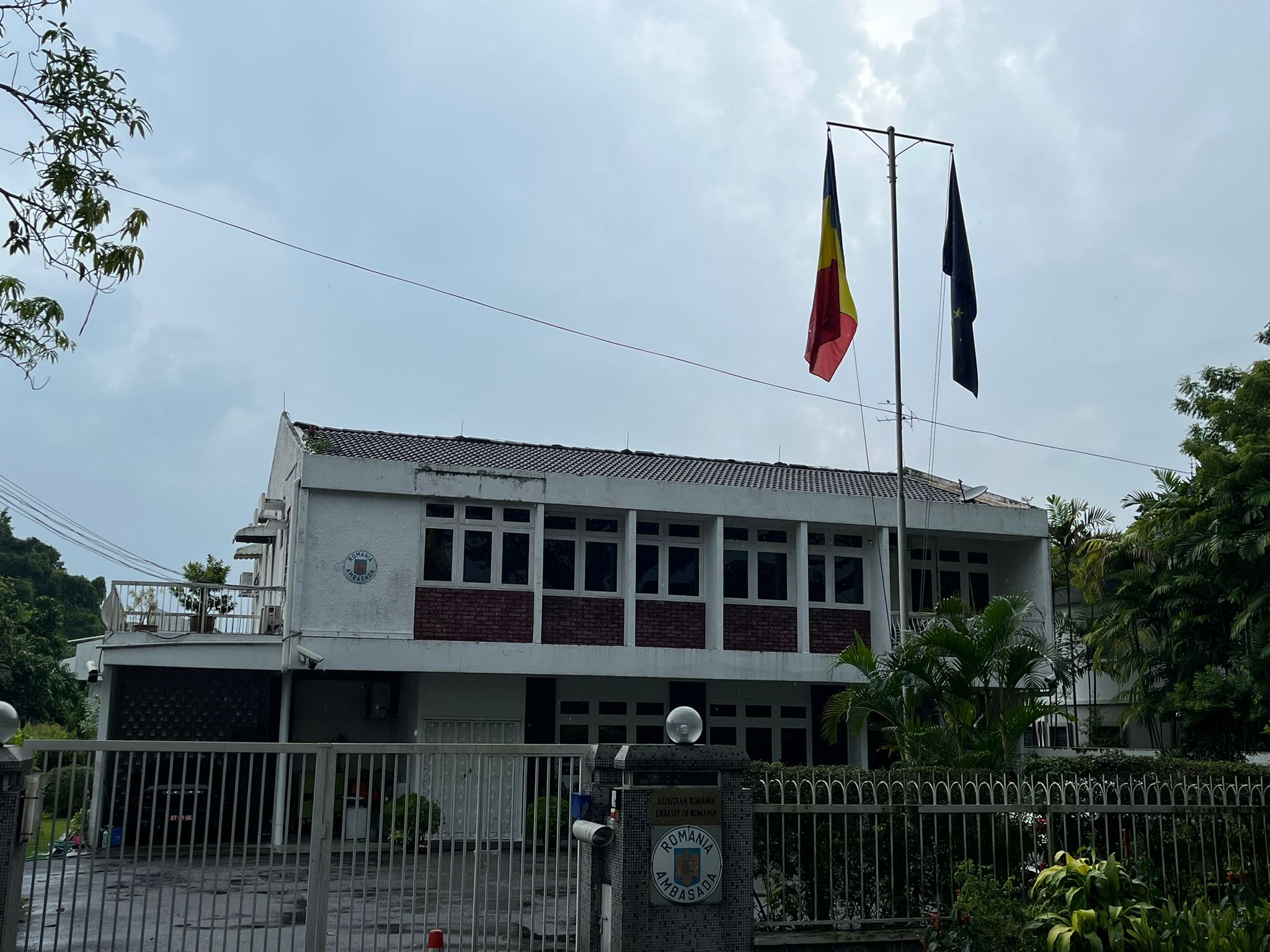
Embassy of Romania in Kuala Lumpur

In 2011, the total trade stood at $140 million, a jump from the $103 million in 2010. In 2013, trade relations recorded a total of $115.12 million, with Romanian exports consisting of furniture, metals, chemicals, lumber, wood, metal products, machinery, and electrical equipment, while Malaysian exports included natural rubber and rubber products, tin, cocoa, computer equipment, and electronics products. Both countries are in the process of boosting economic relations, and the Romanian government has shown interest in cooperating with Malaysia to develop an entry port for palm oil into Romania third largest city, Constanța. Nine agreements on the economic sector have been signed between the two countries.

== Educational relations ==
In 2013, a framework agreement was signed between 1 Decembrie 1918 University and the National University of Malaysia. As of 2014, there are 120 Malaysian students in Romania, with most pursuing medicine.

== Romanians in Malaysia ==
Around 100 Romanian citizens reside in Malaysia, with most of them in the federal territory of Kuala Lumpur and the surrounding state of Selangor.

== See also ==
- Foreign relations of Malaysia
- Foreign relations of Romania
