= Malaysia–Spain relations =

- Malaysia: Spain

Malaysia–Spain relations are the bilateral foreign relations between Malaysia and Spain. Malaysia has an embassy in Madrid, and Spain has an embassy in Kuala Lumpur.

== History ==
Spain established a diplomatic relations with Malaysia on 12 May 1967 and both the Malaysian and Spanish embassy were opened in 1986. A first state visit was made by the Malaysian ninth Yang di-Pertuan Agong of Azlan Shah in July 1992 while the King of Spain Juan Carlos with Queen Sofía visit Malaysia on 4 April 1995.

== Economic relations ==
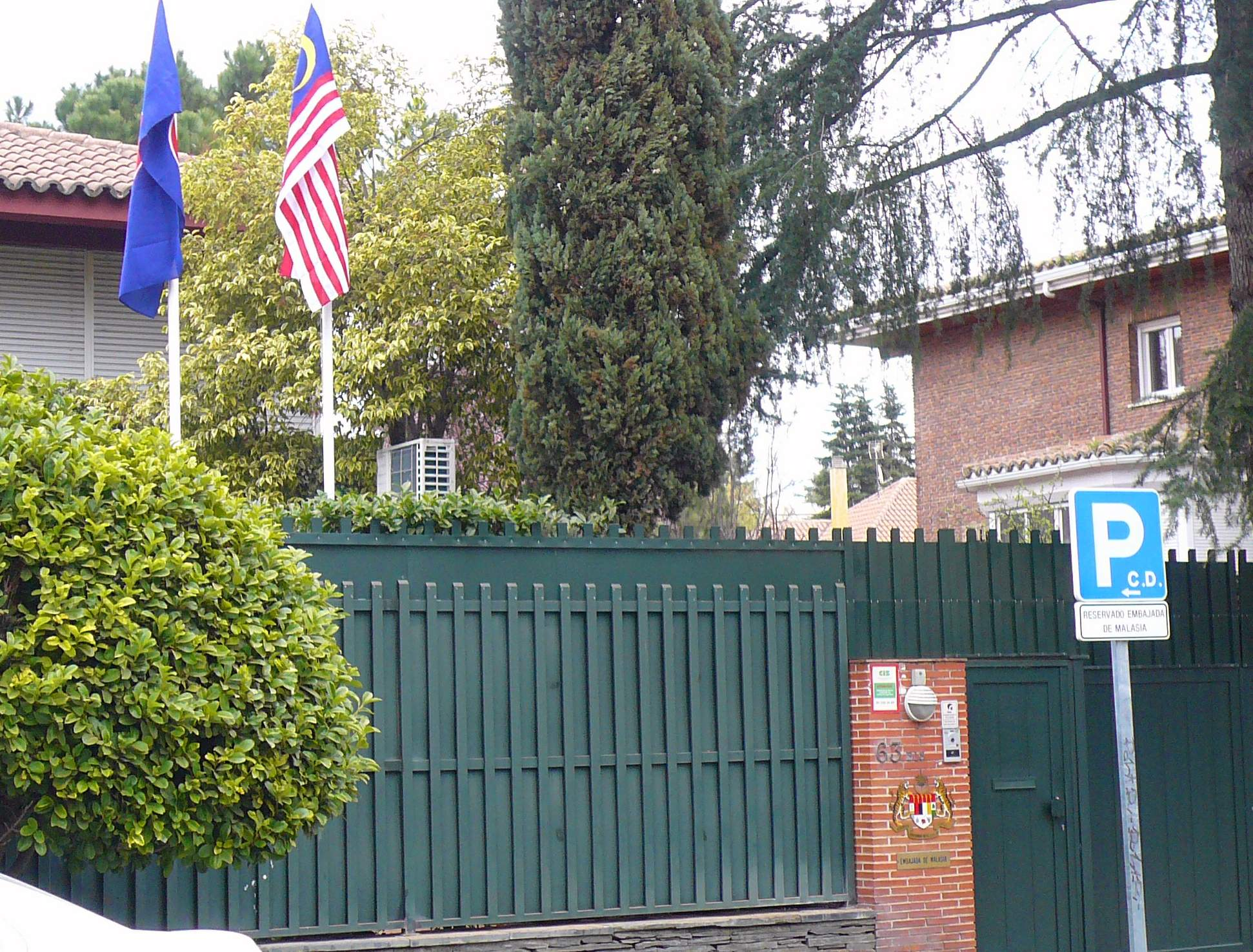
Embassy of Malaysia in Madrid

In 2011, the total Malaysian exports to Spain stood at $620 million while Spanish exports to Malaysia were worth around $320 million. Malaysia is where the largest Spanish investment in Southeast Asia is mostly concentrated with a large presence of Spanish companies while the presence of Malaysian companies in Spain is relatively small. One of the Spanish companies, GMV, is also involved in the development of the proposed high-speed train between Kuala Lumpur and Singapore. Major Spanish exports to Malaysia include electrical machinery, iron and steel, fertilisers, chemicals and textiles while major Malaysian exports to Spain include rubber, palm oil and electrical device components. Both countries were also in the process to increase trade relations especially in tourism and the marine industry. An agreement on avoidance of double taxation and fiscal evasion has been signed between the two countries. There is also a Malaysian Spanish Chamber of Commerce and Industry.

== Resident diplomatic missions ==
- Malaysia has an embassy in Madrid.
- Spain has an embassy in Kuala Lumpur.

== See also ==
- Foreign relations of Malaysia
- Foreign relations of Spain
