= Malaysia–Norway relations =

- Malaysia: Norway

Malaysia–Norway relations refers to foreign relations between Malaysia and Norway. Malaysia has a consulate in Oslo, while Norway has an embassy in Kuala Lumpur.

== Economic relations ==
There is a Malaysia Norway Business Council to provide a forum for discussion and exchanging views on business conditions, both domestic and international for Malaysian and Norwegian firms. Both Norway and Malaysia are oil-producing nations and the petroleum industry has been the most important pillar in their bilateral relationship. Both countries also co-operate in agricultural trade. Currently, there are fifty Norwegian companies operating in Malaysia. In 2006, the exports to Malaysia worth around RM150 million, while imports from Malaysia were worth around RM338.7 million. The trade increase significantly and by 2017, Malaysian exports to Norway value of kr2.35 billion (RM1.25 billion) while Norwegian exports to Malaysia were worth kr1.65 billion (RM879.7 million). In the same year, around 50 Norwegian companies had their presence in Malaysia. Norway also in the process to establishing a free trade agreement with Malaysia through the European Free Trade Association (EFTA).

== Security relations ==
Norway also provides Malaysia with military equipment and defence services.

As of May 2026, relations were strained with Norway's revocation of the Naval Strike Missile system's export licence intended for the Royal Malaysian Navy. Malaysian Defence Minister Mohamed Khaled Nordin publicly criticised the decision during the 2026 Shangri-La Dialogue, describing it as a setback to bilateral relations.
