= Korean Malaysian =

Korean Malaysian or Malaysian Korean may refer to:

- Malaysia–North Korea relations
- Malaysia–South Korea relations
- Koreans in Malaysia
- Malaysians in North Korea
- Malaysians in South Korea
- Multiracial people of mixed Malay and Korean descent
