= Malaysian South Korean =

Malaysian South Korean or South Korean Malaysian may refer to:

- Malaysians in South Korea
- South Koreans in Malaysia
- Malaysia–South Korea relations
- Multiracial people of Malaysian and South Korean descent
