= List of international prime ministerial trips made by Anwar Ibrahim =

This is a list of international prime ministerial trips made by Anwar Ibrahim, the 10th prime minister of Malaysia, Anwar Ibrahim has made 63 international trips to 40 countries during his premiership, which began on 24 November 2022.

== Summary ==
The number of visits per country where Prime Minister Anwar traveled are:

- One: Australia, Bahrain, Bangladesh, Belgium, Cambodia, Ethiopia, France, Germany, Italy, Kazakhstan, Kenya, Kyrgyzstan, Maldives, Pakistan, Peru, South Africa, Switzerland, Timor-Leste, Turkmenistan, and the United Kingdom
- Two: Brazil, Egypt, India, Laos, Qatar, South Korea, the United Arab Emirates, the United States, Uzbekistan, and Vietnam
- Three: Japan, Russia, and Turkey
- Four: Brunei and the Philippines
- Five: Saudi Arabia, Singapore, and Thailand
- Six: China and Indonesia

World map highlighting countries visited by Anwar Ibrahim during his leadership, as of November 2026. One visit Two visits Three visits Four visits Five visits Six visits Seven or more visits Malaysia

== 2023 ==
#	Country	Areas visited	Dates	Details
1	Indonesia	Jakarta	8–9 January	State visit. Met with Indonesian president Joko Widodo in Bogor Palace to discuss issues relating to border demarcation, trade, manpower, palm oil, and the situation in Myanmar. Extensive meetings were also organized to discuss further bilateral issues that will alleviate the relationship between the two countries.
2	Brunei	Bandar Seri Begawan	24–25 January	State visit. Met with Brunei Sultan Hassanal Bolkiah for a four-eyed meeting to assess the progress of ongoing cooperation. He also witnessed the signing of a memorandum of understanding between the Malaysian Investment Development Authority (MIDA) and the Brunei Investment Agency (BIA). The Sultan also hosted a royal banquet for Prime Minister Anwar.
3	Singapore	Central Area	30 January	Invited and met with Singapore president Halimah Yacob and Prime Minister Lee Hsien Loong. He witnessed the signing of a memorandum of understanding to promote cooperation in data, cybersecurity, and the digital economy as well as the two Frameworks for Cooperation in Digital and Green Economy.
4	Thailand	Bangkok	9–10 February	Met with Prime Minister Prayut Chan-o-cha in Bangkok. They discussed about the Muslim separatist insurgency in Thailand's southernmost provinces, which abut Malaysia. They also discussed bilateral issues with the intention of alleviating the bilateral relationship between the two countries.
5	Turkey	Gaziantep, Ankara	14–15 February	Invited and met with Turkish president Recep Tayyip Erdoğan at Gaziantep, which was affected by the strong earthquake disaster. Also visited Malaysian rescue team that was sent there. This instantaneous visit is deemed more of a friendship visit between the two leaders as compared to an official working visit. He then went to Ankara to visit president Recep Tayyip Erdoğan of Republic of Türkiye on his invitation. Anwar reiterated his commitment to Erdoğan to allow the rescue team to continue to aid the Turkish counterpart in the search and rescue efforts.
6	Philippines	Manila	1–2 March	The Prime Minister arrived in Manila for his official visit to the Republic of the Philippines. As soon as he arrived in Manila, he visited President Bongbong Marcos and agreed to intensify the investment exchange between the two countries with the focus on halal industries, food security, agriculture and digital economy. The issue of Myanmar was also discussed at length. He went to the Rizal Park to lay a wreath in honour of José Rizal. He then went to the University of the Philippines to give a lecture on the '30 Years After The Asian Renaissance: Strategic Takeaways for ASEAN'.
7	Saudi Arabia	Makkah, Madinah & Jeddah	22–24 March	The Prime Minister arrived in Makkah to perform umrah and received a courtesy call from both the Secretaries-General of Organisation of Islamic Cooperation (OIC) Hissein Brahim Taha and of Muslim World League (MWL) Muhammad bin Abdul Karim Issa, broke fast with Malaysians residing in Saudi Arabia, held engagement sessions with the chairmen of both the National Chamber of Commerce and Jeddah Chamber of Commerce as well as business communities to invite them to invest more in Malaysia, met with the Malaysian diaspora, held a press conference to state his openness on restarting talks on building the King Salman Centre for International Peace.
8	Cambodia	Phnom Penh	27 March	The Prime Minister arrived im Phnom Penh to hold a bilateral meeting with Prime Minister Hun Sen to discuss various regional and international issues and a joint press conference to announce the results of the discussion before witnessing the signing of two memorandum of understanding (MoU) between the Malaysian and Cambodian governments. He also thanked Hun Sen for help in bringing back Malaysian job scam victims. The Prime Minister had an audience with King Norodom Sihamoni and meeting with President of the Senate Say Chhum, attended a Ramadan Iftar (breaking-of-the-fast) dinner with academicians and the Muslim community in Cambodia and witnessed the symbolic handing over of 1,500 copies of the Quran translation in Khmer and English from Malaysia to Cambodia as well as performing the Tarawih prayers.
9	China	Hainan & Beijing	29 March – 1 April	The Prime Minister flew to Hainan to deliver a speech at Boao Forum for Asia (BFA). He also shared his thoughts at the conference themed "An Uncertain World: Solidarity and Cooperation for Development and Challenges", and held a meeting with the top leadership of China Communications Construction Company (CCCC) in Hainan. He met with Prime Minister of Singapore Lee Hsien Loong. He attended a public lecture at the Tsinghua University. He paid a courtesy call on and held bilateral meetings with General Secretary of the Chinese Communist Party and President Xi Jinping, Premier Li Qiang and Chairman of the Standing Committee of the National People's Congress Zhao Leji in Beijing. He delivered a speech at an iftar event attended by Chinese businesspeople and Muslim community in China. He attended a roundtable meeting with the captains of the industry. He witnessed the signing of 21 memorandums of understanding (MoUs) between Malaysian and Chinese businesses. He attended a welcome banquet hosted by Premier Li Qiang.
10	Laos	Vientiane	26–27 June	The Prime Minister began his official visit by meeting with the Islamic leaders of Laos. Afterward, he met with the Prime Minister of Laos, Sonexay Siphandone, attending a bilateral summit while also witnessing the signing of several MoUs related to transportation, energy, and port-related agreements. He met with the Malaysian diaspora during an event inaugurating the new Malaysian embassy in Vientiane. Before leaving for Kuala Lumpur, the Prime Minister had the opportunity to meet with the President of Laos, Thongloun Sisoulith and the President of the National Assembly of Laos Saysomphone Phomvihane, and had the opportunity to discuss issues related to regional and international importance.
11	Vietnam	Hanoi	20–21 July	The Prime Minister arrived in Hanoi at the invitation of the Prime Minister of Vietnam, Phạm Minh Chính at the outset to discuss issues related to cooperation between the two countries, especially in the areas of investment and trade, agriculture, defense, and security as well as the halal industry. The Prime Minister also witnessed the signing of several MoUs related to the economic, scientific, and technical agreement between both countries as well as between the National Chamber of Commerce and Industry of Malaysia (NCCIM) and Vietnam Chamber of Commerce and Industries (VCCI). He also met with the Malaysian diaspora and the business leaders in Vietnam. On the sidelines of the summit, Prime Minister Anwar also had bilateral summits with the General Secretary of the Communist Party of Vietnam, Nguyễn Phú Trọng, the Chairman of the National Assembly of Vietnam Vương Đình Huệ and the President of Vietnam, Võ Văn Thưởng. On the side of the official visit, he was treated by the Prime Minister of Vietnam to visit the Book Street as well as performing Friday prayer at Al Noor mosque in Hanoi.
12	Indonesia	Jakarta	5–7 September	The Prime Minister arrived in Jakarta with the attention to attend the 43rd ASEAN Summit, ASEAN-China, ASEAN-South Korea, ASEAN-Japan, ASEAN-India, ASEAN-United States, ASEAN-Australia, ASEAN-United Nations and East Asia summits. He began the day by meeting with Haedar Nashir of the Muhammadiyah Islamic society, Dr Adian Husaini of the Indonesian Islamic Propagation Council, Din Syamsuddin of the Indonesian Ulema Council and Khofifah Indar Parawansa, the Governor of East Java. During the summit, the Prime Minister made a strong statement regarding issues such as ASEAN's frankness and centrality, the implementation of the 5-Point Consensus for Myanmar, and ASEAN's outlook on the Indo-Pacific. On the sidelines of the summit, Prime Minister Anwar also had bilateral summits with the Prime Minister of Cambodia, Hun Manet, the President of South Korea, Yoon Suk Yeol, the Prime Minister of Canada, Justin Trudeau, the Prime Minister of Australia, Anthony Albanese, the founder of the World Economic Forum, Klaus Schwab, the Prime Minister of Cook Islands, Mark Brown (Cook Islands), the Secretary-General of the United Nations, António Guterres and the Prime Minister of East Timor, Xanana Gusmão.
13	Singapore	Central Area	13 September	The Prime Minister visited Singapore to speak at the 10th Milken Institute Asia Summit 2023. On his second working visit this time, he met with the Prime Minister Lee Hsien Loong for an afternoon tea to discuss the latest developments regarding both countries' bilateral issues. He also met with the Foreign Minister, Vivian Balakrishnan during the high tea session.
14	China	Nanning	17 September	The Prime Minister attended and spoke at the 20th China–Association of Southeast Asian Nations (ASEAN) Expo (CAExpo) 2023 and the China–ASEAN Business and Investment Summit (CABIS), officiated the Malaysian Pavilion at CAExpo, had a bilateral meeting and luncheon with the Premier of China Li Qiang to discuss the China–Malaysia relations and exchange views on regional and international issues of mutual concern as well as holding an engagement session with the corporate giants of China.
15	United States	New York City	19–26 September	The Prime Minister arrived in New York to attend the general debate of the seventy-eighth session of the United Nations General Assembly in New York City. Upon his arrival, the Prime Minister held a bilateral summit with President Recep Tayyip Erdoğan of Republic of Türkiye that discussed issues concerning Islamophobia and Malaysia Airports's handling and further investments in Istanbul Sabiha Gökçen International Airport. In the evening of his first day, Anwar Ibrahim held a bilateral summit with President Ebrahim Raisi of Iran that discussed issues concerning cooperation in the fields of economy, education, food security, science, and technology. He ends his first day by holding a bilateral meeting with President Ranil Wickremesinghe of Sri Lanka. On his second day, Prime Minister Anwar Ibrahim met with several business leaders from the United States listed in the Fortune Global 500. In presence are also the US-ASEAN Business Council (USABC) and the United States Chamber of Commerce (USCC). He then attended the Invest Malaysia New York that was organized by Bursa Malaysia with the presence of almost 200 business delegates. He also agreed to a conversation with the Council on Foreign Relations that was moderated by Mariko Silver with introductory remarks by then the 70th United States Secretary of the Treasury, Robert Rubin. He also held several other bilateral summits with the new Thailand Prime Minister, Srettha Thavisin, the Prime Minister of Iraq, Mohammed Shia' Al Sudani, and the U.S. Special Presidential Envoy for Climate, John Kerry. He then finished his second-day visit by meeting with several top companies such as Google, Boeing, Medtronic, and Siemens Healthineers. In his general debate address, Prime Minister Anwar Ibrahim reiterated the firmness of the country and the people of Malaysia regarding the challenges of the modern world. The Prime Minister also addressed issues regarding the spirit of alliance and multilateral cooperation, the emergence of a new form of racism characterized by xenophobia, negative profiling and stereotyping of Muslims, Quran desecration, the Israeli–Palestinian conflict, the Russian invasion of Ukraine, Myanmar and Afghanistan. He ended his visit by delivering a Friday sermon at the Islamic Cultural Center of New York.
16	United Arab Emirates	Dubai	5–6 October	The Prime Minister had a short working visit to the Emirates. However, the Prime Minister was able to make huge steps in investment from the Gulf country amounting to RM40.6 billion (US$8.6 billion). He held several meetings with the likes of President Mohamed bin Zayed Al Nahyan, senior ministers of the Cabinet of the United Arab Emirates as well as Abu Dhabi Investment Authority. He began his visit by meeting with President Mohamed bin Zayed Al Nahyan at the Qasr Al Watan palace. An investment understanding agreement between Malaysian Investment Development Authority (MIDA) and the UAE International Investment Council was also established. Various MoUs were also signed related to the scope of renewable energy and trade and investment. He then continued the visit by meeting with the captains of industry of the country including Abu Dhabi Investment Authority. Before ending his trip by meeting with the Malaysian diaspora, he performed Friday prayer at the Sheikh Zayed Grand Mosque.
17	Saudi Arabia	Riyadh	19–20 October	The Prime Minister attended the 1st ASEAN-GCC Summit in Riyadh as the first event of his official visit to Saudi Arabia. There, he reiterated the Israeli–Palestinian conflict is more than vital to be discussed in upholding the international principles and laws towards the human rights violations and genocidal intentions of the Palestinians. The Prime Minister commended the Kingdom of Saudi Arabia's initiative regarding Palestine at the Organization of Islamic Cooperation level a few days before. Prime Minister Anwar Ibrahim proposes the ASEAN-GCC Comprehensive Economic Partnership Agreement (CEPA) as a step forward which also serves as the first-ever free trade relationship agreement (FTA) between both organizations. As per other official visits, he also met with the Malaysian diaspora in Riyadh. Afterward, he also spent some time with the late Abdul Hamid AbuSulayman's family, who is also a renowned Islamic thinker who was also the former Rector of the International Islamic University Malaysia from 1989 to 1999. He also had the opportunity to visit the office of the Muslim World League. On his second day, the Prime Minister began the day by meeting with Saudi Aramco. He met with Aramco's president, Amin H. Nasser, accompanied by the Trade Minister, Majid bin Abdullah Al Qasabi. The discussion focused on the investment and trade relationship between the two countries, and the relationship is expected to improve through the establishment of a Joint Committee monitoring it. He also received a visit from the Governor of the Public Investment Fund, Yasir Al-Rumayyan. Issues discussed are related to the cooperation between the PIF and Petronas, Khazanah Nasional, Permodalan Nasional Berhad and Employees Provident Fund. He also witnessed various MoU signings between relevant companies regarding Hajj and Umrah as well as in the technology and aviation sectors. He ended his first official visit to the country by meeting the Crown Prince of Saudi Arabia, Mohammed bin Salman. Issues dominating the meeting were such as bilateral issues, the Malaysia-Saudi Arabia Strategic Partnership, the Malaysia-Saudi Arabia Coordination Council (SMCC), and the Saudi Arabia Green Initiative (SGI). Again, the Israeli–Palestinian conflict also covered intensively during the meeting while also inviting the Crown Prince to make an official visit to Malaysia which will be held around January 2024.
17	Turkey	Istanbul	21–22 October	The Prime Minister began his visit by meeting with the Turkish Treasury and Finance Minister, Mehmet Şimşek, to discuss issues related to the global economy. Defense and security aspects were at the forefront of the meeting as well as exploring potential investments in the realm of technology and tourism. The Prime Minister continued the visit by meeting with the Foreign Minister, Hakan Fidan, and İbrahim Kalın of the National Intelligence Organization. The meeting focuses on exploring various spaces to strengthen cooperation between the two countries, especially in geopolitical, defense, and security fields. Ending his visit, Prime Minister Anwar Ibrahim met with his close friend, President Recep Tayyip Erdoğan of Republic of Türkiye for nearly two hours. The meeting focuses on the Israeli–Palestinian conflict with reference made to the rights of Gaza citizens that Israel continues to deny. Both leaders agreed to work together to find the best solutions to the never-ending oppression of the Palestinians. They also opined in efforts to strengthen their bilateral relationship in various aspects, mainly the defense ecosystem.
17	Egypt	Cairo	22–23 October	The Prime Minister began his one-day trip in Cairo by paying a courtesy visit to President Abdel Fattah El-Sisi at the Heliopolis Palace. The meeting was intended to touch on bilateral issues including the major focus on the Israeli–Palestinian conflict. The Prime Minister applauded Egypt's efforts to facilitate the entry of humanitarian and medical aid through the Rafah Border Crossing while also agreeing that both nations should play an extra and decisive role in ensuring justice prevails. The Prime Minister informed that President Abdel Fattah El-Sisi will soon pay an official visit Malaysia early next year. He then continued his visit by meeting with the Grand Imam of al-Azhar, Ahmed el-Tayeb to discuss mainly education-related issues as well as the welfare of 6300 Malaysians in Al-Azhar Al-Sharif. The Prime Minister invited the Grand Imam to Malaysia in hopes of strengthening the flow of wasatiyyah in the curriculum of knowledge and preaching at the regional level. He finished the visit by meeting with the CEO of Red Crescent, Dr Rami Al Nazer to listen to the current briefing on the humanitarian aid planned.
18	Singapore	Central Area	29–30 October	The Prime Minister visited Singapore to attend the 10th Singapore-Malaysia Leaders' Retreat. He met with President Tharman Shanmugaratnam and Prime Minister Lee Hsien Loong. He reaffirmed their strong commitment to this annual engagement platform to discuss ways to enhance bilateral cooperation and issues of mutual concern. He welcomed the good progress made in the ongoing construction of the Johor Bahru-Singapore Rapid Transit System (RTS) Link. He agreed to hold the 11th Retreat in 2024 in Malaysia.
19	Saudi Arabia	Riyadh & Makkah	11–13 November	The Prime Minister attended the 8th Extraordinary Islamic Summit of the Organisation of Islamic Cooperation (OIC) to discuss the ongoing Israeli aggression in Palestine, hosted by Crown Prince Mohammed bin Salman. He then left Riyadh for Jeddah to perform umrah with his wife in Makkah.
19	United States	San Francisco, Berkeley	14–17 November	The Prime Minister attended the 30th Asia Pacific Economic Cooperation (APEC) Economic Leaders' Meeting (AELM). He then took part in the APEC Economic Leaders' Informal Dialogue with distinguished guests from Colombia, Fiji and India. Following this, Anwar engaged in discussions at the APEC Business Advisory Council (ABAC) Dialogue with APEC Economic Leaders and the 2023 APEC CEO Summit. He also participated in the Second Leaders' Meeting of the Indo-Pacific Economic Framework for Prosperity (IPEF). The Prime Minister also had a session with students and scholars at the University of California, Berkeley, through a public lecture. Anwar also held a crucial one-on-one meeting with top American business leaders to explore opportunities for investment and collaboration. He then held discussions with Vietnamese President Võ Văn Thưởng, Peruvian President Dina Boluarte, and Canadian Prime Minister Justin Trudeau. Anwar also hosted a dinner for the Malaysian diaspora and students in San Francisco.
20	Thailand	Sadao	27 November	The Prime Minister conducted a working visit to Sadao in Songkhla province with the purpose of monitoring the progress of the Road Alignment Project that aims to connect Bukit Kayu Hitam Immigration, Customs, Quarantine, and Security (ICQS) in Malaysia with Sadao Customs, Immigration, and Quarantine (CIQ) in Thailand. During his visit, he also convened a meeting with his counterpart, Srettha Thavisin, to discuss pertinent matters related to the project.
21	Japan	Tokyo	15–19 December	The Prime Minister engaged in the ASEAN-Japan Commemorative Summit and later engaged in a bilateral meeting with his counterpart, Fumio Kishida. Both leaders then oversaw the Exchange of Notes regarding the Implementation of the Security Capacity Enhancement Program under Official Security Assistance between the Government of Malaysia and the Government of Japan. Additionally, they endorsed the Memorandum of Cooperation for the Development and Application of Space between the Malaysian Space Agency and the Japan Aerospace Exploration Agency. Anwar then participated in the Asian Zero Emissions Community (AZEC) Leaders Meeting during his visit. He then convened with various industry leaders and members of the Malaysian diaspora residing in Tokyo.
22	Thailand	Phuket	26 December	The Prime Minister engaged in discussions with his counterpart, Srettha Thavisin, regarding the promotion of tourism in Phuket, Langkawi, and other areas in the north of Peninsular Malaysia.

== 2024 ==
#	Country	Areas visited	Dates	Details
23	Brunei	Bandar Seri Begawan	13–14 January	The Prime Minister attended the wedding reception of Prince Abdul Mateen, the son of Sultan and Prime Minister Hassanal Bolkiah.
24	Australia	Melbourne & Canberra	3–7 March	The Prime Minister led the Malaysian delegation at the second Australia-Malaysia Annual Leaders' Meeting (ALM), hosted by Australia on 4 March in Melbourne. He then participated in the ASEAN-Australia Special Summit from 5 to 6 March. During the meeting, Anwar and his counterpart, Anthony Albanese, discussed steps to advance the broad spectrum of cooperation supported by the Comprehensive Strategic Partnership framework. The two leaders also witnessed the exchange of several memorandums of understanding. In Melbourne, the Prime Minister inaugurated the Al-Taqwa Sports Complex, held a round table meeting with industry leaders, conducted one-on-one business meetings with potential investors, gave interviews with international media organisations, and delivered a keynote address at Invest ASEAN Melbourne 2024. Anwar also hosted a dinner for the Malaysian diaspora in Melbourne. He also paid a courtesy call on Australia's governor-general, David Hurley, and delivered a public lecture at the Australian National University in Canberra.
25	Germany	Berlin & Hamburg	10–15 March	The Prime Minister met with Chancellor Olaf Scholz and President Frank-Walter Steinmeier. He addressed the Körber Foundation, a renowned non-profit focusing on social and political matters. Anwar also delivered a keynote speech at the SME Future Day 2024, hosted by the German Association of Small and Medium-Sized Businesses (BVMW). He then convened with industry leaders and potential European investors, conducted interviews with local media outlets, and participated in an iftar ceremony with the Malaysian diaspora in Germany. The Prime Minister then traveled to Hamburg to attend the 101st East Asian Friendship Dinner organised by the German Asia Pacific Business Association. There, he delivered a keynote speech and granted an exclusive interview to the German Press Agency.
26	Saudi Arabia	Riyadh	28–29 April	The Prime Minister attended the plenary session of the Special Meeting on Global Collaboration, Growth and Energy for Development organised by World Economic Forum in Riyadh. Anwar also met with President Paul Kagame of Rwanda, Prime Minister Bisher Khasawneh of Jordan, Patrick Pouyanné of TotalEnergies, Finance Minister Sri Mulyani of Indonesia, Minister Hakan Fidan of Turkey, Prime Minister Shehbaz Sharif of Pakistan, Prime Minister Mohammed bin Abdulrahman Al Thani of Qatar and Crown Prince Mohammed bin Salman of Saudi Arabia.
27	Qatar	Doha	12–14 May	The Prime Minister visited Doha at the invitation of Emir Tamim bin Hamad Al Thani of Qatar. Anwar also met with Hamas' chairman, Ismail Haniyeh, President Andrzej Duda of Poland and attended the Qatar Economic Forum by Bloomberg.
27	Kyrgyzstan	Bishkek	15–16 May	The Prime Minister attended a wreath-laying ceremony at the Ata-Beyit Memorial before departing for the Ala Archa State Residence to join a guard of honour ceremony and a four-eyed meeting with President Sadyr Japarov. Held a press conference prior to meeting Chairman of the Cabinet of Ministers Akylbek Japarov. Participated in a tour and cultural event at the Ala Archa National Park.
27	Kazakhstan	Astana	16 May	The Prime Minister visited the Astana Grand Mosque, accorded an official welcome by President Kassym-Jomart Tokayev at the Ak Orda Presidential Palace before proceeding to participate in a four-eyed meeting and another subsequent meeting involving both sides. Feted to a dinner banquet hosted by Tokayev. Attended a Roundtable Session on the bilateral cooperation in economy, trade and investment. Witnessed the exchanges of MoUs of relevant government agencies and businesses. Extended birthday greetings to Tokayev by presenting him a cake on his 70th birthday.
27	Uzbekistan	Tashkent & Samarkand	17–19 May	The Prime Minister paid a courtesy call and held a meeting with President Shavkat Mirziyoyev to discuss Malaysia–Uzbekistan relations as well as exploring areas of cooperation in the Kuksaroy Presidential Residence. Visited the Independence Monument in Yangi Uzbekistan Park for a wreath-laying ceremony and Imam Hazrati Complex, where the original manuscript of the Caliph Usman Quran (Mashaf Uthmani), the oldest in the world, is kept and displayed. Witnessed the exchanges of six MoUs on bilateral cooperation of various fields. In Samarkand, addressed the High-Level Uzbekistan-Malaysian Business Forum held at the Silk Road Samarkand Tourism Complex.
28	Japan	Tokyo	22–24 May	The Prime Minister participated and delivered a keynote address on the theme of "Asian Leadership in an Uncertain World" in the 29th International Conference on the Future of Asia, commonly known as the Nikkei Conference. Held a bilateral meeting with Prime Minister Fumio Kishida to take stock and discuss ways to strengthen the Japan–Malaysia relations as well as exchanging views on the regional and international issues of mutual interest. Held an interactive session with captains of various industries.
29	Thailand	Narathiwat	3 August	The Prime Minister visited the customs, immigration and quarantine (CIQ) Complex in Golok River. He was welcomed by his counterpart Srettha Thavisin. The primary purpose of the visit was to assess the progress of the bridge upgrade connecting Rantau Panjang and Golok River. Both leaders discussed bilateral issues, including Malaysia-Thailand border matters, connectivity initiatives, and the peace dialogue process in Southern Thailand.
30	India	New Delhi	19–21 August	The Prime Minister arrived in New Delhi at the invitation of his counterpart, Prime Minister Narendra Modi. Anwar connected with local industry leaders, students, and academics, and delivered a lecture titled "Towards a Rising Global South - Leveraging on Malaysia-India Ties" organised by the Indian Council of World Affairs (ICWA).
31	Brunei	Bandar Seri Begawan	25–26 August	The Prime Minister's visit was in conjunction with the 25th Annual Malaysia and Brunei Leaders Talks. Anwar met Sultan Hassanal Bolkiah at Istana Nurul Iman. The two also witnessed the signing of several bilateral instruments.
32	Russia	Vladivostok	4–5 September	The Prime Minister travelled to Vladivostok to attend the Eastern Economic Forum at the invitation of President Vladimir Putin of Russia.
33	Pakistan	Islamabad	2–4 October	The Prime Minister attended a restricted meeting with Prime Minister Shehbaz Sharif and a bilateral meeting between the delegations of both Malaysia and Pakistan. Witnessed the signing and exchanges of two documents between Malaysia External Trade Development Corporation (MATRADE) and Trade Development Authority of Pakistan (TDAP) as well as between Malaysian Communications and Multimedia Commission (MCMC) and Pakistan Telecommunication Authority (TPA). Attended the launch of three books by Muhammad Iqbal that were translated from Persian, Urdu and English languages to the Malay language and a lunch hosted by Shehbaz.
33	Bangladesh	Dhaka	4 October	The Prime Minister visited Bangladesh to meet with Chief Adviser Muhammad Yunus to strengthen the bilateral relations. He also paid a courtesy call on President Mohammed Shahabuddin.
34	Laos	Vientiane	8–11 October	The Prime Minister attended the 44th ASEAN Summit hosted by Prime Minister Sonexay Siphandone. Apart from meeting with ASEAN economic leaders throughout the summit, Prime Minister Anwar Ibrahim also met with Prof Klaus Schwab of the World Economic Forum, Charles Michel of the European Council, Prime Minister Justin Trudeau of Canada, Secretary Antony Blinken of the United States, Deputy Prime Minister Xavier Bettel of Luxembourg
35	Indonesia	Jakarta	19–20 October	Prime Minister Anwar Ibrahim attended Prabowo Subianto inauguration as the 8th President of Indonesia.
36	China	Shanghai & Beijing	4–7 November	The Prime Minister visited Shanghai and Beijing at the invitation of President Xi Jinping of China. The Prime Minister also attended the China International Import Expo while also meeting with Premier Li Qiang, China Investment Corporation, China International Capital Corporation, Huawei and gave a speech at Peking University.
37	Egypt	Cairo	9–12 November	The Prime Minister visited Cairo at the invitation of President Abdel Fattah el-Sisi of Egypt. Anwar also met with Ahmed el-Tayeb of Al-Azhar al-Sharif and Ali Gomaa, the 18th Dar al-Ifta al-Misriyyah.
37	Saudi Arabia	Riyadh	11 November	Prime Minister Anwar Ibrahim arrived in Riyadh at the invitation of the Custodian of the Two Holy Mosques, King Salman bin Abdulaziz Al Saud for the Extraordinary Arab and Islamic Summit on the escalating violence by the Zionist regime on Palestinians and Lebanese. The Prime Minister also met with Prime Minister Najib Mikati of Lebanon, Crown Prince Sabah Al-Khalid Al-Sabah of Kuwait and Crown Prince Mohammed bin Salman of Saudi Arabia.
37	Peru	Lima	12–16 November	The Prime Minister arrived in Riyadh at the invitation of the President of Peru, Dina Boluarte at the Palacio de Gobierno. The Prime Minister also received Peru's highest honour, the Orden El Sol del Perú. He also met with Shou Zi Chew of TikTok. He then attended the APEC Peru 2024. In between the plenary sessions, Prime Minister Anwar also met with Prime Minister Shigeru Ishiba of Japan, chief executive John Lee Ka-chiu of Hong Kong, Sultan Hassanal Bolkiah of Brunei and Prime Minister Christopher Luxon of New Zealand.
37	Brazil	Rio de Janeiro	16–19 November	The Prime Minister arrived in Rio de Janeiro at the invitation of President Luiz Inácio Lula da Silva of Brazil to attend 2024 G20 Rio de Janeiro summit. During the summit, Prime Minister Anwar also met with President Emmanuel Macron of France to discuss the Israeli–Palestinian conflict.
38	South Korea	Seoul	24–26 November	The Prime Minister arrived in Seoul at the invitation of the President of South Korea, Yoon Suk Yeol to commemorate the 65th anniversary of Malaysia–South Korea relations. The Prime Minister also met with industry leaders such as Samsung Group, SK Group, POSCO and Lotte Corporation before giving a speech at Seoul National University.

== 2025 ==
#	Country	Areas visited	Dates	Details
39	United Arab Emirates	Abu Dhabi	12–14 January	The Prime Minister arrived in Abu Dhabi at the invitation of Sheikh Mohamed bin Zayed Al Nahyan of the United Arab Emirates. He started the official visit by meeting with all three UAE's sovereign wealth funds namely Abu Dhabi Investment Authority, Mubadala Investment Company and Abu Dhabi Future Energy Company. He then met with the Vice President of the United Arab Emirates, Sheikh Mohammed bin Rashid Al Maktoum before signing several MOUs with the Ministry of Investment. He attended a bilateral meeting with Sheikh Mohamed bin Zayed Al Nahyan before attending Abu Dhabi Sustainability Week 2025. He then guided Malaysia's first ever Free Trade Area agreement with a Gulf nation via the Comprehensive Economic Partnership Agreement. During the visit, the Prime Minister also met with the President of Uganda, Yoweri Museveni and the President of Kenya, William Ruto.
39	United Kingdom	London	15–19 January	The Prime Minister arrived in London to kick start his European leg of official visits at the invitation of Prime Minister Sir Keir Starmer. In London, the Prime Minister also met with the Speaker of the House of Commons, Lindsay Hoyle before giving a lecture at London School of Economics. He took the opportunity to attend Friday prayer at East London Mosque as well as meeting with Jeremy Corbyn.
39	Belgium	Brussels	20–21 January	The Prime Minister arrived in Brussels at the invitation of Prime Minister Alexander De Croo of Belgium. He also met with António Costa, the President of the European Council and Kaja Kallas, High Representative of the Union for Foreign Affairs and Security Policy.
39	Switzerland	Davos	22–24 January	The Prime Minister arrived in Davos to attend the World Economic Forum annual summit. On the sidelines of the World Economic Forum (WEF), he met with leaders of multinational companies such as AstraZeneca, Fortescue, DP World, Nestle, Medtronic, Google and TotalEnergies. During the visit, the Prime Minister also met with the Prime Minister of Libya, Abdul Hamid Dbeibeh, the Prime Minister of the Netherlands, Dick Schoof and the President of Somalia, Hassan Sheikh Mohamud.
40	Bahrain	Manama	18–20 February	The Prime Minister arrived in Manama at the invitation of the Prime Minister of Bahrain, Salman bin Hamad bin Isa Al Khalifa. He started the official visit by meeting the Prime Minister of Bahrain at Al-Qudaibiya Palace before giving a lecture at the inaugural Intra-Islamic Dialogue Conference. He then met with Hamad bin Isa Al Khalifa, the King of Bahrain and Salman bin Khalifa Al Khalifa, Ministry of Finance & National Economy. Before ending his official visit, Anwar also met with Ahmed el-Tayeb of Al-Azhar al-Sharif.
41	Vietnam	Hanoi	25–26 February	The Prime Minister travelled to Hanoi to attend the ASEAN Future Forum 2025. Upon arriving in Hanoi, he met with Tô Lâm, the General Secretary of the Communist Party of Vietnam. Afterwards, he met with the Prime Minister of Vietnam, Phạm Minh Chính and the President of Vietnam, Lương Cường.
42	Thailand	Bangkok	17–18 April	The Prime Minister arrived in Bangkok at the invitation of the Prime Minister of Thailand, Paetongtarn Shinawatra. Apart from attending bilateral meeting, the Prime Minister also met with Thailand's leading conglomerates, TCC Group, Minor International and PTT Public Company Limited. Virtually, he met with Chairman of the State Administration Council, Senior General Min Aung Hlaing and Mahn Winn Khaing Thann, the Prime Minister of the National Unity Government of Myanmar.
43	Russia	Moscow & Kazan	13–16 May	
44	Singapore	Central Area	31 May	Special Address at the 22nd Shangri-La Dialogue.
45	Indonesia	Jakarta	27 June	
46	Italy	Rome	1–3 July	
46	France	Paris	3–4 July	
46	Brazil	Rio de Janeiro	5–7 July	
47	Indonesia	Jakarta	28–29 July	
48	China	Shanghai & Tianjin	31 August – 3 September	
49	Qatar	Doha	15 September	
50	Timor-Leste	Dili	23–24 September	
51	South Korea	Gyeongju	30 October – 1 November	
52	Ethiopia	Addis Ababa	18–20 November	
52	South Africa	Johannesburg	20–23 November	
52	Kenya	Nairobi	23–24 November	
53	Singapore	Central Area	4 December	

== 2026 ==
#	Country	Areas visited	Dates	Details
54	Turkey	Ankara & Istanbul	6–8 January	
55	Indonesia	Jakarta	27 March	
56	Philippines	Lapu-Lapu City	7–8 May	Attended the 48th ASEAN Summit and the BIMP-EAGA Special Summit.
57	Japan	Tokyo	8–10 June	
58	Uzbekistan	Tashkent	16 June	
58	Russia	Kazan	17–18 June	
58	Turkmenistan	Ashgabat	18–19 June	
59	Brunei	Bandar Seri Begawan	21–22 August	
60	India	New Delhi & Kerala	11–13 September	
60	Maldives	Malé	14–15 September	
61	China	Shanghai & Hangzhou	22–24 September	
62	Philippines	Manila & Pasay	14–16 November	Attended the 49th ASEAN Summit. Returned to Malaysia briefly on 16 November to attend to French president Emmanuel Macron during his state visit.
63	Philippines	Pasay & Parañaque	17 November	Following Macron's state visit to Malaysia, Anwar returned to the Philippines to attend the closing summits of the 49th ASEAN Summit and the 21st East Asia Summit.
63	China	Shenzhen	18–20 November	

== Multilateral meetings ==
Group	Year			
Group	2023	2024	2025	2026
APEC	15–17 November, (United States) San Francisco	15–16 November, (Peru) Cusco	31 October – 1 November, (South Korea) Gyeongju	18–19 November, (China) Shenzhen
ASEAN (EAS)	9–11 May, (Indonesia) Labuan Bajo	8–11 October, (Laos) Vientiane	26–27 May, (Malaysia) Kuala Lumpur	6–8 May, (Philippines) Lapu-Lapu City
ASEAN (EAS)	5–7 September, (Indonesia) Jakarta	8–11 October, (Laos) Vientiane	26–27 May, (Malaysia) Kuala Lumpur	15–17 November, (Philippines) Pasay
Others	ASEAN–GCC Summit; 20 October, (Saudi Arabia) Riyadh	ASEAN–Australia Special Summit; 3–6 March, Melbourne		ASEAN-Russia Summit; 17–18 June, Kazan
Others	ASEAN–Japan Friendship and Cooperation Commemorative Summit; 16–18 December, Tokyo	ASEAN–Australia Special Summit; 3–6 March, Melbourne		
Future event

== See also ==
- Foreign relations of Malaysia
- List of international prime ministerial trips made by Ismail Sabri Yaakob
- List of international prime ministerial trips made by Muhyiddin Yassin
- List of international prime ministerial trips made by Mahathir Mohamad during his second term
