= List of international prime ministerial trips made by Mahathir Mohamad during his second term =

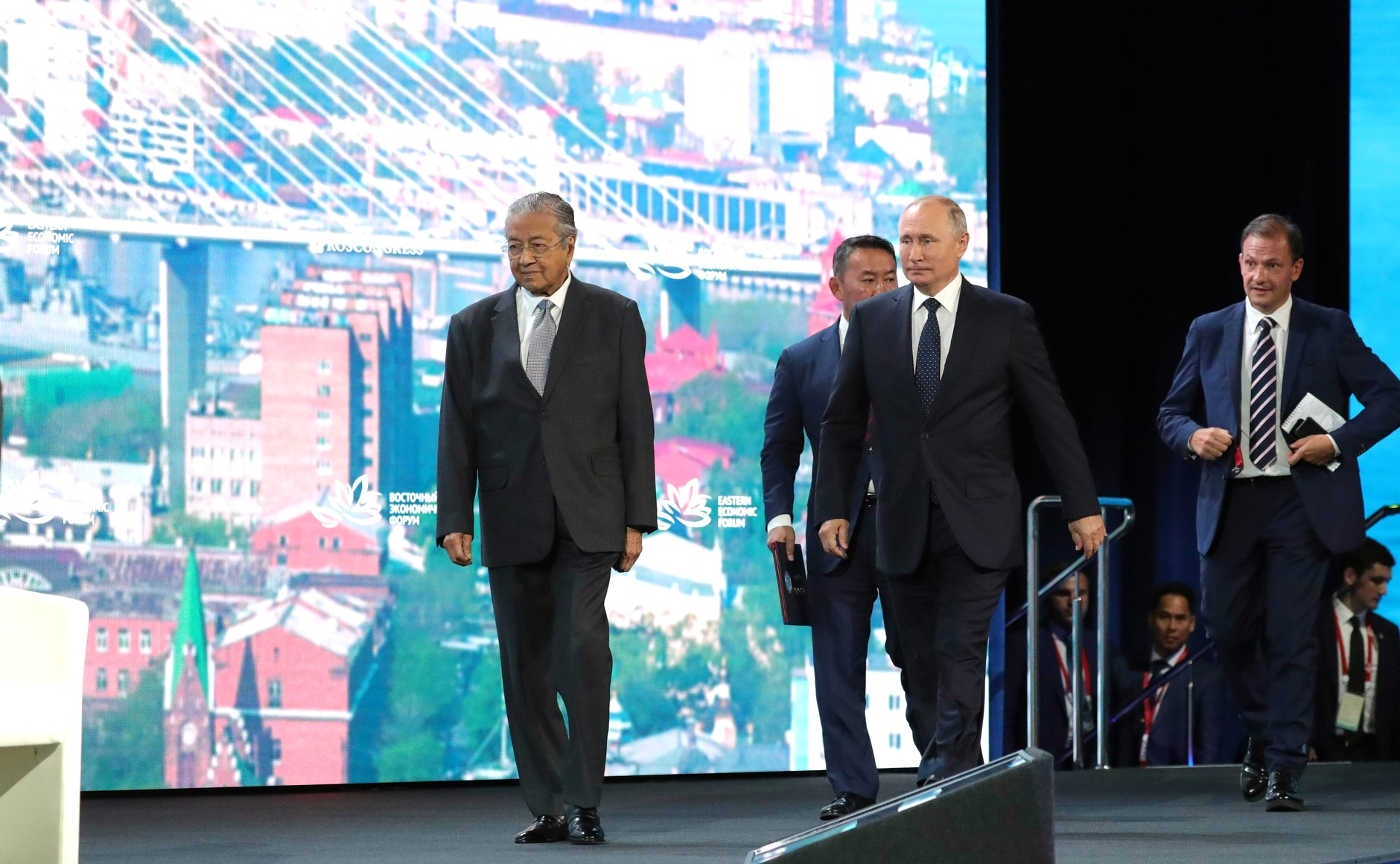
Mahathir joined the 2019 Eastern Economic Forum in Vladivostok, Russia

During Mahathir Mohamad's second term as the Prime Minister of Malaysia, he embarked on a series of official visits to various countries. These visits aimed to strengthen diplomatic ties, promote economic cooperation, and engage in discussions on global and regional issues. He did not make any international trips in 2020. Some of the notable official visits made by Mahathir during his second term include:

== Summary ==
World map highlighting countries visited by Mahathir Mohamad during his second premiership. 1 visit 2 visits 3 visits 4 visits 6 visits Malaysia

The number of visits per country where Prime Minister Mahathir Mohamad travelled are:

- One: Brunei, Papua New Guinea, Senegal, Austria, Philippines, Pakistan, Turkey, Vietnam, Cambodia, Russia, Azerbaijan, Turkmenistan, Qatar, Korea
- Two: China, United States, Singapore
- Three: Indonesia
- Four: Thailand, United Kingdom
- Six: Japan

== 2018 ==
| | Country | Areas visited | Dates | Details | Image |
|---|---|---|---|---|---|
| 1 | Japan | Tokyo | 10–12 June | See also: Japan–Malaysia relations Mahathir attend the Nikkei 24th International Conference on the Future of Asia. He paid a courtesy call on Japanese prime minister Shinzo Abe at his office. Mahathir received a unique present from Shinzo Abe. | |
| 2 | Indonesia | Jakarta | 28–29 June | See also: Indonesia–Malaysia relations Mahathir arrived Jakarta for a two-day official visit to Indonesia. He and Indonesian president Joko Widodo exploring issues ranging from education for Indonesian children in Malaysia to border negotiations. | |
| 3 | Japan | Fukuoka, Oita | 7–9 August | Mahathir delivered the keynote address at a seminar for future Japanese leaders and visited a training center at JR Kyushu, a railway company that operated the high-speed bullet train. He has received an honorary doctorate from the Ritsumeikan Asia Pacific University. As part of Mahathir's long-term vision for Look East, the governments of Malaysia and Japan are currently in discussions regarding the establishment of a Japanese university campus in Malaysia. | |
| 4 | China | Hangzhou, Beijing | 17–21 August | See also: China–Malaysia relations Mahathir arrived Hangzhou to begin his five-day official visit to China. He met with Chinese premier Li Keqiang and President Xi Jinping. | |
| 5 | Brunei | Bandar Seri Begawan | 2–3 September | See also: Brunei–Malaysia relations Mahathir has arrived Bandar Seri Begawan for a two-day working visit. He met with His Majesty Sultan Haji Hassanal Bolkiah Mu'izzaddin Waddaulah, the Sultan and Yang Di-Pertuan of Brunei Darussalam for talks at Istana Nurul Iman. | |
| 6 | United Kingdom | London | 22–25 September | See also: Malaysia–United Kingdom relations Mahathir included meetings with captains of industry, key investors, international capital market analysts, and potential new investors based in the United Kingdom (UK) and European Union (EU). At the Imperial College London, he met with James Dyson. Mahathir delivered a keynote address entitled "The Challenge of Good Governance in the Muslim World" at the Oxford Centre for Islamic Studies. | |
| 7 | United States | New York | 25–29 September | See also: Malaysia–United States relations Mahathir delivered Malaysia's national statement at the 73rd session of the United Nations General Assembly. He met with British prime minister Theresa May and Iranian president Hassan Rouhani. | |
| 8 | United Kingdom | London | 30 September – 1 October | Mahathir participated in a programme with Lotus Cars, met Malaysians for high-tea, and attended a briefing on debt and equity. The next day, he was deliver a talk titled "Future Democracy in Asia" at Chatham House and attended a briefing session on police and public sector reforms in the UK. | |
| 9 | Indonesia | Bali | 11 October | | |
| 10 | Thailand | Bangkok | 24–25 October | See also: Malaysia–Thailand relations Mahathir make an official visit to Thailand to push forward bilateral ties and the peace process in Southern Thailand that Malaysia has facilitated. After meeting Thai prime minister Prayut Chan-o-cha, Malaysia and Thailand have agreed to expand the scope of bilateral cooperation to contain an insurgency along their shared border after changing peace negotiators. | |
| 11 | Japan | Tokyo | 5–7 November | Mahathir arrived Tokyo for a packed three-day working visit to Japan, his third trip to the country. He was conferred "The Grand Cordon of the Order of the Paulownia Flowers" by the emperor of Japan. | |
| 12 | Singapore | Singapore | 12–13 November | See also: Malaysia–Singapore relations Mahathir was accorded official welcome by Singaporean prime minister Lee Hsien Loong upon his arrival. The two leaders spoke of the strong ties between their two countries. Mahathir joined nine other heads of government for the 33rd ASEAN Summit. He met with Russian President Vladimir Putin for a bilateral talk on the sidelines of the Summit, where they also discussed the trade situation and the Syrian civil war. Singaporean president Halimah Yacob, as the chancellor of the National University of Singapore (NUS), conferred upon him the Honorary Doctor of Laws at a ceremony held in recognition of his outstanding leadership of Malaysia and his enduring contributions to the longstanding bilateral relations between Singapore and Malaysia. The university was his alma mater. Mahathir and his wife Siti Hasmah Mohamad Ali also attended an orchid naming ceremony on the Istana grounds. The orchid, named "Dendrobium Mahathir Siti Hasmah", is a cross between Dendrobium Kiyoshu Blue and Dendrobium Pink Lips. | |
| 13 | Papua New Guinea | Port Moresby | 17–18 November | Mahathir led the Malaysian delegation to the 26th APEC Economic Leaders' Meeting (AELM). He met with Canadian prime minister Justin Trudeau and Hong Kong chief executive Carrie Lam. Lam expressed her love for Penang. | |
| 14 | Thailand | Bangkok | 15–16 December | Mahathir arrived in Bangkok for a two-day working visit to Thailand, on a second visit to the country in less than three months. He received an honorary doctorate degree in Rangsit University. | |

== 2019 ==
| | Country | Areas visited | Dates | Details | Image |
|---|---|---|---|---|---|
| 1 | Senegal | Dakar | 16–17 January | See also: Malaysia–Senegal relations Mahathir has the distinction of being the only Asian head of government taking part in the Third International Conference on the Emergence of Africa (ICEA-III). He held talks with Senegal's president Macky Sall after his arrival Dakar. | |
| 2 | United Kingdom | Oxford | 17–20 January | Mahathir arrived in London from Senegal. He was the first Malaysian and democratically-elected ASEAN leader to have been invited to speak at the Oxford Union. | |
| 3 | Austria | Vienna | 20–22 January | See also: Austria–Malaysia relations Mahathir attended the 10th Annual General Conference and General Meeting of Anti-Corruption Authorities (IAACA) and delivered a lecture at the International Anti-Corruption Academy (IACA). He met with Austrian chancellor Sebastian Kurz and discussed economic relations and vowed to further increase their cooperation. Later, Mahathir also met Austrian president Alexander Van der Bellen at the Hofburg Palace. Mahathir welcomes more foreign direct investment from Austria. | |
| 4 | Philippines | Manila | 6–7 March | See also: Malaysia–Philippines relations Mahathir received a state welcome at Malacanang Palace. It was the first such reception given to a foreign head of government by the Philippines under the administration of President Rodrigo Duterte. The Mahathir-Duterte summit highlighted some of the ongoing activities in the bilateral relationship, which both sides continue to work on as they navigate their broader domestic and foreign policies. He warned the Philippines against allowing foreigners who could "disrupt the political balance" as Duterte's pivot toward Beijing led to an influx of Chinese workers. On the last day of his visit to Manila, Mahathir met with Moro Islamic Liberation Front rebel chairman Murad Ebrahim. | |
| 5 | Pakistan | Islamabad | 21–23 March | See also: Malaysia–Pakistan relations Mahathir arrived Islamabad for a three-day official visit to Pakistan. A senior Pakistani official has stated that Pakistan is set to sign telecoms and information technology deals worth US$900 million during a three-day visit by Mahathir. | |
| 6 | China | Beijing | 24–28 April | Mahathir arrived in China to join some 36 world leaders and participants from 130 countries at the Belt and Road Forum for International Cooperation (BRF) at the invitation of Chinese President Xi Jinping. He said Malaysia has expressed full support for China's Belt and Road development strategy. Mahathir met with Xi Jinping and Premier Li Keqiang. He and Li witnessed the signing of three significant memoranda of understanding. They were on enhancing palm oil trade and cooperation; collaborating in the development of industrial parks, infrastructure, logistics hub, and transit-oriented developments pursuant to the East Coast Rail Link (ECRL) project; and on the reinstatement of Bandar Malaysia. Mahathir attended a dinner in his honor hosted by Li Zhanshu at the Great Hall of the People. He also visited China's multinational telecommunications company Huawei Technologies Co Ltd and the provider of artificial intelligence technology, Sensetime. | |
| 7 | Japan | Tokyo | 29–31 May | Mahathir delivered a keynote address to the 25th International Conference on the Future of Asia or the Nikkei Conference. On the last day of the visit, he held a bilateral meeting with Japanese prime minister Shinzo Abe at the Prime Minister's Office. | |
| 8 | United Kingdom | Cambridge | 15–17 June | Mahathir was the first "Malaysian and democratically-elected leader" from ASEAN to have spoken at the Cambridge Union. | |
| 9 | Thailand | Bangkok | 20–23 June | Mahathir led the Malaysian delegation to the 34th ASEAN Summit. He also attended the 13th Brunei Darussalam-Indonesia-Malaysia-Philippines East ASEAN Growth Area (BIMP-EAGA) Summit and the 12th Indonesia-Malaysia-Thailand Growth Triangle (IMT-GT) Summit. Mahathir launched the inaugural Malaysia Fest 2019 in Bangkok, the festival showcased Malaysia's rich heritage through cultural performances, food, handicrafts, and fashion. | |
| 10 | Turkey | Ankara | 24–27 July | See also: Malaysia–Turkey relations Mahathir made a four-day official visit to Turkey to strengthen bilateral ties. Recep Tayyip Erdoğan, the President of Turkey, was present to welcome Mahathir as he arrived at the Esenboga International Airport. He visited Anıtkabir, the mausoleum of modern Turkey founding father Mustafa Kemal Atatürk. Mahathir then visited Turkish Aerospace Industries. He was awarded with the Turkish Order of the Republic, making him the first Southeast Asia leader to receive the honour. Mahathir was also conferred with an Honorary Doctorate of Political Sciences and Public Administration by the Ankara Yıldırım Beyazıt University. | |
| 11 | Japan | Fukuoka | 6–8 August | Mahathir received a courtesy call from Hiroto Izumi, the special adviser to the prime minister of Japan, to discuss bilateral ties between Malaysia and Japan. He had delivered annual lectures on leadership at the Japan Future Leaders School and the Kyushu-Asia Institute of Leadership. Mahathir was conferred an honorary doctorate by the International University of Japan (IUJ) in recognition of his outstanding contributions to Malaysia-Japan relationships. | |
| 12 | Singapore | Singapore | 9 August | Mahathir was in Singapore to attend its Bicentennial National Day Parade. He and his wife, Siti Hasmah Mohamad Ali, arrived in a special aircraft at Changi Airport and were received at the VIP complex by Singapore's Foreign Affairs Minister, Vivian Balakrishnan. Former Prime Minister of Singapore, Goh Chok Tong, used the word 'amazing' three times to describe Mahathir. | |
| 13 | Vietnam | Hanoi | 26–28 August | See also: Malaysia–Vietnam relations Mahathir arrived in Hanoi for his inaugural official visit to Vietnam. He met with President of Vietnam, Nguyễn Phú Trọng. He visited an exhibition of Vietnamese cars, particularly the VinFast models Lu SA 2.0, Lux SA (A) 2.0, and Fadil 1.5, and test-drove one of the models. Mahathir then visited the Noi Bai Industrial Zone (NBIZ) for which he had participated in the groundbreaking ceremony in 1996 during a visit to Vietnam. | |
| 14 | Cambodia | Phnom Penh | 2–4 September | See also: Cambodia–Malaysia relations Mahathir arrived in Phnom Penh for a three-day official visit to Cambodia. He received a red carpet welcome at Cambodia's Peace Palace. Mahathir attended the "Balancing Relations with the Superpowers in the Context of ASEAN" dialogue session with approximately 1,000 students and invited guests at Cambodia's oldest public university, the Royal University of Phnom Penh (RUPP). He was honored with the Muslim Exemplary Leadership award by the Cambodian Muslim Community in recognition of Malaysia's role in assisting the Muslims in the country. Later, Mahathir and Siti Hasmah Mohamad Ali attended a dinner with the Malaysian diaspora. Mahathir paid a courtesy call to the acting head of state and president of Cambodia, Samdech Vibol Sena Pheakdey Say Chhum. | |
| 15 | Russia | Vladivostok | 4–5 September | See also: Malaysia–Russia relations Mahathir has landed Vladivostok to take part in the 5th Eastern Economic Forum. He met with Russian President Vladimir Putin and Indian Prime Minister Narendra Modi. | |
| 16 | Japan | Osaka, Kyoto | 5–7 September | Mahathir was conferred the honorary degree of Doctor of Humane Letters by Doshisha University, with its president Takashi Matsuoka conducting a special conferment ceremony at the university. He was the 68th recipient of the award in the university's 144-year history. Mahathir dropped by the offices of two Japanese companies with operations in Malaysia, namely Towa Chiki Corporation and Shimadzu Corporation. The next day, he visited the Ritsumeikan Elementary School, the only school in Japan that incorporated a traditional approach and modern technology in its teaching. Ending his visit, Mahathir attended a dinner with about 200 Malaysian students and expatriates from Osaka and Kyoto. | |
| 17 | United States | New York | 24–28 September | Mahathir delivered Malaysia's national statement at the 74th session of the United Nations General Assembly. He met with Netherlands Prime Minister Mark Rutte and Pakistan Prime Minister Imran Khan. He also spoke at the event titled "Environmental Stewardship in Addressing Poverty to Achieve Sustainable Development for All." Another highlight of Mahathir's itinerary was his participation in Leaders Dialogue 6 on 'The 2020 - 2030 Vision' in conjunction with the Sustainable Development Goals Summit. He attended the World Leaders Forum at Columbia University. | |
| 18 | United Kingdom | London | 29–30 September | Mahathir arrived in London from New York for a two-day working visit. He visited the Battersea Power Station project, one of the biggest Malaysian investments in the United Kingdom. Mahathir also visited The British Museum, where he saw the exhibition entitled "How the Islamic World Influenced Western Art" at the Albukhary Foundation Gallery of the Islamic World. | |
| 19 | Indonesia | Jakarta | 20 October | Mahathir attended the inauguration ceremony of the president and vice president of the Republic of Indonesia for the term of 2019 – 2024 at the People's Consultative Assembly (MPR). He shook hands with President Joko Widodo and congratulated him. | |
| 20 | Azerbaijan | Baku | 25–26 October | See also: Azerbaijan–Malaysia relations Mahathir arrived in the Baku to attend the 18th Non-Aligned Movement (NAM) Summit. When Mahathir paid a courtesy visit to Azerbaijan President Ilham Aliyev, Malaysia and Azerbaijan agreed to enhance their bilateral relations, with a particular focus on the energy and tourism sectors. He also met Bangladesh Prime Minister Sheikh Hasina, North Korea president of the Presidium of the Supreme People's Assembly, Choe Ryong-hae, Pakistan President Arif Alvi and Iran President Hassan Rouhani. Mahathir visited Petroliam Nasional Bhd (Petronas) office in Baku. | |
| 21 | Turkmenistan | Ashgabat | 27–28 October | See also: Malaysia–Turkmenistan relations Mahathir arrived in the Ashgabat for a two-day official visit. His visit is at the invitation of President of Turkmenistan Gurbanguly Berdimuhamedov. The talks between the two leaders covered a wide range of bilateral, regional, and international issues of mutual interest. Having confirmed their shared desire to maintain close contacts at a high level and to deepen cooperation in all areas, the two leaders paid special attention to the tasks of cooperation between Turkmenistan and Malaysia in the fields of politics, the economy, trade, energy, technology, logistics, industry, as well as in the cultural and humanitarian spheres. Mahathir said that there were prospects for further cooperation between Malaysia and Turkmenistan in aerospace, the oil and gas industry, and cotton. During the visit, he has praised the contributions of Malaysians in Turkmenistan, most of whom are working in the Central Asian nation's oil and gas industry. | |
| 22 | Thailand | Bangkok | 1–4 November | Mahathir led the Malaysian delegation to the 35th ASEAN Summit and Related Summits in Bangkok. He met with Thai prime minister Prayuth Chan-o-cha, to enhance bilateral relations and discuss progress in various areas of cooperation, especially in the promotion of connectivity, including the road alignment linking CIQ Sadao - ICQS Bukit Kayu Hitam, as well as developments along the Thailand-Malaysia border, border security, and bilateral trade. Mahathir was interviewed by The Sydney Morning Herald. | |
| 23 | Korea | Busan, Seoul | 24–28 November | See also: Malaysia–South Korea relations Mahathir arrived at Busan's Gimhae Air Base to attend the Asean-South Korea Commemorative Summit 2019. He met with South Korean President Moon Jae-in before the summit, and welcomed Korea's "looking south policy". Mahathir also said Malaysia is prepared to reopen its embassy in Pyongyang, North Korea. On the fourth day of his visit to Korea, Mahathir arrived in Seoul and received a warm welcome from the hosts. The official reception took place at the Seoul Air Base, accompanied by the popular song "Standing in the Eyes of the World." He and Moon Jae-in witnessed the signing of four Memorandums of Understanding (MOUs) in information and communications technology, digital government, healthcare and medical science, and water and sewerage management. During his time of the visit, Mahathir visited aerospace, rail and shipping construction facilities. | |
| 24 | Qatar | Doha | 11–14 December | See also: Malaysia–Qatar relations Mahathir was accorded an official welcoming ceremony at Amiri Diwan in conjunction with his four-day official visit to Qatar. He was conferred an honorary doctorate by Qatar University. The Emir of Qatar, Sheikh Tamim bin Hamad Al Thani, praised Malaysia for successfully organizing the Kuala Lumpur Summit 2019 during the four-eyed meeting with Mahathir. On the last day of the visit, Mahathir attended the Doha Forum 2019, where he delivered the keynote address, addressing the re-imagining of governance in a multi-polar world from Malaysia's perspective. At the forum, Mahathir was conferred the Doha Forum Award by the Emir of Qatar, becoming the first recipient of the Doha Forum Award. | |

== See also ==
- Second premiership of Mahathir Mohamad
- Foreign relations of Malaysia
- List of international prime ministerial trips made by Ismail Sabri Yaakob
- List of international prime ministerial trips made by Muhyiddin Yassin
- List of international prime ministerial trips made by Anwar Ibrahim
