= List of international prime ministerial trips made by Ismail Sabri Yaakob =

Ismail Sabri Yaakob, the 9th prime minister of Malaysia, made 11 international trips to 12 nations during his premiership, which began on 21 August 2021 and ended on 24 November 2022.

== Summary ==
The number of visits per country where Prime Minister Ismail Sabri travelled are:

- One: Singapore, Brunei, Cambodia, Thailand, Vietnam, Qatar, United Kingdom, Japan and Turkey
- Two: Indonesia, United States and United Arab Emirates

== 2021 ==
	Country	Areas visited	Dates	Details	Image
1	Indonesia	Jakarta, Bogor, Bandung	9–11 November	Held discussion with the Indonesian business community, the Indonesian media and the Malaysian diaspora. Met with President Joko Widodo at Istana Bogor. Visited the production facility of military equipment, PT Pindad in Bandung.	
2	Singapore	Woodlands, Central Area	29 November	Met with Prime Minister Lee Hsien Loong and President Halimah Yacob. Launched the vaccinated travel lane at the Woodlands Checkpoint for travel between the two nations.	

== 2022 ==
	Country	Areas visited	Dates	Details	Image
1	Brunei	Bandar Seri Begawan	14–15 February	Met with Sultan Hassanal Bolkiah at Istana Nurul Iman. Discussed the proposed establishment of a vaccinated travel lane (VTL) by air between both nations, cooperation in the field of health diplomacy, and proposals towards strengthening economic cooperation. Had an opportunity to hold a meeting session with the Malaysian diaspora.	
2	Cambodia	Phnom Penh	23–24 February	Met with Prime Minister Hun Sen and King Norodom Sihamoni. Discussed initiatives to further strengthen both nations' long-standing relations including post-COVID-19 cooperation. Had an opportunity to hold a meeting session with the Malaysian diaspora.	
2	Thailand	Bangkok	24–26 February	Discussed the proposed reopening of the border, recognition of vaccination cert, cooperation in vaccine R&D, infrastructure projects on the border as well as economic relations and cooperation between the two nations. Had an opportunity to hold a meeting session with the Malaysian diaspora. Attended a hi-tea ceremony with members of the Malaysia-Thailand Chamber of Commerce. Met with Prime Minister Prayut Chan-ocha at Government House.	
3	Vietnam	Hanoi	20–22 March	Had an opportunity to hold a meeting session with the Malaysian diaspora. Met with several Vietnamese leaders including Prime Minister Pham Minh Chinh and President Nguyen Xuan Phuc. Discussed on strengthening cooperation between the two countries post COVID-19. Discussed few current issues including Myanmar, and the impact of the Russian invasion of Ukraine. The two leaders also witnessed several MoU exchanges.	
4	Qatar	Doha, Al Khor	27–29 March	Visited the Baladna farm, Baladna-quality Holstein cow milk production centre, Agrico's organic vegetable, mushroom and shrimp farm in Al Khor. Had an opportunity to hold a meeting session with the Malaysian diaspora. Met with Emir of Qatar Tamim bin Hamad Al Thani at the Amiri Diwan. Exchanged views on international issues of mutual interest, paving the way for economic collaboration as well as post-pandemic recovery efforts.	
4	United Arab Emirates	Dubai	29–31 March	Witnessed the signing of several MOUs at the Emaar Club. Visited the Malaysia Pavilion at the Dubai 2020 Expo. Attended the 2022 World Government Summit and met Prime Minister Mohammed bin Rashid Al Maktoum. Attended a dinner with the Malaysian diaspora.	
5	Indonesia	Jakarta	1 April	Met with President Joko Widodo at Istana Merdeka. Witnessed the signing of an MOU for the recruitment and protection of Indonesian domestic workers in Malaysia.	
6	United Kingdom	Luton, London	10 May	Visited the "Tenun Pahang: Weaving Hope" exhibition in conjunction with London Craft Week at the Malaysian High Commission building, Belgrave Square. Met with Raja Permaisuri Agong Tunku Azizah Aminah Maimunah Iskandariah. Attended Aidilfitri celebration with the Malaysian diaspora.	
6	United States	Maryland, Washington, D.C.	10–13 May	Met with several prominent leaders representing US Fortune 500 companies and senior officials of major US companies. Witnessed several exchanges of MoU documents. Met with President Joe Biden and Vice President Kamala Harris, along with other ASEAN leaders, at the White House for the ASEAN-US Special Summit.	
7	Japan	Tokyo	23–28 May	Received the Honorary Doctorate in Medicine from Nihon University. Visited Itabashi City Hall to witness the signing of a pledge to strengthen sustainable development goals. Had a collaboration session between Malaysian businessmen and their communities in Itabashi. Met with top management representatives from 14 Japanese companies in Itabashi. Delivered his inaugural keynote address at the 27th Nikkei Conference. He met with former Malaysian Prime Minister Mahathir Mohamad in Tokyo, where they had a brief conversation during the 27th Nikkei Future of Asia Forum.	
8	Turkey	Istanbul, Ankara	5–8 July	Visited Istanbul Sabiha Gökçen International Airport, operated by MAHB. Attended a business meeting session involving Malaysian giants and leading Turkish companies. Met with Malaysian diaspora. Visited the defence companies Makine ve Kimya Corporation and Turkish Aerospace Industries in Ankara. Met with President Recep Tayyip Erdogan while exchanging views on strengthening relations between the two countries, as well as discussing economic cooperation and regional and international issues.	
9	United States	New York City	22–25 September	Delivered Malaysia's national statement at the seventy-seventh session of the United Nations General Assembly. Met with President Mahmoud Abbas of Palestine, and Prime Minister Mark Rutte of the Netherlands. Had dinner with the Malaysian diaspora in New York.	
9	United Arab Emirates	Abu Dhabi	26–29 September	Visited the Abu Dhabi National Oil Company (ADNOC) to build cooperation between Malaysia's PETRONAS and United Arab Emirates' ADNOC in the areas of oil, gas and renewable energy. Had an audience with President Mohamed bin Zayed Al Nahyan at the Presidential Palace in Abu Dhabi.	

== Multilateral meetings ==
Group	Year	
Group	2021	2022
APEC	12 November, (New Zealand) Auckland	
EAS (ASEAN)	26–27 October, (Brunei) Bandar Seri Begawan	
Others	None	None
██ = Virtual

== See also ==
- Foreign relations of Malaysia
- List of international prime ministerial trips made by Anwar Ibrahim
- List of international prime ministerial trips made by Muhyiddin Yassin
- List of international prime ministerial trips made by Mahathir Mohamad during his second term
