= Premiership of Mahathir Mohamad =

Premiership of Mahathir Mohamad may refer to:

- First premiership of Mahathir Mohamad (1981–2003)
- Second premiership of Mahathir Mohamad (2018–2020)
