= List of international prime ministerial trips made by Muhyiddin Yassin =

Muhyiddin Yassin, the 8th prime minister of Malaysia, made four international trips to four countries during his premiership, which began on 1 March 2020 and ended on 21 August 2021. Due to the COVID-19 pandemic, he did not make any international trips in 2020.

== Summary ==
The number of visits per country where Prime Minister Muhyiddin travelled are:

- One: Saudi Arabia, United Arab Emirates and Brunei
- Two: Indonesia

== 2021 ==
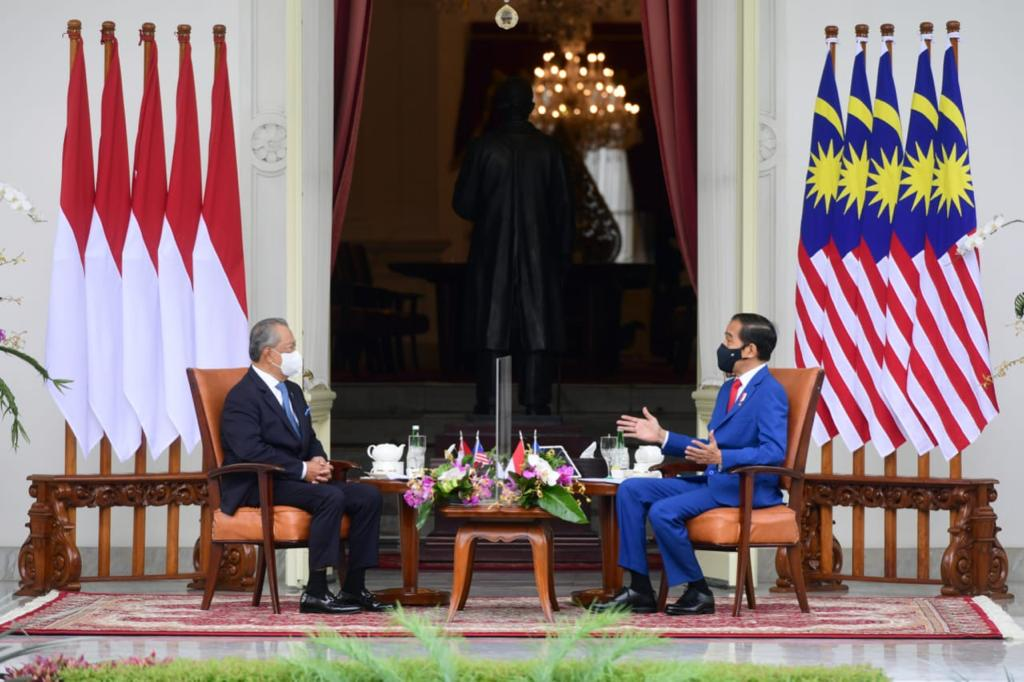
Muhyiddin Yassin during Veranda Talk with Indonesian President Joko Widodo at Istana Merdeka, Jakarta

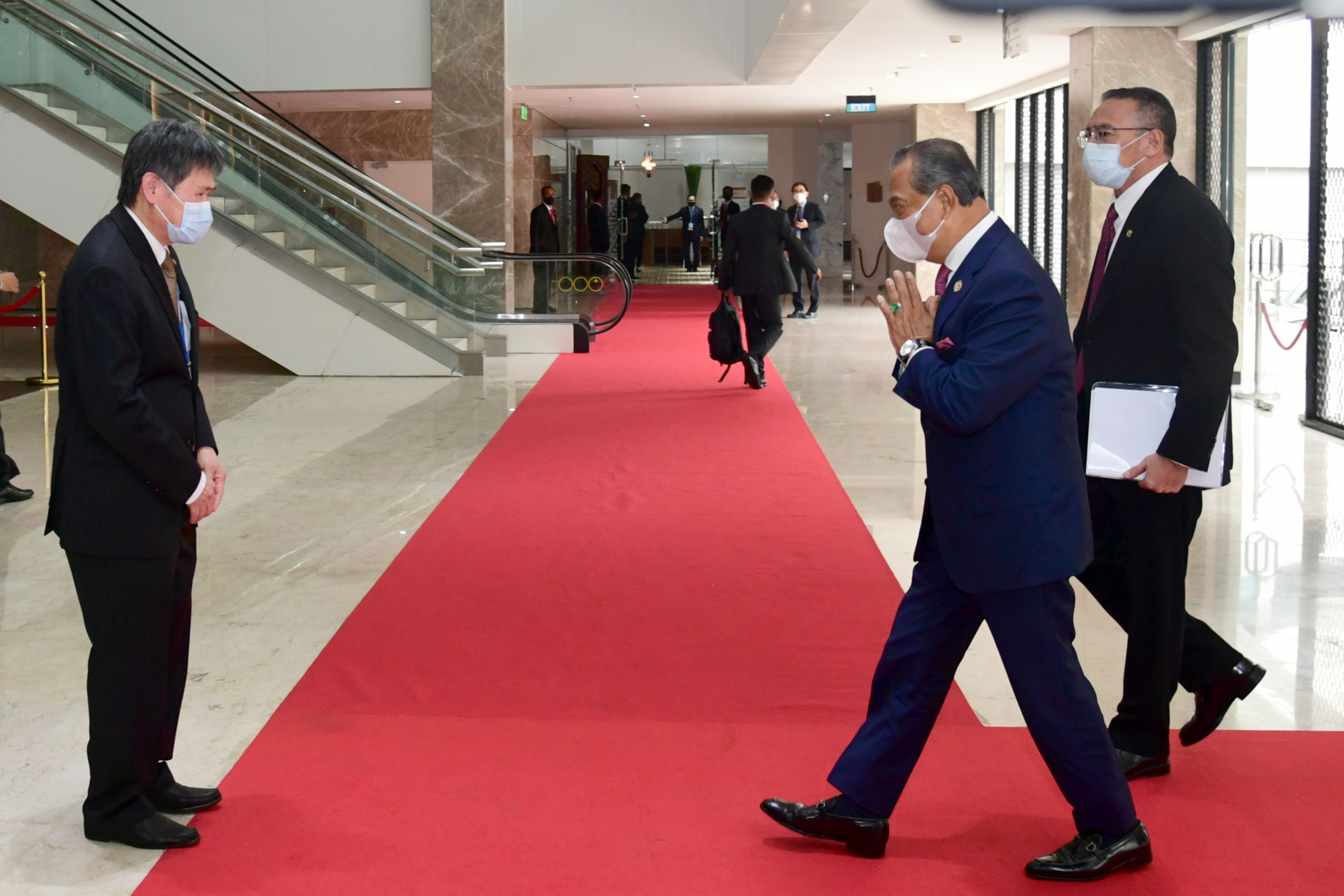
ASEAN Secretary General Lim Jock Hoi greets Muhyiddin Yassin and Foreign Minister Hishammuddin Hussein at the ASEAN summit in Jakarta, 24 April 2021

	Country	Areas visited	Dates	Details
1	Indonesia	Jakarta	4–5 February	Muhyiddin's first inaugural visit. Received a formal welcome from President Joko Widodo at the Merdeka Palace in Jakarta.
2	Saudi Arabia	Mecca, Medina & Riyadh	6–9 March	Muhyiddin performed umrah in Masjid al-Haram, Mecca and was given opportunity to enter the Kaaba. On 7 March, he arrived in Medina to visit Al-Masjid an-Nabawi. On 9 March, he met Crown Prince Mohammed bin Salman in Riyadh. In his meeting, Muhyiddin requested for additional quota for hajj and the Saudi Arabian government agreed to give Malaysia an additional 10,000 haj quota.
2	United Arab Emirates	Abu Dhabi	9–11 March	Met Crown Prince Sheikh Mohammed bin Zayed Al Nahyan and Prime Minister Sheikh Mohammed bin Rashid Al Maktoum.
3	Brunei	Bandar Seri Begawan	4–5 April	Muhyiddin attended 23rd Malaysia-Brunei Darussalam Annual Leaders’ Consultation. Met Sultan Hassanal Bolkiah.
4	Indonesia	Jakarta	24 April	Muhyiddin attended the 2021 ASEAN Summit.

== See also ==
- Foreign relations of Malaysia
- List of international prime ministerial trips made by Ismail Sabri Yaakob
- List of international prime ministerial trips made by Mahathir Mohamad during his second term
