= Premiership of Ismail Sabri Yaakob =

Period of the Government of Malaysia

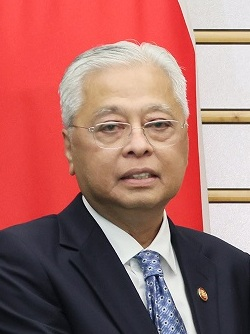
- Premiership of Ismail Sabri Yaakob; 21 August 2021 – 10 October 2022
- Monarch: Al-Sultan Abdullah Ri'ayatuddin Al-Mustafa Billah Shah
- Prime Minister: Ismail Sabri Yaakob
- Cabinet: Ismail Sabri I
- Party: BN–UMNO
- Seat: Seri Perdana

The tenure of Ismail Sabri Yaakob as the prime minister of Malaysia began on 21 August 2021 when he was appointed to the office by Yang di-Pertuan Agong Al-Sultan Abdullah Ri'ayatuddin Al-Mustafa Billah Shah, following the resignation of his predecessor, Muhyiddin Yassin, after a political crisis.

== Leadership bid ==
Ismail Sabri Yaakob, the deputy prime minister, and Anwar Ibrahim, the leader of the opposition, were considered the front-runners for the office of prime minister after the resignation of Muhyiddin Yassin, the 8th prime minister, on 16 August 2021 was caretaker prime minister.

A few days later, Ismail Sabri was chosen as the prime ministerial candidate by Barisan Nasional (BN) coalition and was also endorsed by other coalition parties namely Perikatan Nasional (PN), Gabungan Parti Sarawak (GPS), and Gabungan Rakyat Sabah (GRS) as well as several independent MPs of the Dewan Rakyat.

According to reports, Ismail Sabri Yaakob obtained 114 supports from MPs of various parties, which means he has more support than 111 MPs required to win a simple majority. Meanwhile, Anwar Ibrahim is said to have only won the support of 92 MPs.

== First 100 days ==
Ismail Sabri Yaakob announced that the achievement of his administration during the first 100 days as prime minister was 90% based on the KPIs set by him to reflect the performance of him and his cabinet ministers in the first 100 days. The achievement is translated into the Program 100 Hari Aspirasi Keluarga Malaysia which started on 9 December until 12 December 2021 for four days which allows the people to see all the achievements of the government led by Ismail Sabri during that period.

However, there are some parties who question and dispute the performance and success of the first 100 days of the government led by Ismail Sabri, including from the opposition parties.

== Cabinet ==
On 25 August 2021, Ismail Sabri Yaakob sought an audience with the Yang di-Pertuan Agong at Istana Negara on 25 August 2021 to submit his cabinet lineup list for consent and subsequently announce it. However, the audience was delayed to the following day on 26 August 2021 as the Yang di-Pertuan Agong was in Kuantan. He then announced his cabinet lineup in the morning on 27 August 2021, a day after his audience with Yang di-Pertuan Agong and said all his Cabinet ministers were given 100 days to prove themselves as capable ministers. The Prime Minister's Office (PMO) stated that the new cabinet would take their oaths of offices and officially be sworn in at the Istana Negara in the afternoon on 30 August 2021, a day before the 64th National Day of Malaysia, this was said to avoid an unprecedented situation which there is no cabinet during the National Day.

On 25 August 2021, the Prime Minister-elect, Ismail Sabri Yaakob, will meet with the Yang di-Pertuan Agong to submit his list of cabinet nominees. However, the meeting is delayed until the following day. Ismail Sabri Yaakob then announces his cabinet lineup on 27 August 2021, 100 days before they are officially sworn in. The PMO states that the new cabinet will take their oaths of office on 30 August 2021, the day before Malaysia's National Day.

The new cabinet lineup is highly similar to the cabinet under Ismail's predecessor Muhyiddin Yassin, the Muhyiddin cabinet which only four of the ministers in the Muhyiddin cabinet were not reappointed. The number of ministers and deputy ministers is also same as Muhyiddin cabinet and there was only a minor reshuffle between both cabinets, which only a small number of ministers and deputy ministers reappointed to different portfolios as their previous ones. In addition, there is also no deputy prime minister appointed and four senior ministers were appointed instead to cover the duties of a deputy prime minister, he also followed Muhyiddin on this arrangement before he was promoted to deputy prime minister on 7 July 2021. Following this, the new cabinet lineup was criticised by the opposition politicians. According to parliamentary opposition leader Anwar Ibrahim and DAP leader Lim Guan Eng, most people were disappointed by the new cabinet lineup because new faces were expected in the cabinet to find new solutions to the current COVID-19 pandemic and economic recession. On 30 August 2021, the new Cabinet was sworn-in in a ceremony at the Istana Negara without his presence, the first in history without the presence of the prime minister. He added that Special Committee on Pandemic Management to rope in all stakeholders, including the Opposition, for national recovery and 10 million Malaysians would receive financial aid payments in the COVID-19 Special Aid (BKC) from 6 September 2021 and hoped that the payments would ease the burden of the people.

On 30 September 2021, Ismail Sabri Yaakob called on his cabinet ministers to present report cards to the public on their performance as Cabinet ministers in their first 100 days in offices for them to be evaluated to ensure they are providing the top service to the people. On 1 October 2021, he added that the government will enhance support systems for senior citizens to ensure that the needs of this group are well taken of.

On 4 September 2021, Ismail Sabri Yaakob made a controversial appointment of Muhyiddin Yassin as Chairman of the National Recovery Council (NRC), a Cabinet minister-level position which is described as powerful and influential when Malaysia is still struggling to recover from the COVID-19 pandemic, some have criticised this appointment as Muhyiddin Yassin failed to contain COVID-19 pandemic and spearhead the recovery efforts during his 17-month term as prime minister from 1 March 2020 until 16 August 2021, Ismail Sabri Yaakob defended that the appointment is based on the experiences of Muhyiddin in containing the COVID-19 pandemic. On 10 September 2021, he claimed that the Cabinet was committed to undertake several parliament reforms and transformations, including tabling anti-party hopping law.

== Keluarga Malaysia ==
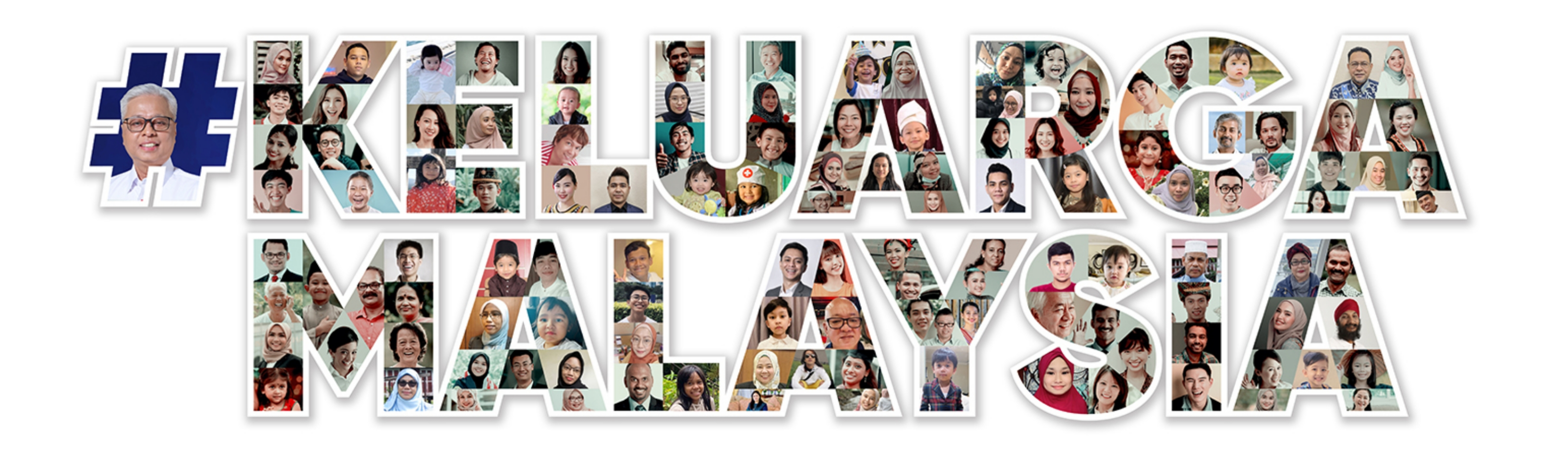
The official logo of the Keluarga Malaysia

The Keluarga Malaysia (in English: Malaysian family) is an idea introduced by the Ismail Sabri on 22 August 2021 in his inaugural speech as prime minister. It was officially launched on 23 October 2021 in Kuching, Sarawak. This concept, among others, calls on Malaysians to set aside differences in rehabilitating the country to mobilize energy in the challenge of facing the COVID-19 pandemic and realizing the Shared Prosperity Vision 2030.

Malaysian premierships
Preceded by Muhyiddin Yassin	Ismail Sabri premiership 2021–2022	Succeeded by Anwar Ibrahim
