= Second premiership of Mahathir Mohamad =

Government of Malaysia from 2018 to 2020

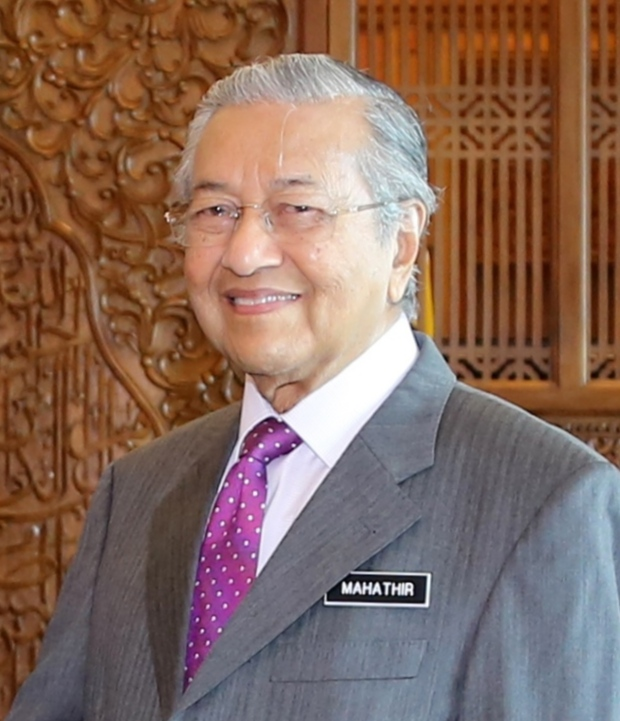
- Mahathir in 2018
- Second premiership of Mahathir Mohamad; 10 May 2018 – 24 February 2020
- Monarchs: Abdullah; Muhammad V
- Prime Minister: Mahathir Mohamad
- Cabinet: Mahathir VII
- Party: PH–BERSATU
- Election: 2018
- Seat: Seri Perdana

Mahathir Mohamad's second term as the Prime Minister of Malaysia, which lasted from 2018 to 2020, was marked by several significant developments and events. Having previously led the country from 1981 to 2003, Mahathir came out of retirement in response to the 1MDB scandal. He led the opposition Pakatan Harapan coalition to victory in the 2018 general election, defeating Barisan Nasional and prime minister Najib Razak.

His government initiated reforms, addressed corruption, and aimed to strengthen the country's economy. One major focus was on the 1MDB scandal investigation. Mahathir also worked on improving relations with neighboring countries and embarked on numerous international trips. Additionally, his administration focused on addressing environmental issues and promoting sustainable development. He resigned in February 2020 amid a political crisis.

== 2018 general election ==
In the May 2018 general elections, Mahathir's coalition, Pakatan Harapan, achieved a historic victory by defeating the long-ruling Barisan Nasional coalition that had been in power for over 60 years. At the age of 92, Mahathir became the world's oldest serving prime minister. Voters, fueled by anger over the multi-billion dollar scandal at 1Malaysia Development Berhad (1MDB) and rising living costs, dumped Najib Razak and his long-ruling coalition in a general election. Najib said that he accepted the will of the people. At 10 pm, Mahathir was officially sworn in as prime minister.

During his first press conference on that historic night, Mahathir was asked whether any action would be taken against Najib Razak, the leader of BN. He replied, "We, Pakatan Harapan, are not seeking revenge. We simply want to restore the rule of law." He announced government plans to scrap the highly disputed goods and service tax introduced in 2015 and a recent "fake news" law.

In May 2018, Mahathir says his first 20 years in office were “fairly easy” compared to what is confronting him now — massive debt in a country with an international reputation for corruption

On 15 May 2018, Mahathir said he may remain premier for up to two years and will play a role in the background even after he steps down.

== Cabinet ==
On 12 May 2018, Mahathir named former Penang Chief Minister Lim Guan Eng as Malaysia's new finance minister. He also named former deputy prime minister Muhyiddin Yassin as the home or interior minister and Mohamad Sabu, the President of the National Trust Party (AMANAH), as the defence minister. He has also appointed a 'council of elders' comprising former finance minister Daim Zainuddin, former Bank Negara governor Zeti Akhtar Aziz, former Petronas president Hassan Marican, tycoon Robert Kuok, and economist Jomo Kwame Sundaram who will serve as advisors to the government.

On 18 May 2018, Mahathir has unveiled a 14- member Cabinet following approval by the Yang di-Pertuan Agong Sultan Muhammad V.

On 23 May 2018, Mahathir chaired the first cabinet meeting in Perdana Putra. Mahathir said all Cabinet ministers would be taking a 10 per cent pay cut from their basic salary with immediate effect.

On 2 July 2018, thirteen ministers and twenty-three deputy ministers were sworn in before the Yang Di-Pertuan Agong, Sultan Muhammad V.

Mahathir arrives in Johor to meet with Sultan Ibrahim (January 2019)

On 10 January 2020, the Prime Minister's Department said the cabinet decided that Mahathir will serve as the acting education minister.

== 1MDB scandal ==
Mahathir moved swiftly against his predecessor, Najib Razak, just days after his shocking election victory. He banned Najib from leaving the country and planned to reopen an investigation into the 1MDB scandal that Najib had helped set up. After than, police cordon off home of Najib.

On 21 May 2018, Mahathir has agreed to form a special investigation team to thoroughly probe into the 1MDB case.

On 19 June 2018, Mahathir said embezzlement and bribery involving government funds are among the charges that Malaysia is considering bringing against Najib. He also say his government had a near perfect case against predecessor Najib over the alleged theft of state money. On 3 July, Najib has been arrested in Kuala Lumpur. He charged with multiple counts of corruption, money laundering, and abuse of power related to the 1MDB scandal.

On 13 November 2018, Mahathir told CNBC than Goldman Sachs Group Inc “cheated” Malaysia over its dealings with 1MDB. He said that US prosecutors have promised to help return money that Goldman Sachs charged for its dealings with 1MDB.

On 9 April 2019, Mahathir and Singaporean Prime Minister Lee Hsien Loong jointly praised their countries’ collaboration in investigating the 1MDB scandal. The two leaders acknowledged the cooperation that was also extended to the United States and Switzerland.

On 3 May 2019, Mahathir expressed confidence that US and Singaporean authorities will proceed to return more than RM930 million allegedly misappropriated from 1MDB.

== Review of Mega Projects ==
Mahathir's government reviewed and canceled or delayed several mega infrastructure projects that were initiated by the previous administration. This included the cancellation of the Kuala Lumpur-Singapore High-Speed Rail project and the postponement of the East Coast Rail Link project.

== Capital punishment ==
On 11 October 2018, Mahathir cabinet announced plans to abolish the death penalty and halt pending executions, a move that has been hailed by international human rights groups and foreign diplomats. The pending abolishment, however, has triggered a storm of controversy. Multiple groups and people have come out against the abolition of the death penalty, including non-governmental Malay dominance organization, Perkasa.

On 13 March 2019, the government has reversed its earlier plan to repeal the death penalty. Mohamed Hanipa Maidin, a deputy minister in the Prime Minister’s Department, saying now intends to abolish mandatory capital punishment but will allow courts to decide whether a person convicted of a serious crime will be executed.

On 18 February 2020, Mahathir said the mandatory death penalty for drug trafficking might be amended to life sentence. He mentioned that the government would review drug-related laws, as certain groups argued that the penalties for offenders were excessively severe.

== Shared Prosperity Vision 2030 ==
On 14 September 2019, Mahathir chaired a special cabinet meeting on the Shared Prosperity Vision.

Mahathir officiated the new Shared Prosperity Vision 2030 in Kuala Lumpur October 5, 2019. He said SPV2030 can put Malaysia as a new Asian Tiger and provide a decent standard of living for all Malaysians by 2030. Mahathir also said Malaysia need to amputate the cancerous limbs of corruption and abuse of power. Economic Affairs Minister Azmin Ali said the SPV2030 is the country’s blueprint to generate rapid economic growth and create wealth so that prosperity could be shared together.

== Foreign relations ==
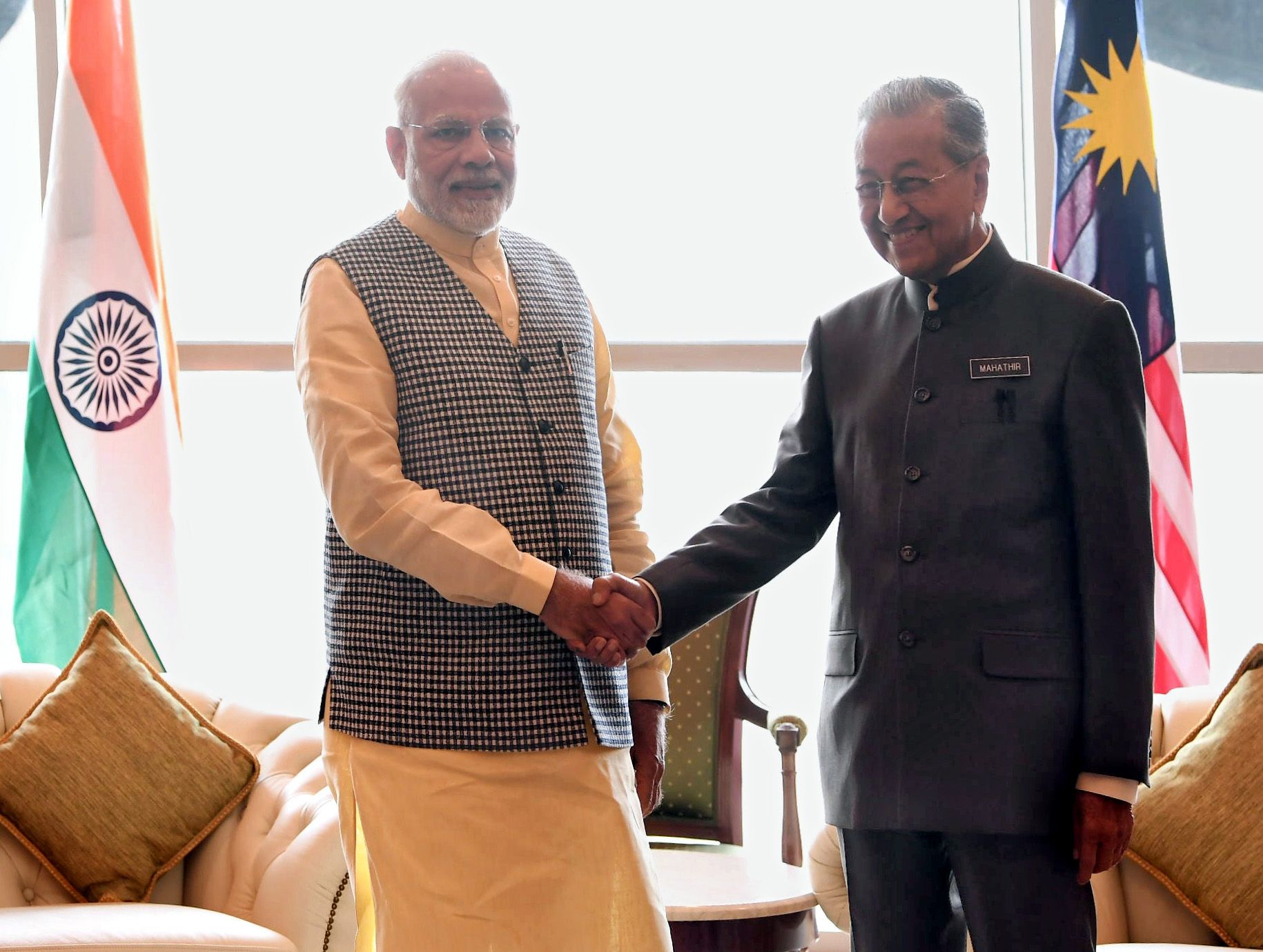
Mahathir and Indian Prime Minister Narendra Modi in Kuala Lumpur, 31 May 2018

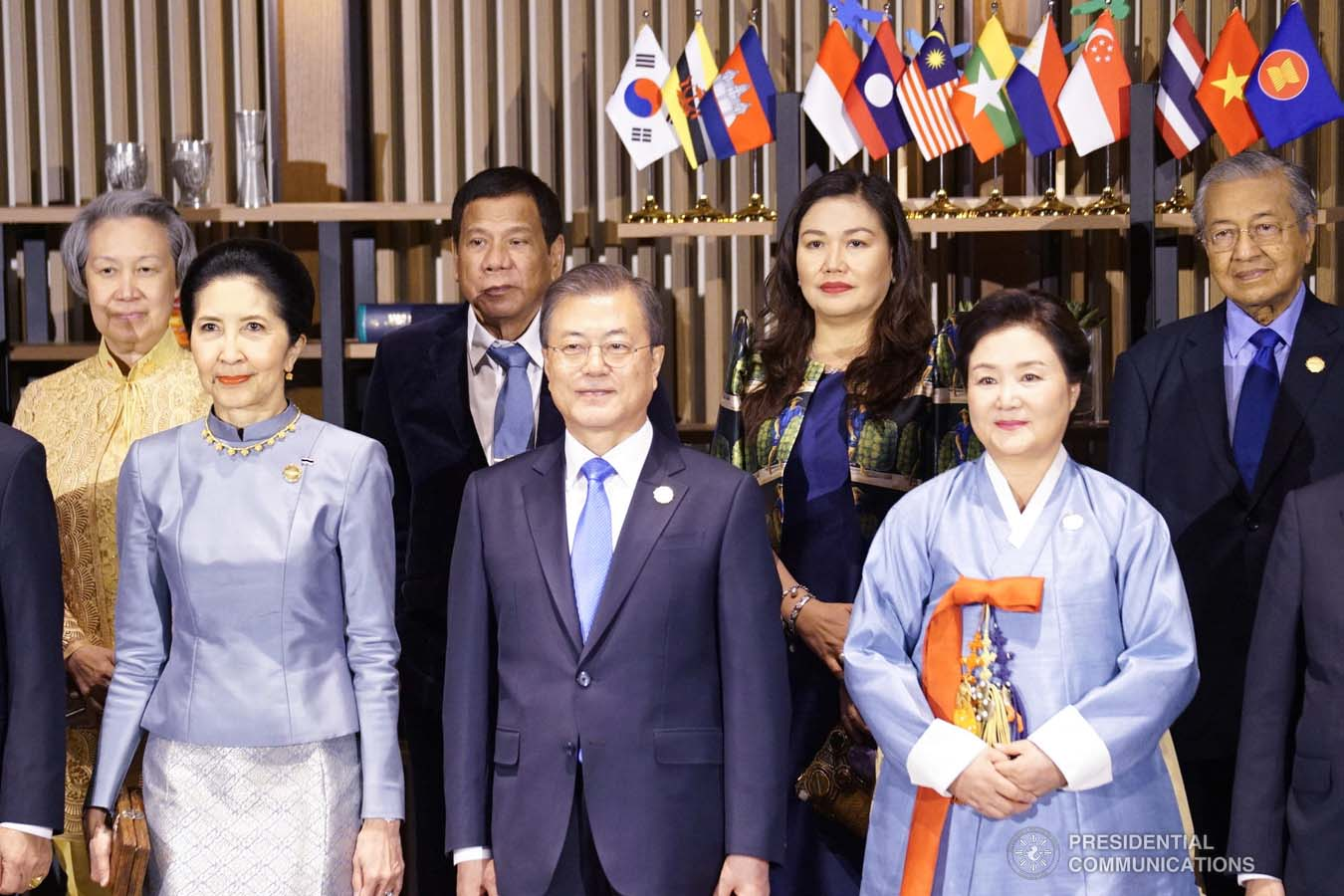
Mahathir join other leaders from the Association of Southeast Asian Nations (ASEAN) and Republic of Korea President Moon Jae-in, 26 November 2019

On 18 September 2019, Mahathir launched a new Foreign Policy Framework where Putrajaya pledged to prioritise maintaining good relations with other nations while practicing justice and fairness.

Mahathir refused to extradite Zakir Naik. Mahathir extradited Turkish national Arif Komis and his family, who were holding UNHCR refugee cards, in August 2019. Komis was later charged by the Turkish government for being part of the Gülen movement.

=== United States ===
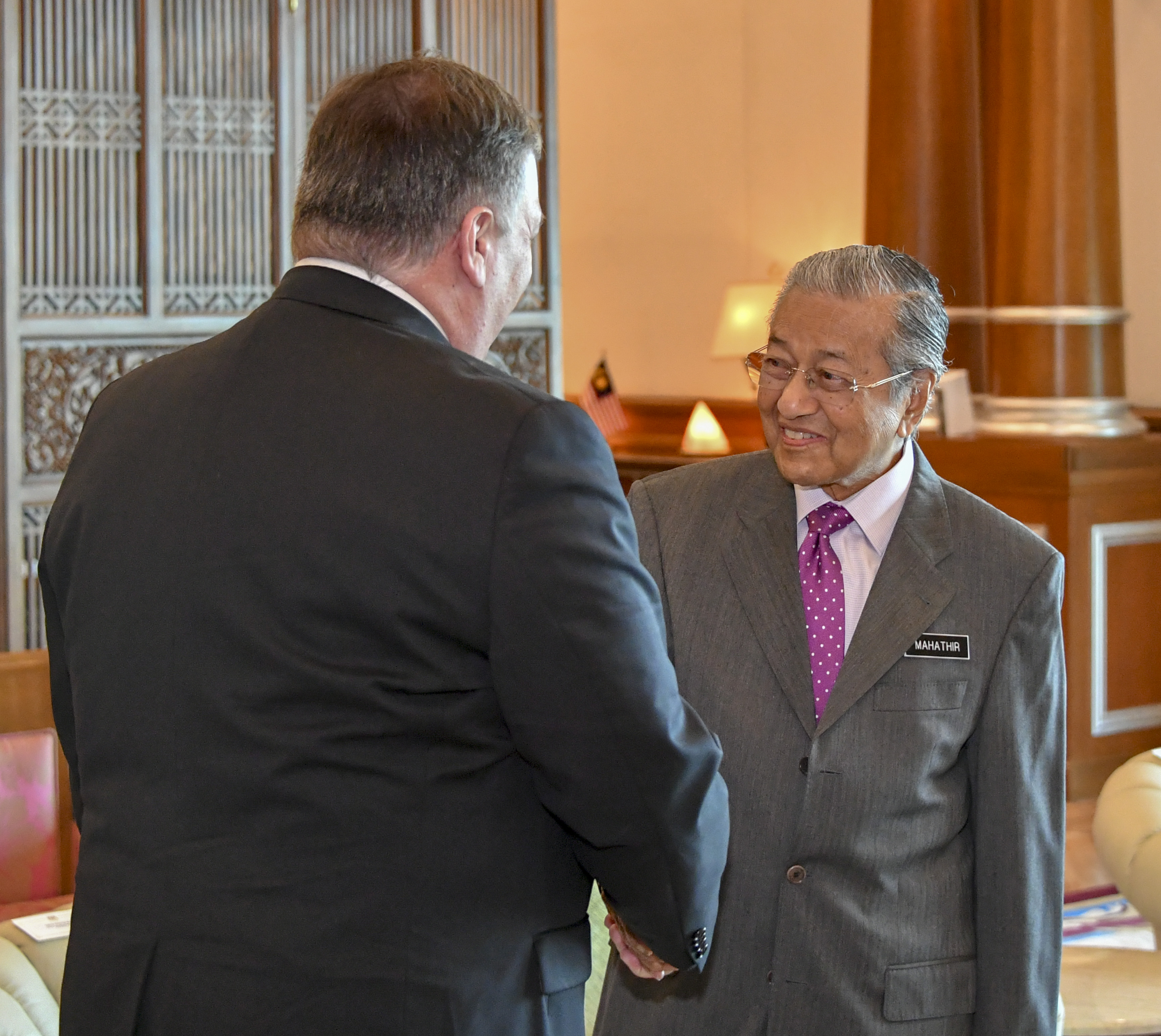
Mahathir meets with United States Secretary of State Mike Pompeo in 2018

On 11 May 2018, US President Donald Trump congratulated Mahathir on becoming the seventh prime minister of Malaysia, with the White House saying America is looking forward to working closely with it to address common international and regional challenges.

On 3 August 2018, Mahathir held a discussion with United States Secretary of State Mike Pompeo at Perdana Putra.

On 7 January 2020, Mahathir describing the U.S. killing of Iranian military commander Qassem Soleimani as immoral, and also against international laws.

=== Indonesia ===
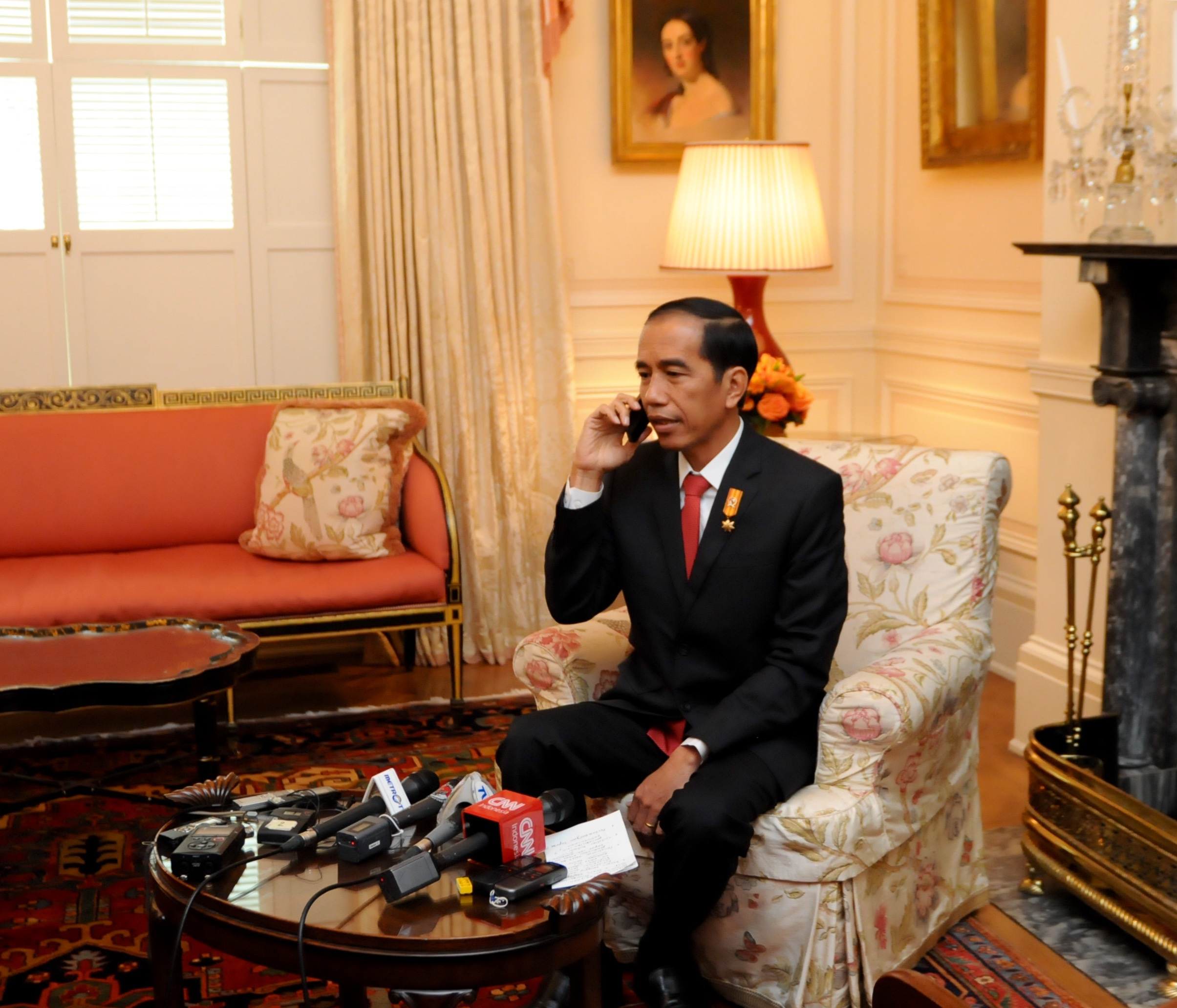
Indonesian President Joko Widodo congratulated Mahathir, through a telephone conversation on 10 May 2018

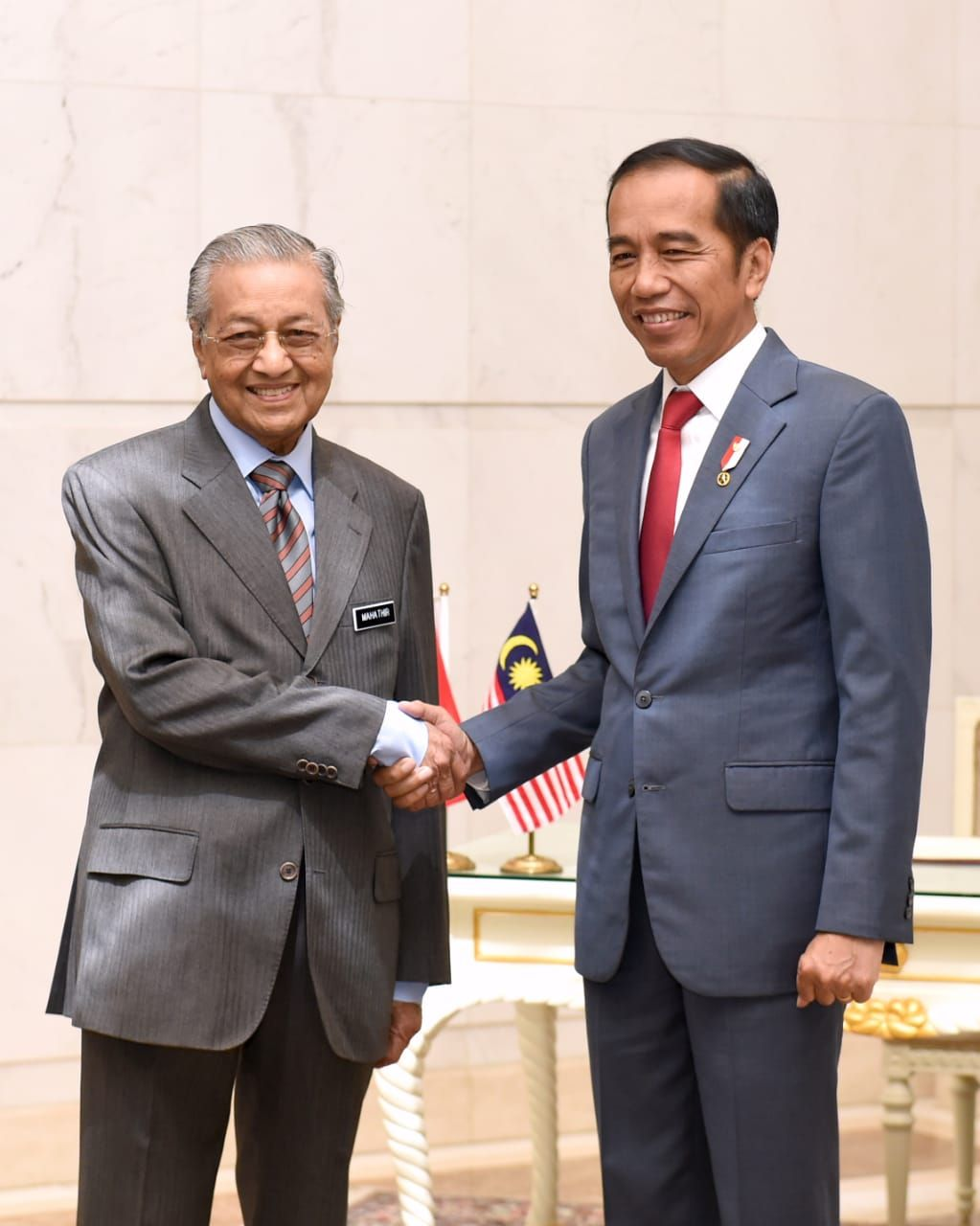
Mahathir and Joko Widodo in Putrajaya, 9 August 2019

On 28 June 2018, Mahathir arrived Jakarta for a two-day official visit to Indonesia, with Indonesian President Joko Widodo receiving the Malaysian leader at the airport in what has been described as a "rare honour". Mahathir met Joko Widodo at the Bogor Palace to discuss issues related to governance, corruption eradication, connectivity, border settlement, and politics.

On 21 May 2019, Mahathir congratulated Joko Widodo for his appointment as the President of Indonesia for the term 2019-2024.

On 9 August 2019, visiting Indonesian president Joko Widodo arrived at the Perdana Putra Building, Putrajaya for a four-eyed meeting with Mahathir. Mahathir drives Joko Widodo in a Proton Persona car to a luncheon he hosted at Seri Perdana.

=== North Korea ===
Mahathir was supportive of the 2018–19 Korean peace process. He said, "the world should not treat North Korean leader Kim Jong-un with scepticism and instead learn from his new attitude towards bringing about peace". In a joint press conference with Japan after the 2018 US-North Korea summit, Mahathir said, "we hoped for a successful outcome from the historic meeting", adding that "Malaysia will re-open their embassy in North Korea as an end to the diplomatic row over the assassination of Kim Jong-nam last year".

=== The Philippines ===
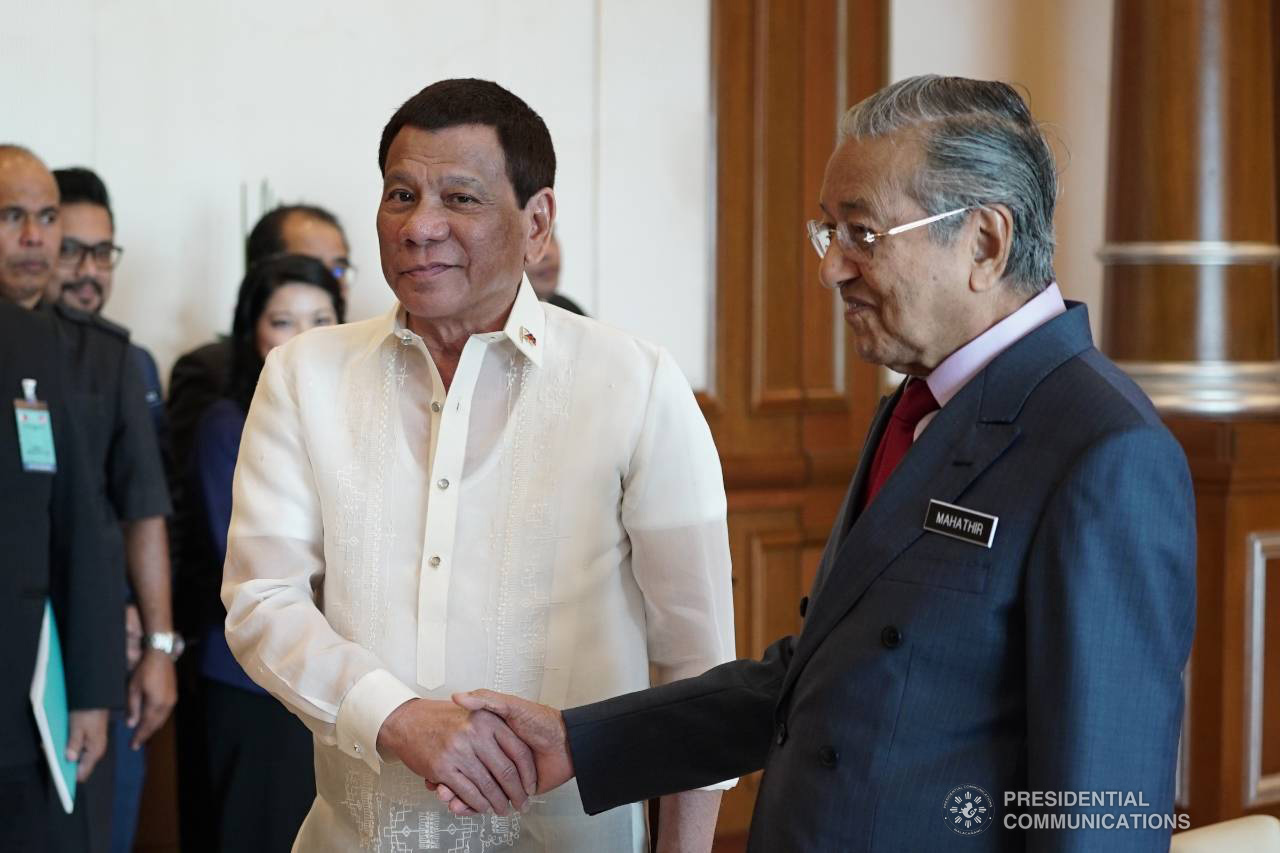
Mahathir and Philippine President Rodrigo Duterte pose for a photo before discussing matters on both countries' mutual interests during a meeting at the Prime Minister's Office in Perdana Putra, Putrajaya on July 16, 2018

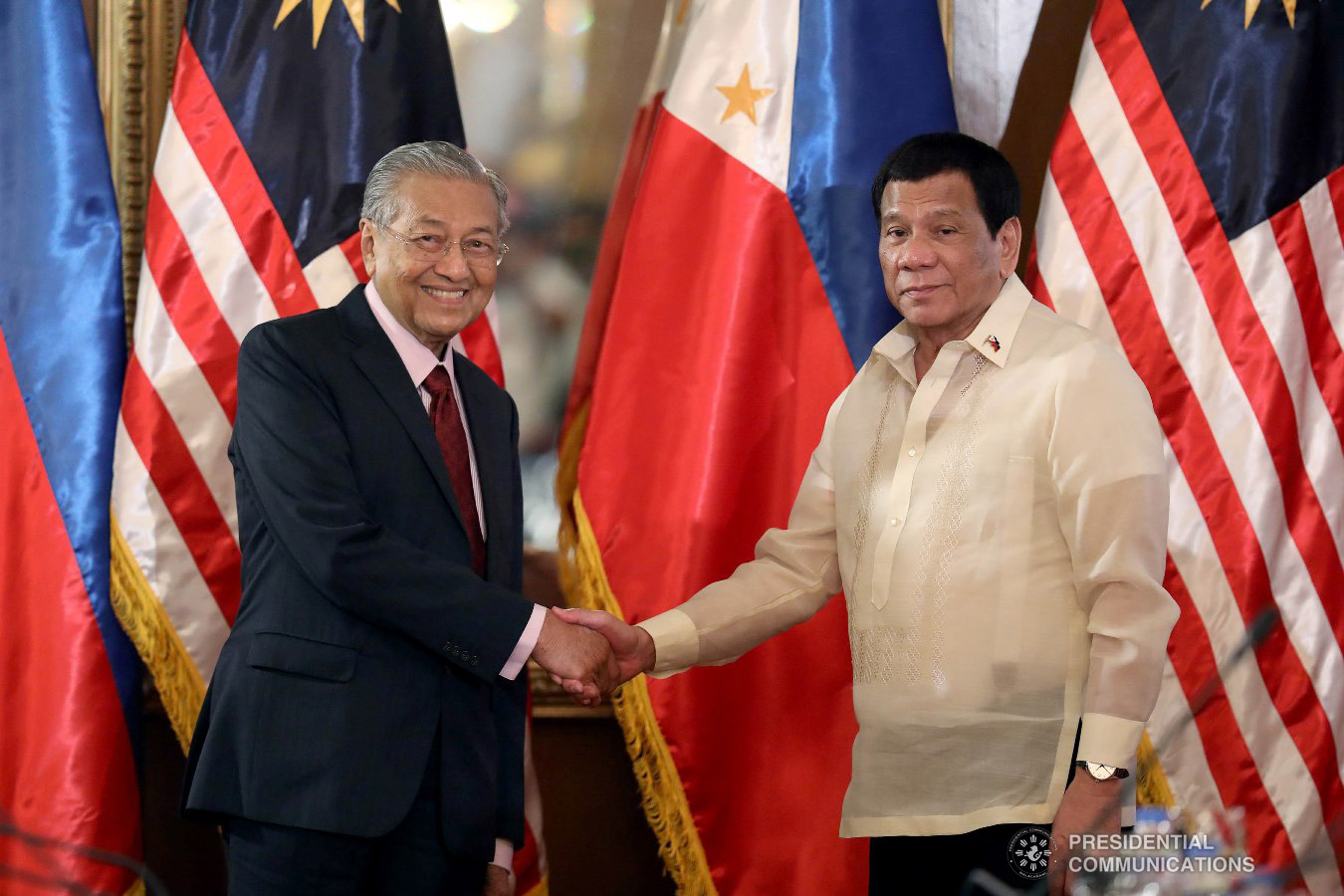
Mahathir and Duterte (7 March 2019)

On 16 July 2018, Mahathir met with Philippine President Rodrigo Duterte in Perdana Putra, Putrajaya. The two leaders talked about the Islamic State (IS) and pledged to curb the spread of extremism and terrorism in the Southeast Asian region.

On 6 March 2019, Mahathir has arrived in Manila for a three-day visit to the Philippines. He received a state welcome at Malacañang Palace, marking the first such reception given to a foreign head of government by the Philippines under the administration of President Rodrigo Duterte. The Philippines and Malaysia pledged to enhance their cooperation in tackling security issues in the region. This includes efforts to combat terrorism, piracy, and transnational crimes, as well as the fight against the illegal drug trade.

=== China ===
On 17 August 2018, Mahathir arrived Hangzhou to begin his five-day official visit to China, aimed at further strengthening the 44-year ties between Kuala Lumpur and Beijing.

He toured a Chinese car plant and e-commerce giant Alibaba, and rode China's fastest high-speed train from the tech hub of Hangzhou to Shanghai, before arriving at the Chinese capital. On a four-day state visit to China, Mahathir embarked on the delicate task of renegotiating $23bn in rail and pipeline deals agreed by his predecessor Najib Razak.

On 24 April 2019, Mahathir arrived in Beijing to attend the Second Belt and Road Forum for International Cooperation. On 26 April, he met with Chinese president Xi Jinping. Malaysia actively participated in China's Belt and Road Initiative (BRI), fostering economic cooperation.

In July 2019, on China's treatment of its Uyghur minority in Xinjiang, Mahathir said "we can condemn [China] but the fact is that the condemnation alone would not achieve anything."

On 13 February 2020, in the more than half-hour telephone conversation with Chinese president Xi Jinping, Mahathir conveyed Malaysia's solidarity with and unwavering support for China in managing the ongoing COVID-19 epidemic.

=== Pakistan ===
Mahathir was undertake an Official Visit to Pakistan from 21–23 March 2019

On 21 November 2018, Mahathir meet with Pakistani Prime Minister Imran Khan at the Prime Minister's Office in Putrajaya. The two leaders welcomed the set-up of the Bilateral Consultation between senior officials of both Ministries of Foreign Affairs. Mahathir believes that Malaysia and Pakistan share remarkable similarities in the sense. Imran Khan said Pakistan is keen to learn from the experience of Mahathir in transforming Malaysia's economy and development. Imran Khan was among the Pakistani politicians who expressed their admiration for Mahathir during their general election campaign.

On 21 March 2019, Mahathir being welcomed by Imran Khan at the Pakistan Air Force Nur Khan airbase in Rawalpindi during his official three-day visit to Pakistan. He was conferred the Nishan-e-Pakistan or Order of Pakistan, the country's highest civilian award.

On 29 September 2019, Mahathir said Malaysia, Turkey, and Pakistan have agreed to take certain measures to explain what Islam really is to the outside world, aiming to dispel misconceptions about the religion, including its alleged links to terrorism.

On 4 February 2020, Mahathir and visiting Imran Khan held a meeting at Perdana Putra to take stock of the existing cooperation between Malaysia and Pakistan. Imran Khan said Pakistan will do its best to purchase Malaysian palm oil to offset the loss with regard to the Indian market.

A luxury vehicle presented to Imran Khan by Mahathir was officially transferred to the government during a ceremony at the Malaysian High Commission in Islamabad. Razak Dawood, Khan’s commerce adviser, accepted the car on the prime minister's behalf.

=== Turkmenistan ===
On 27 October 2019, Mahathir arrived Ashgabat to begin his two-day official visit to Turkmenistan. After concluding the meeting with Turkmenistan President Gurbanguly Berdimuhamedov at the Presidential Palace, Mahathir stated that there are prospects of further cooperation between Malaysia and Turkmenistan in aerospace, the oil and gas industry, and cotton. He also said that Berdimuhamedov, at a meeting, has expressed the wish for the Turkmenistan government to extend the production sharing contract (PSC) with Petronas in the country until 2038.

== Speech ==
Date	Location	Title	Background and Overview
17 August 2018	Kuala Lumpur	The 100 Days of the Pakatan Harapan Government	Mahathir delivered a televised speech.
24 September 2018	London, United Kingdom	The Challenge of Good Governance in the Muslim World	Mahathir speech at the Oxford Centre for Islamic Studies.
1 October 2018	London, United Kingdom	Future Democracy in Asia	Mahathir delivering his speech at the Chatham House thinktank.
17 November 2018	Port Moresby, Papua New Guinea	Inclusion in the age of disruption: Charting a common future	Mahathir speech at the 2018 Asia-Pacific Economic Cooperation (APEC) CEO Summit.
2 September 2019	Phnom Penh, Cambodia	Balancing Relations with the Superpowers in the Context of ASEAN	Mahathir delivering his speech at Cambodia's oldest public university, the Royal University of Phnom Penh (RUPP).
15 October 2019	Kuala Lumpur	Advanced medical device innovation for improved healthcare	Mahathir delivering his speech at the International Medical Device Conference 2019 (IMDC), Malaysia Medical Device Expo 2019 (MYMEDEX) and Medical Innovation Exhibition and Conference 2019 (MEDINOVA).
25 October 2019	Baku, Azerbaijan	Upholding the Bandung principles to ensure concerted and adequate response to the challenges of the contemporary world	Mahathir delivering his speech at the 18th Non-Aligned Movement (NAM) Summit.

== 2020 political crisis and resignation ==
In February 2020, disagreements over who should lead the government culminated in a political crisis. MPs supporting Anwar demanded a timeframe for Mahathir's resignation and handover of power. Other MPs from several political parties held their own meetings on forming a new government with Mahathir remaining prime minister; Mahathir himself was not present. Around 131 MPs, including various opposition party leaders, gathered at the Sheraton Hotel in Petaling Jaya celebrating a "consensus". Anwar later confirmed a new governing coalition was being discussed, and added that he had been "betrayed" by Pakatan Harapan partners.

Anwar, Mahathir and other Pakatan leaders then met to clarify the situation; Mahathir said he was not involved in the attempt to form a new governing coalition.

Mahathir submitted his resignation to the Yang di-Pertuan Agong Abdullah of Pahang on 24 February 2020, refusing to work with UMNO leaders in a new government. The Agong accepted Mahathir's resignation, and appointed him as interim prime minister until a replacement could be appointed. BERSATU President Muhyiddin Yassin declared the party's withdrawal from the Pakatan Harapan coalition, causing a loss of parliamentary majority; Mahathir resigned from the party in response.

On 29 February, the Agong appointed Muhyiddin prime minister, determining that he was "most likely to have received the trust of the majority" of MPs. Mahathir challenged this, but his attempts to contact the Agong to seek legitimacy for his support were not answered. He left the Prime Minister's office an hour before Muhyiddin was sworn in.

Malaysian premierships
Preceded by Najib Razak	Mahathir Mohamad premiership 2018–2020	Succeeded by Muhyiddin Yassin
