= Koreans in Malaysia =

Ethnic group

Total population
- 13,152 (2023)

Regions with significant populations
- Kuala Lumpur: Ampang; Mont Kiara
- Selangor: Ampang; Bandar Sunway; Kota Damansara; Subang Jaya
- Penang
- Johor: Johor Bahru; Iskandar Puteri
- Sabah: Kota Kinabalu; Papar
- Sarawak: Sri Aman

Languages
- Korean, English, Malay

Religion
- Mainly Mahayana Buddhism, Christianity and other minorities

Related ethnic groups
- Korean diaspora

Koreans in Malaysia numbered 13,152 individuals as of 2023, making them the 22nd-largest community of overseas Koreans, and the 6th-largest in Southeast Asia.

== Migration history ==
The history of Koreans in Malaysia goes back almost half a century; Malaysia and South Korea established diplomatic relations in 1960, and in the following decade, when Malaysia faced a shortage of doctors, a number of foreign doctors, including Koreans and Filipinos, were authorised to practise in Malaysia. Some construction workers, pilots, and sailors were also sent to the country.

== Demography and distribution ==
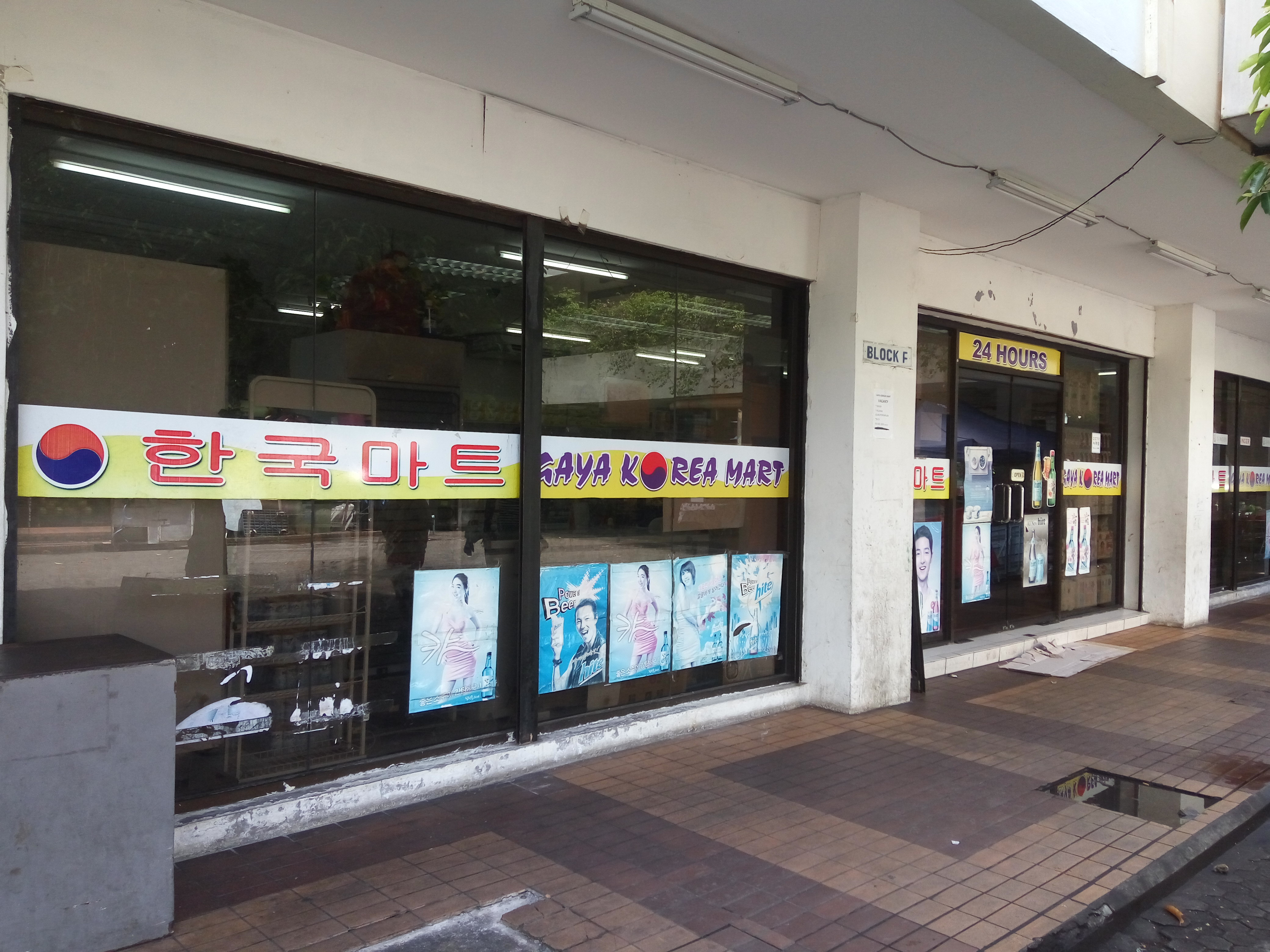
Korean shop at Singgah Mata Street, Kota Kinabalu, Sabah.

The Korean community in Malaysia consist mostly of migrants working in South Korean companies, as well as an increasing number of international students. The number of retirees coming under the Malaysia My Second Home immigration programme has also been increasing. Most Korean residents are concentrated in Penang, Kuala Lumpur and Selangor, especially in Ampang, where a Koreatown is beginning to sprout. The popularity of Korean dramas in Malaysia has meant an increasingly friendly reception for Korean migrants by local people. Real estate investment is another factor drawing Koreans to migrate to Malaysia, due to the taxes imposed on people who own more than two properties in Korea; Malaysia is the second most popular market for overseas real estate investment by Koreans, after the United States.

Around 200,000 South Korean tourists came to Malaysia in 2006; Kota Kinabalu was their most popular destination. About 1,800 to 2,000 Koreans reside in Sabah, most of them in Kota Kinabalu. Sabah Oil and Gas Terminal project in Kimanis, Papar has brought South Korean employees of Samsung Engineering to work and live there until the terminal completion in December 2013.

There were also some North Koreans working in Sarawak in the mine industry. This was revealed after a tragedy that killed one and injuring seven others North Koreans in 2014. By September 2017, the state Immigration Department has confirmed there are no more North Koreans working in Sarawak with the coal mine also had stopped their operation.

== Education ==
Roughly 2,000 of the Koreans in Malaysia are students; Malaysia's multicultural environment offers them the chance to practise English as well as study other languages such as Chinese or Malay; they describe the educational environment as being more relaxed than in Korea. Korean churches form an important part of their social life. Their parents also prefer Malaysia to other countries for several reasons. The low cost of living and education in Malaysia is a major pull factor; Parents also believe Malaysia offers a better environment for English study than neighbouring countries. A representative from one Seoul company which helps to arrange overseas study for local students estimated that 90% of Korean students going to Southeast Asia choose Malaysia as their destination. However, some international schools have stopped accepting Korean students because they have become too large a proportion of their student bodies. In many cases, mothers come to Malaysia with their young school-age children, while the breadwinning father remains behind in South Korea and sends money to support them.

Malaysia's first officially registered weekend school for Korean nationals, the Malaysia Korean School, was established on 7 December 1974; it had 26 teachers and enrolled 148 students as of 2006. It was located on Jalan Ampang in Kuala Lumpur. The first day school for Korean families, the Korean School of Malaysia, opened in Cyberjaya in 2016.

== See also ==
- Malaysian English
- Japanese in Malaysia
