= Malaysia–South Korea relations =

- Malaysia: South Korea

Malaysia–South Korea relations are the bilateral foreign relations between Malaysia and South Korea. Malaysia has an embassy in Seoul, and South Korea has an embassy in Kuala Lumpur. The two countries established relations in 1960. After cutting ties with North Korea in 2021 over an extradition, Malaysia recognized the Republic of Korea as the sole legitimate government of all of Korea.

== History ==
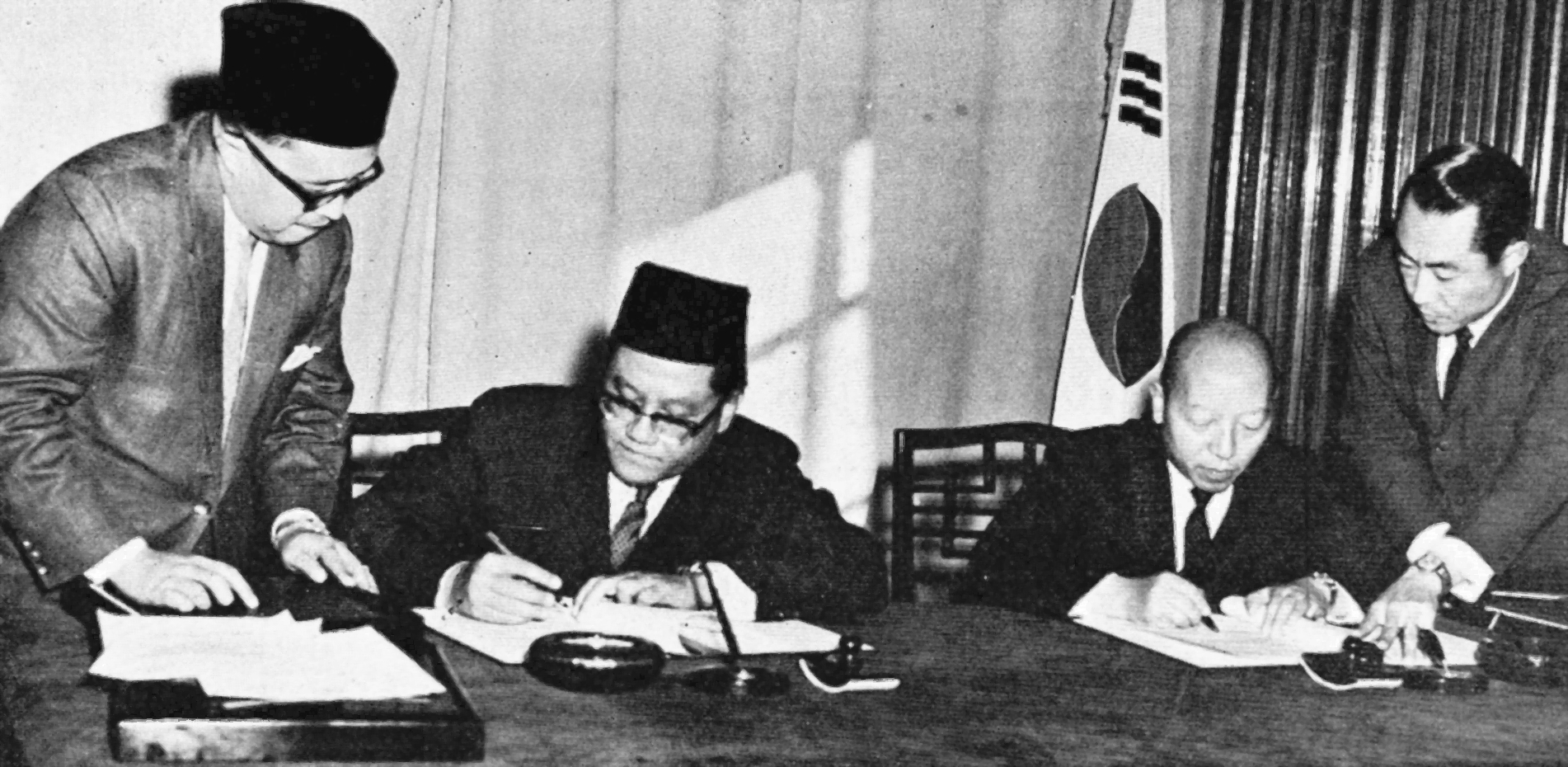
Minister for Agriculture of Malaysia Khir Johari and the foreign minister of South Korea Choe Deok-sin sign the first ever trade agreement between those two countries in Seoul, 1962-11-05.

Relations between the two countries began on 23 February 1960 with visits between the leaders of each nation.

== Economic relations ==
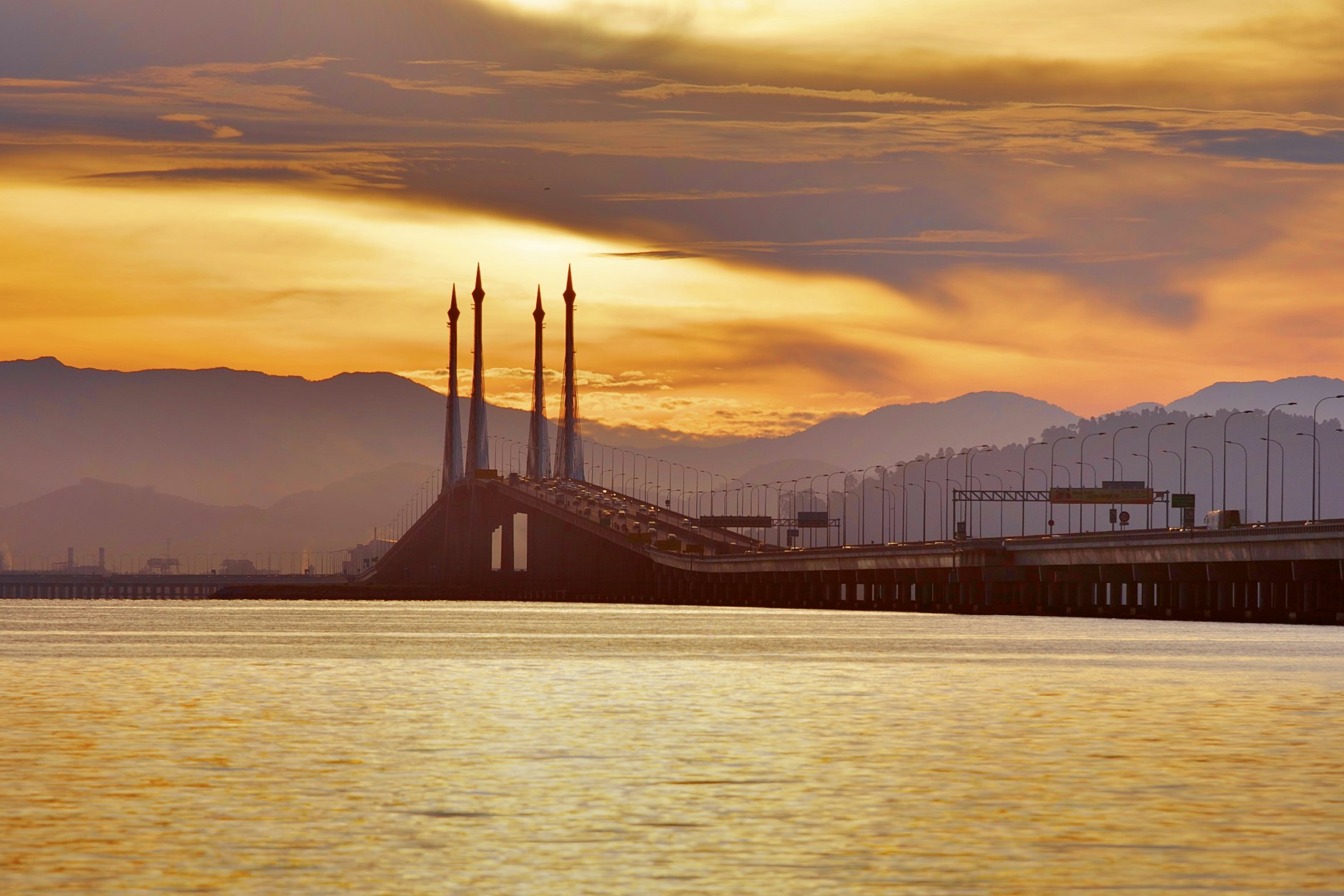
The Penang Bridge, jointly built by Hyundai and Malaysian companies, was Southeast Asia's longest bridge upon its completion in 1985.

Since 1980, South Korea emerged as one of Malaysia's main foreign direct investment sources. Until 1996, a total of 235 South Korean investments projects to Malaysia worth RM4.6 billion were approved for the manufacturing sector, comprising the production of non-metallic products, electrical and electronic products, wood and wood products, rubber products and chemicals. From 2004 until 2008, Malaysia's trade with South Korea increased by 6.7% from US$9.7 billion in 2004 to US$15.4 billion. In 2012, another 287 projects have been implemented with an investment of RM7.7 billion. The trade value reached almost US$20 billion in 2018, making Malaysia as the South Korea's 14th largest business partner. In 2018, South Korean SK Group signed a memorandum of understanding (MoU) with Malaysia to invest in the latter by collaborating in information and communications technology (ICT) and 5G, oil and gas, green technology and urban development.

In April 2025, South Korea and Malaysia will gather in Seoul to sign a bilateral free trade agreement. About 70 officials from the two countries will attend the eighth official meeting from Apr. 08 to Apr. 11, and the agreement will bridge the gap in 10 priority areas, including trade in goods, services, and economic cooperation.

== Movement of people ==
The number of South Korean expatriates in Malaysia nearly tripled between 2005 and 2007, reaching 14,934 individuals, and is expected to continue to grow rapidly. Furthermore, around 200,000 South Korean tourists came to Malaysia in 2006; Kota Kinabalu was their most popular destination.

Malaysians in South Korea form a much smaller community. The Malaysian ambassador to South Korea, M. Santhananaban, estimated in 2005 that there were 400 Malaysian international students in the country. Their presence in South Korea is an outgrowth of Mahathir Mohamad's "Look East" policy, which encouraged Malaysians to learn from and emulate the attitudes and work ethic of South Korea and Japan. In 2008, the South Korean government gave out scholarships totalling RM8 million to forty-one Malaysian students to support their pursuit of master's degrees, doctoral degrees, or other post-graduate research in South Korea.

== See also ==
- Koreans in Malaysia
