= Foreign relations of Belgium =

Belgium is a country in Europe and member of major international organizations like the European Union and NATO which are both headquartered in Brussels, Belgium.

As a federal state, the Communities and Regions have their own foreign relations and are able to conclude treaties themselves.

== Initial neutrality ==
Because of its location at the crossroads of Western Europe, Belgium has historically been the route of invading armies from its larger neighbours. With virtually defenceless borders, Belgium has traditionally sought to avoid domination by the more powerful nations which surround it through a policy of mediation. The Concert of Europe sanctioned the creation of Belgium in 1831 on the condition that the country remain strictly neutral.

This policy of neutrality ended after the experience of German occupation during World War I. In the years preceding World War II, Belgium tried to return to a policy of neutrality, but once again, Germany invaded the country. In 1948, Belgium signed the Treaty of Brussels with the United Kingdom, France, the Netherlands, and Luxembourg, and one year later became one of the founding members of the Atlantic Alliance.

== Belgium's federalism and international relations ==
A peculiar feature of Belgian federalism is the fact that the country's Communities and Regions maintain their own international relations, including the conclusion of treaties. Thus, there are a number of bilateral Dutch-Flemish international institutions, such as the Dutch Language Union or the institutions for the control of the river Scheldt, in which only Flanders takes part. Likewise, only the French Community of Belgium takes part in La Francophonie. For instance, UNV's Online Volunteering service received a financial contribution from the Federal Public Service (FPS) Foreign Affairs, Foreign Trade and Development Cooperation of the Kingdom of Belgium for the years 2013 and 2014 to support the outreach to the francophone world and the promotion of volunteerism.

== International disputes ==
Belgium has resorted several times to international dispute settlement, notably in cases at both the International Court of Justice and the Permanent Court of Arbitration with the Netherlands concerning the diversion of water from the Meuse (1937) the frontier at the enclave of Baarle-Hertog (1959) and the revitalisation of the so-called Iron Rhine railroad (2005). There have been other points of contention with the Netherlands, such as the deepening of the river Scheldt or the route for the high-speed rail link between Brussels and Amsterdam. This does however not influence the overall amicable character of Belgo-Dutch relationship.

Other former cases at international courts between Belgium and other countries are — in chronological order — the Oscar Chinn Case of 1934 (with the United Kingdom, the Borghgrave Case of 1937 (with Spain), the cases of the electricity company of Sofia of 1939 (with Bulgaria), the case of the "société commerciale de Belgique" of 1939 (with Greece), the case concerning the Barcelona Traction Company of 1970 (with Spain), the arrest warrant case of 2002 (with the Democratic Republic of the Congo) and the case concerning legality of use of force of 2004 (with Serbia and Montenegro).

The arrest warrant case of 2002 was caused by the application of Belgium's so called genocide law, providing for universal jurisdiction over the gravest international crimes. The same law stirred relations with, amongst others, Israel and the United States, since complaints were filed against high-ranking politicians and officials of both countries. The law was therefore repealed in 2003.

== Diplomatic relations ==
List of countries which Belgium maintains diplomatic relations with:

#	Country	Date
1	United Kingdom	1 December 1830
2	France	8 March 1831
3	United States	18 June 1832
4	Portugal	20 February 1834
5	Brazil	27 February 1834
—	Holy See	17 July 1834
6	Spain	November 1834
7	Denmark	25 February 1837
8	Sweden	25 February 1837
9	Mexico	March 1838
10	Greece	11 December 1838
11	Netherlands	8 June 1839
12	Switzerland	30 September 1845
13	Peru	16 May 1850
14	Guatemala	27 September 1850
15	Italy	24 February 1851
16	Russia	11 April 1853
17	Uruguay	30 April 1853
18	Honduras	27 March 1858
19	Nicaragua	18 May 1858
20	Costa Rica	26 July 1858
21	Chile	2 September 1859
22	Argentina	3 March 1860
23	Paraguay	17 June 1863
24	Japan	1 August 1866
25	Liberia	5 June 1867
26	Colombia	20 June 1871
27	Ecuador	16 July 1879
28	Bulgaria	11 December 1879
29	Romania	29 March 1880
30	Venezuela	21 April 1880
31	Thailand	21 July 1883
32	Serbia	15 March 1886
33	Iran	27 November 1889
34	El Salvador	1 July 1890
35	Dominican Republic	10 April 1891
36	Luxembourg	18 April 1892
37	Haiti	15 January 1902
38	Cuba	18 August 1902
39	Norway	14 November 1905
40	Panama	15 February 1908
41	Bolivia	18 April 1912
42	Poland	6 March 1919
43	Czech Republic	3 June 1919
44	Finland	9 July 1919
45	Austria	16 August 1920
46	Hungary	20 February 1922
47	Egypt	10 May 1922
48	Afghanistan	26 February 1923
49	Ethiopia	25 March 1923
50	Turkey	10 February 1925
51	Monaco	2 October 1931
52	Ireland	7 September 1932
53	South Africa	28 August 1933
54	Canada	3 January 1939
55	Lebanon	25 November 1944
56	Iceland	9 November 1945
57	Syria	20 March 1946
58	Philippines	4 July 1946
59	Iraq	5 December 1946
60	Jordan	4 May 1947
61	India	20 September 1947
62	New Zealand	27 November 1947
63	Australia	30 January 1948
64	Pakistan	20 February 1948
65	Israel	22 September 1949
66	Indonesia	14 November 1949
67	Germany	27 June 1951
68	Sri Lanka	27 July 1953
69	Myanmar	19 September 1953
70	Saudi Arabia	10 April 1955
71	Cambodia	8 June 1955
72	Libya	15 May 1956
73	Sudan	23 July 1956
74	Morocco	21 August 1956
75	Tunisia	21 May 1957
76	Malaysia	12 December 1957
77	Ghana	13 January 1960
78	Guinea	28 January 1960
79	Democratic Republic of the Congo	2 July 1960
80	Somalia	5 July 1960
81	Cyprus	16 August 1960
82	Gabon	3 October 1960
83	Benin	3 January 1961
84	Senegal	1 February 1961
85	Nigeria	4 February 1961
86	Ivory Coast	15 March 1961
87	Mauritania	13 April 1961
88	Republic of the Congo	15 April 1961
89	South Korea	2 May 1961
90	Chad	27 June 1961
91	Sierra Leone	12 July 1961
92	Niger	22 September 1961
93	Burkina Faso	17 October 1961
94	Cameroon	14 March 1962
95	Burundi	18 July 1962
96	Rwanda	18 July 1962
97	Tanzania	21 August 1962
98	Algeria	11 December 1962
99	Central African Republic	13 June 1963
100	Mali	1 August 1963
101	Nepal	19 August 1963
102	Kuwait	8 April 1964
103	Kenya	29 April 1964
104	Madagascar	15 July 1964
105	Zambia	6 December 1964
106	Uganda	17 December 1964
107	Malta	June 1965
108	Togo	29 November 1965
109	Malawi	28 January 1966
110	Gambia	7 February 1966
111	Singapore	10 October 1966
112	Jamaica	25 July 1967
113	Botswana	24 August 1967
114	Lesotho	24 August 1967
115	Laos	12 December 1967
116	Mauritius	November 1968
117	Eswatini	14 November 1969
118	Trinidad and Tobago	10 May 1970
119	Barbados	30 October 1970
120	Albania	13 November 1970
121	Guyana	10 June 1971
122	Mongolia	8 July 1971
123	Tonga	16 August 1971
124	China	25 October 1971
125	United Arab Emirates	8 December 1971
126	Yemen	8 November 1971
127	Fiji	September 1972
128	Vietnam	22 March 1973
129	Bangladesh	15 May 1973
130	Samoa	May 1973
131	Qatar	21 November 1973
132	Bahamas	12 December 1973
133	Equatorial Guinea	12 December 1973
134	Oman	22 May 1974
135	Nauru	4 July 1975
136	Mozambique	5 December 1975
137	Seychelles	1 July 1976
138	Papua New Guinea	16 September 1976
139	Suriname	1 October 1976
140	Angola	15 October 1976
141	Comoros	15 November 1976
142	Cape Verde	12 July 1977
143	Guinea-Bissau	2 August 1977
144	Maldives	3 October 1977
145	Djibouti	19 June 1978
146	Solomon Islands	28 February 1979
147	Zimbabwe	24 April 1980
148	Bahrain	2 December 1980
149	Dominica	1980
150	Saint Lucia	1980
151	Saint Vincent and the Grenadines	1980
152	Vanuatu	10 June 1981
153	Belize	1982
154	Brunei	3 May 1984
155	San Marino	26 March 1985
156	Antigua and Barbuda	30 October 1985
157	São Tomé and Príncipe	1986
158	Namibia	21 September 1990
159	Estonia	5 September 1991
160	Latvia	5 September 1991
161	Lithuania	5 September 1991
162	Slovenia	5 March 1992
163	Armenia	10 March 1992
164	Belarus	10 March 1992
165	Ukraine	10 March 1992
166	Uzbekistan	10 March 1992
167	Moldova	11 March 1992
168	Liechtenstein	13 March 1992
169	Kyrgyzstan	25 March 1992
170	Tajikistan	29 April 1992
171	Georgia	5 June 1992
172	Azerbaijan	17 June 1992
173	Kazakhstan	18 August 1992
174	Croatia	25 September 1992
175	Slovakia	1 January 1993
176	Turkmenistan	1 February 1993
177	North Macedonia	14 February 1994
178	Bosnia and Herzegovina	3 March 1994
179	Eritrea	31 March 1994
180	Andorra	15 December 1994
181	Marshall Islands	29 May 1996
182	Federated States of Micronesia	28 October 1996
183	North Korea	23 January 2001
184	Timor-Leste	3 October 2002
185	Saint Kitts and Nevis	7 July 2004
—	Cook Islands	6 April 2005
186	Montenegro	25 June 2006
—	Kosovo	10 April 2008
187	Bhutan	21 January 2009
188	Palau	18 May 2010
189	South Sudan	14 October 2011
190	Grenada	Unknown
191	Kiribati	Unknown
192	Tuvalu	Unknown

== Relationship with countries ==
=== Africa ===
Country	Formal Relations Began	Notes
Congo-Kinshasa	2 July 1960	See Belgium–Democratic Republic of the Congo relations Diplomatic relations were established on 2 July 1960 when establishment of the Belgian diplomatic mission in Leopoldville and Jean Van den Bosch becomes the Belgian ambassador.: Belgium has an embassy in Kinshasa and a consulate-general in Lubumbashi.; Congo-Kinshasa has an embassy in Brussels and a consulate-general in Antwerp.
Eritrea		Belgium recognised Eritrea as an independent country on 14 June 1993.
South Sudan	14 October 2011	Diplomatic relations were established on 14 October 2011.: Belgium recognised South Sudan as an independent country on 1 December 2011.

=== Americas ===
Country	Formal Relations Began	Notes
Canada	3 January 1939	See Belgium–Canada relations Diplomatic relations were established on 3 January 1939.: Both are close allies and members of NATO and Francophonie. Both have a stance of multilateralism and have similar government systems.; Both were actively involved in the war in Afghanistan under ISAF.; Belgium has an embassy in Ottawa and a consulate-general in Montreal.; Canada has an embassy in Brussels.
Cuba	18 August 1902	Diplomatic relations were established on 18 August 1902. In 1837, Belgian negotiating sale right ownership of Cuba from Spanish government.: Belgium has an embassy in Havana.; Cuba has an embassy in Brussels.
Mexico	19 November 1839	See Belgium–Mexico relations Diplomatic relations were established on 19 November 1839. In 1836, Belgium—itself newly independent—recognized the independence of Mexico. In 1919, the Belgian chamber of commerce of Mexico was established. Belgium opened its embassy in Mexico on 5 June 1954.: Belgium has an embassy in Mexico City.; Mexico has an embassy in Brussels.
Peru	16 May 1850	Diplomatic relations were established on 16 May 1850. Main article: Belgium–Peru relations: Belgium has an embassy in Lima.; Peru has an embassy in Brussels.
United States	9 February 1832	See Belgium–United States relations Diplomatic relations were established on 9 February 1832 when has been accredited Minister Resident of Belgium to United States with residence in Washington baron D. Behr. The United States and Belgium are good friends and allies, despite occasional disagreements on a limited number of foreign policy issues. Good will and affection for Americans continues as a result of the U.S. role during and after the two World Wars, which was exhibited in 2004 during the 60th anniversary commemorations of the Battle of the Bulge and the liberation of Belgium. Continuing to celebrate cooperative U.S. and Belgian relations, 2007 marks the 175th anniversary of the nations' relationship.: Belgium has an embassy in Washington, D.C., and consulates-general in Atlanta, Los Angeles and New York City.; United States has an embassy in Brussels.
Uruguay	26 September 1852	See Belgium–Uruguay relations Diplomatic relations were established on 26 September 1852 when M. Joseph Lannoy has been appointed as Minister Resident of Belgium to Uruguay with Residence in Rio-de-Janeiro.: Belgium is accredited to Uruguay from its embassy in Buenos Aires, Argentina.; Uruguay has an embassy in Brussels.

=== Asia ===
Country	Formal Relations Began	Notes
Armenia	10 March 1992	Diplomatic relations were established on 10 March 1992.: Belgium recognised Armenia as an independent country effective from 31 December 1991.; Armenia has an embassy in Brussels.; Belgium is accredited to Armenia from its embassy in Moscow, Russia and maintains an honorary consulate in Yerevan.; Belgium has recognized the Armenian genocide in 1998.
Azerbaijan	17 June 1992	See Azerbaijan–Belgium relations Diplomatic relations were established on 17 June 1992.: Belgium recognised Azerbaijan as an independent country effective from 31 December 1991.; Azerbaijan has an embassy in Brussels.; Belgium has an embassy in Baku.; Both countries are full members of the Council of Europe and the Organization for Security and Co-operation in Europe (OSCE).
China	25 October 1971	See Belgium–China relations Diplomatic relations were established on 25 October 1971.: Belgium has an embassy in Beijing and consulates-general in Guangzhou, Hong Kong and Shanghai.; China has an embassy in Brussels.
Georgia	5 June 1992	Diplomatic relations were established on 5 June 1992.: Belgium recognised Georgia as an independent country on 23 March 1992.; Belgium is represented in Georgia through its embassy in Baku, Azerbaijan; Georgia has an embassy in Brussels
India	20 September 1947	See Belgium–India relations Diplomatic relations were established on 20 September 1947 when Prince Eugene de Ligne presented his credentials as the Ambassador of the Kingdom of Belgium to India.: Belgium has an embassy in New Delhi and consualates-general in Chennai and Mumbai.; India has an embassy in Brussels.
Indonesia	14 June 1950	See Belgium–Indonesia relations Diplomatic relations were established on 14 June 1950 when Consulate General of Belgium in Jakarta has been elevated to rang Legation and M. P. Vanderstichelen appointed as Envoy Extraordinary and Minister Plenipotentiary of Belgium to Indonesia.: Belgium has an embassy in Jakarta.; Indonesia has an embassy in Brussels.
Iran		Belgium has an embassy in Tehran.; Iran has an embassy in Brussels.
Israel		See Belgium–Israel relations: On 29 November 1947, Belgium voted in favour of UN resolution 181.; Belgium recognised Israel on 15 January 1950.; Belgium has an embassy in Tel Aviv.; Israel has an embassy in Brussels.; There are approximately 31,200 Jews living in Belgium.
Japan	1 August 1866	See Belgium–Japan relations Diplomatic relations were established on 1 August 1866.: Belgium has an embassy in Tokyo.; Japan has an embassy in Brussels.
Kazakhstan	25 August 1992	See Belgium–Kazakhstan relations Diplomatic relations were established on 25 August 1992.: Belgium recognised Kazakhstan as an independent country effective from 31 December 1991.; Belgium has an embassy in Astana.; Kazakhstan has an embassy in Brussels.
Kyrgyzstan	25 March 1992	See Belgium–Turkey relations Diplomatic relations were established on 25 March 1992.: Belgium recognised Kyrgyzstan as an independent country effective from 20 januari 1992.
Malaysia	12 December 1957	See Belgium–Malaysia relations Diplomatic relations were established on 12 December 1957.: Belgium has an embassy in Kuala Lumpur.; Malaysia has an embassy in Brussels.
Pakistan	20 February 1948	See Belgium–Pakistan relations Diplomatic relations were established on 20 February 1948.: Belgium has an embassy in Islamabad.; Pakistan has an embassy in Brussels.; Former Pakistani president, Pervez Musharraf, has also previously extended a visit to Belgium during his tour of Europe in early 2008, which also included visits to the United Kingdom, France and Sweden. During his stay in Brussels, he met the then-Prime Minister of Belgium, Guy Verhofstadt, and the two leaders held significant talks on trade and defence co-operation.
Philippines	18 May 1949	See Belgium–Philippines relations Diplomatic relations were established on 18 May 1949.: Belgium has an embassy in Manila.; Philippines has an embassy in Brussels.
Saudi Arabia		Belgium has an embassy in Riyadh.; Saudi Arabia has an embassy in Brussels.
South Korea	2 May 1961	See Belgium–South Korea relations Diplomatic relations were established on 2 May 1961.: Belgium has an embassy in Seoul.; South Korea has an embassy in Brussels.; A Working Holiday Visa program has signed by the two governments of Belgian with South Korean in 2015.
Syria	20 March 1946	See Belgium–Syria relations Relations were established on 20 March 1946 when M.R. Taymans was appointed as Chargé d'Affaires of Belgium to Syria with residence in Beirut.: Belgium had an embassy in Damascus, which was closed in 2012.; Syria has an embassy in Brussels.
Turkey	4 April 1838	See Belgium–Turkey relations Diplomatic relations were established on 4 April 1838 when has been accredited Envoy Extraordinary and Minister Plenipotentiary of Belgium to Turkey baron O'Sullivan de Grass.: Belgium has an embassy in Ankara and a consulate–general in Istanbul.; Turkey has an embassy in Brussels and a consulate–general in Antwerp.; Both countries are full members of NATO.; Belgium opposes Turkey's EU membership.
Turkmenistan	1 February 1993	See Belgium–Turkey relations Diplomatic relations were established on 1 February 1993.: Belgium recognised Turkmenistan as an independent country effective from 31 December 1991.
Uzbekistan	10 March 1992	See Belgium–Turkey relations Diplomatic relations were established on 10 March 1992.: Belgium recognised Uzbekistan as an independent country effective from 31 December 1991.

=== Europe ===
Country	Formal Relations Began	Notes
Albania		See Albania–Belgium relations: Albania has an embassy in Brussels.; Belgium has an embassy in Tirana.
Andorra	15 December 1994	Diplomatic relations were established on 15 December 1994.: Belgium has recognised Andorra as an independent country on 2 December 1993, effective from 28 July 1993.; Andorra has an embassy in Brussels.; Belgium is accredited to Andorra from its embassy in Madrid, Spain.
Austria		Austria has an embassy in Brussels.; Belgium has an embassy in Vienna.; Both countries are full members of the European Union.
Belarus	10 March 1992	Diplomatic relations were established on 10 March 1992.: Belgium recognised Belarus as an independent country effective from 31 December 1991.
Bosnia and Herzegovina	3 March 1994	Diplomatic relations were established on 3 March 1994.: Belgium recognised Bosnia as an independent country on 10 April 1992.
Bulgaria	11 December 1879	Diplomatic relations were established on 11 December 1879.: Belgium has an embassy in Sofia.; Bulgaria has an embassy in Brussels.; Both countries are full members of Francophonie, NATO and of the European Union.
Croatia	10 March 1992	Diplomatic relations were established on 10 March 1992.: Belgium recognised Croatia as an independent country effective from 15 January 1992.; Belgium has an embassy in Zagreb.; Croatia has an embassy in Brussels.; Both countries are full members of the European Union and NATO.
Cyprus		Belgium is accredited to Cyprus from its embassy in Athens, Greece.; Cyprus is accredited to Belgium from its embassy in The Hague, the Netherlands.; Both countries are full members of the European Union.
Czech Republic	3 June 1919	Belgium and Czechoslovakia established diplomatic relations on 3 June 1919.: Belgium recognised the independence of Czechia on 16 February 1993, effective from 1 January 1993.; Belgium has an embassy in Prague.; Czech Republic has an embassy in Brussels.; Both countries are full members of NATO and of the European Union.
Denmark	25 February 1837	See Belgium–Denmark relations Diplomatic relations were established on 25 February 1837 when has been accredited chargé d'affaires of Belgium to Denmark baron T. van der Straten-Ponthoz: Belgium has an embassy in Copenhagen.; Denmark has an embassy in Brussels.; Both countries are full members of the European Union and NATO.
Estonia	26 January 1921	Diplomatic relations were established first time on 21 January 1921. Diplomatic relations re-established on 5 September 1991.: Belgium first recognised the independence of Estonia on 26 January 1921.; After the end of the Soviet occupation, Belgium re-recognised Estonia on 27 August 1991.; Belgium is accredited to Estonia from its embassy in Helsinki, Finland.; Estonia has an embassy in Brussels.; Both countries are full members of NATO and of the European Union.; Estonian Ministry of Foreign Affairs about relations with Belgium
Finland	9 July 1919	Diplomatic relations were established on 9 July 1919.: Belgium recognised Finland's independence on 10 June 1919.; Belgium has an embassy in Helsinki.; Finland has an embassy in Brussels.; Both countries are full members of the European Union and NATO.
France	8 March 1831	See Belgium–France relations Diplomatic relations were established on 8 March 1831 when has been accredited Envoy Extraordinary and Minister Plenipotentiary of Belgium to France Comte C. Le Hon.: France helped Belgium rebel against and gain independence from the United Kingdom of the Netherlands. (See: Belgian Revolution); Belgium has an embassy in Paris and consulates-general in Marseille and Strasbourg.; France has an embassy in Brussels.; Both nations signed a trade agreement in 1934.; Both countries are members of NATO and the Francophonie, both are also founding members of the European Union and Council of Europe.
Germany		See Belgium–Germany relations They are both members of the European Union and NATO. Also, the majority of the people in East Belgium (Eupen-Malmedy) speak German.: Belgium has an embassy in Berlin.; Germany has one embassy in Brussels.
Greece	30 November 1838	See Belgium–Greece relations Diplomatic relations were established on 30 November 1838 when has been accredited Chargé d'Affaires of Belgium to Greece M. Benjamin Mary.: Belgium has an embassy in Athens.; Since 1945, Greece has an embassy in Brussels.; Both countries are full members of NATO, of the European Union.; There are between 15,000 and 26,000 Greeks who live in Belgium.
Holy See	21 July 1832	Diplomatic relations were established on 21 July 1832 when has been accredited Envoy Extraordinary and Minister Plenipotentiary of Belgium to Roman states and Italian states (Holy See) Viscount Vilain XIIII.: Belgium has an embassy to the Holy See based in Rome.; Holy See has an apostolic nunciature in Brussels.
Iceland	9 November 1945	Diplomatic relations were established on 9 November 1945.: Belgium is accredited to Iceland from its embassy in Oslo, Norway.; Iceland has an embassy in Brussels.; Both countries are full members of NATO.
Ireland	7 September 1932	Diplomatic relations were established on 7 September 1932 when has been established Legation of Ireland in Belgium (Brussels). It was raised into an embassy 9 January 1959.: Belgium has an embassy in Dublin.; Ireland has an embassy in Brussels.; Both countries are full members of the European Union and the Council of Europe.
Italy	24 February 1851	Diplomatic relations were established on 24 February 1851 when has been appointed Envoy Extraordinary and Minister Plenipotentiary of Italy to Belgium Alberto Lupi Di Montalto.: Belgium has an embassy in Rome.; Italy has an embassy in Brussels.; Both countries are full members of the Organisation for Economic Co-operation and Development, of the European Union and of NATO.; There are around 450,000 people of Italian descent living in Belgium (see Italian Belgians); one of them is former Belgian prime minister Elio Di Rupo; During World War II, Free Belgian Forces participated in the East African Campaign against Italy.
Kosovo	23 April 2008	See Belgium–Kosovo relations Diplomatic relations were established on 23 April 2008.: Belgium recognised Kosovo on 24 February 2008.; Belgium has a Liaison Office in Pristina.; Kosovo has an embassy in Brussels.
Latvia	26 January 1921	Diplomatic relations were established on 26 January 1921. Diplomatic relations re-established on 5 September 1991.: Belgium is accredited to Latvia from its embassy in Stockholm, Sweden.; Latvia has an embassy in Brussels.; Both countries are full members of the European Union and NATO.
Lithuania	27 December 1922	Diplomatic relations were established first time on 27 December 1922.Diplomatic relations re-established on 5 September 1991.: Belgium is accredited to Lithuania from its embassy in Warsaw, Poland.; Lithuania has an embassy in Brussels.; Both countries are full members of the European Union and NATO.
Luxembourg	9 July 1892	See Belgium–Luxembourg relations Diplomatic relations were established on 9 July 1892.: Belgium has an embassy in Luxembourg City.; Luxembourg has an embassy in Brussels.; Both countries are full members of the European Union and NATO.
Malta	June 1965	Diplomatic relations were established in June 1965.: Belgium is accredited to Malta from its embassy in Rome, Italy.; Malta has an embassy in Brussels.; Both countries are full members of the European Union and of the Council of Europe.
Moldova	11 March 1992	Diplomatic relations were established on 11 March 1992.: Belgium recognised Moldova as an independent country effective from 31 December 1991.; Moldova has an embassy in Brussels.; Belgium is accredited to Moldova from its embassy in Bucharest, Romania.
Monaco	2 October 1931	Diplomatic relations were established on 2 October 1931.: Belgium is accredited to Monaco from its embassy in Paris, France and maintains an honorary consulate in Monaco.; Monaco has an embassy in Brussels.
Montenegro	25 July 2006	Diplomatic relations were established on 25 July 2006.: Belgium recognised Montenegro as an independent country on 23 June 2006.; Belgium is accredited to Montenegro from its embassy in Belgrade, Serbia.; Montenegro has an embassy in Brussels.; Both countries are full members of the Council of Europe and NATO.; Belgium is an EU member and Montenegro is an EU candidate.
Netherlands	3 August 1839	See Belgium–Netherlands relations Diplomatic relations were established on 3 August 1839 when has been accredited Envoy Extraordinary and Minister Plenipotentiary of Belgium to the Netherlands Prince J. De Chimay.: Belgium has an embassy in The Hague.; Netherlands has an embassy in Brussels and a consulate-general in Antwerp.; Both nations are members of the European Union and NATO.
North Macedonia	14 February 1994	Diplomatic relations were established on 14 February 1994.: Belgium recognised North Macedonia as an independent country on 12 October 1993.; Belgium is accredited to North Macedonia from its embassy in Sofia, Bulgaria.; North Macedonia has an embassy in Brussels.; Both countries are full members of the Council of Europe and NATO.; Belgium is an EU member and North Macedonia is an EU candidate.
Norway	14 November 1905	Diplomatic relations were established on 14 November 1905.: Belgium has an embassy in Oslo.; Norway has an embassy in Brussels.; Both countries are full members of NATO.
Poland	6 March 1919	See Belgium–Poland relations Diplomatic relations were established on 6 March 1919.: Belgium has an embassy in Warsaw.; Poland has an embassy in Brussels.; Both countries are full members of the European Union and NATO.
Portugal	20 February 1834	See Belgium–Portugal relations Diplomatic relations were established on 20 February 1834 when has been accredited chargé d'affaires of Belgium to Portugal C. Serruys.: Belgium has an embassy in Lisbon.; Portugal has an embassy in Brussels.; Both countries are full members of the European Union and NATO.
Romania	29 March 1880	Diplomatic relations were established on 29 March 1880.: Belgium has an embassy in Bucharest.; Romania has an embassy in Brussels.; Both countries are full members of the European Union and NATO.
Russia	11 April 1853	See Belgium–Russia relations Diplomatic relations were established on 11 April 1853.: Belgium has an embassy in Moscow and a consulate-general in Saint Petersburg.; Russia has an embassy in Brussels.
Serbia	15 March 1886	See Belgium–Serbia relations: Belgium recognised Yugoslavia as an independent country on 22 April 1996.; Belgium has an embassy in Belgrade.; Serbia has an embassy in Brussels.; Belgium is an EU member and Serbia is an EU candidate.
Slovakia	1 January 1993	Diplomatic relations were established on 1 January 1993.: Belgium recognised Slovakia as an independent country on 16 February 1993, effective from 1 January 1993.; Belgium is accredited to Slovakia from its embassy in Vienna, Austria.; Slovakia has an embassy in Brussels.; Both countries are full members of the European Union and NATO.
Slovenia	5 March 1992	Diplomatic relations were established on 5 March 1992. Belgium recognised Slovenia as an independent country effective from 15 January 1992.: Belgium is accredited to Slovenia from its embassy in Vienna, Austria.; Slovenia has an embassy in Brussels.; Both countries are full members of NATO and of the European Union.
Spain	18 September 1832	See Belgium–Spain relations Diplomatic relations were established on 18 September 1832 when has been accredited chargé d'affaires of Belgium to Spain J.-B. Kaufmann.: Belgium has an embassy in Madrid.; Spain has an embassy in Brussels.; Both countries are full members of the European Union and NATO.
Sweden	23 February 1837	Diplomatic relations were established on 23 February 1837 when has been accredited Chargé d'Affaires of Belgium to Sweden baron T. Vander Straten Ponthoz.: Belgium has an embassy in Stockholm.; Sweden is accredited to Belgium from its Ministry of Foreign Affairs in Stockholm.; Both countries are full members of the European Union, NATO and of the Council of Europe.
Ukraine	10 March 1992	See Belgium–Ukraine relations Diplomatic relations were established on 10 March 1992. Although politically the two nations are not closely connected, they have a long history of economic integration and trade, with Belgian investment playing a role in the contemporary Ukrainian economy. As of 2008, trade revenue generated between the two nations accounted for approximately US$1 billion.: Belgium recognised Ukraine as an independent country effective from 31 December 1991.; Belgium has an embassy in Kyiv.; Ukraine has an embassy in Brussels.
United Kingdom	1 December 1830	See Belgium–United Kingdom relations British Prime Minister Rishi Sunak with Belgian Prime Minister Alexander De Croo in 10 Downing Street, January 2024. Belgium established diplomatic relations with the United Kingdom on 1 December 1830.: Belgium maintains an embassy in London.; The United Kingdom is accredited to Belgium through its embassy in Brussels.; Both countries share common membership of the Atlantic Co-operation Pact, the Council of Europe, the European Court of Human Rights, the International Criminal Court, NATO, the OECD, the OSCE, the United Nations, and the World Trade Organization. Bilaterally the two countries have a Classified Information Protection Agreement, a Double Taxation Convention, and a Maritime Cooperation Agreement.

=== Oceania ===
Country	Formal Relations Began	Notes
Australia	10 October 1947	See Australia–Belgium relations Diplomatic relations were established on 10 October 1947.: Australia has an embassy in Brussels.; Belgium has an embassy in Canberra and honorary consulates in Adelaide, Brisbane, Launceston, Melbourne, Perth and Sydney.; There are a number of Australian cemeteries and war memorials (partially) dedicated to Australian soldiers in the Belgian province of West Flanders, being one of the reasons why many Australians still visit Belgium today.; Over 2 dozen Australia–Belgium bilateral treaties cover extradition, trade, taxation, and social security.

== Protocol ==
The kingdom of Belgium recognises 4 types of incoming visits in Belgium. They are ranked in precedence and protocol.

1. The State Visit, formal invitations by the King of the Belgians.
2. The Official Visit, invitation by the Belgian Prime minister.
3. The Working Visit, invitation by an ambassador, the cost is not paid by the Belgian state.
  1. Cordial visits.
  2. Visits of courtoisie
  3. Visits to international Organisations
4. The Private Visit, at own initiative, Belgian authorities only provide security if requested.

== See also ==
- Belgian order of precedence
- List of diplomatic missions in Belgium
- List of diplomatic missions of Belgium
- Visa requirements for Belgian citizens
