= Australia–Belgium relations =

- Australia: Belgium

Australia–Belgium relations are the bilateral relations between Australia and Belgium. Diplomatic relations were established on 10 October 1947. There are a number of Australian cemeteries and war memorials (partially) dedicated to Australian soldiers in the Belgian province of West Flanders, being one of the reasons why many Australians still visit Belgium today. Over 2 dozen Australia–Belgium bilateral treaties cover extradition, trade, taxation, and social security.

== History ==
The two countries established diplomatic relations in 1916 during World War I, when both fought as part of the Allied Powers. Australian forces fought in the Battle of Mesopotamia and the Battle of Passchendaele, in which 12,500 soldiers died. 290,000 Australians fought on the Belgian-French front between 1916 and 1918. They were particularly involved, with numerous soldiers in Belgium, in the Battle of Messines on 7 June 1917, and in the Third Battle of Ypres from 31 July to 6 November 1917. 12,500 Australians were killed during these three years. The graves of half of those killed are unknown.

Australia and Belgium have good bilateral relations. The Belgium–Luxembourg Economic Union is Australia's 11th largest investor. In 2008, the total value of Belgian investments in Australia had risen to 19.5 billion dollars. Belgium and Australia share views on various international policy themes, such as climate change and arms control. Belgium and Australia are partners in the International Security Assistance Force in Afghanistan, and Belgium is a member of the Australia Group on Chemical Weapons. Historically, both countries have also had good ties for a long time, as thousands of Australians fought in Belgium during the World War I.

In October 2020, Princess Astrid of Belgium led an economic mission to Australia.

== Migration ==
During the 2011 Australian census, 5,762 people stated that they were born in Belgium. More than 10,000 declared that they were of Belgian descent.

== Economic relations ==
In 2015, Australian exports to Belgium, mainly coal and other fossil fuels, amounted to approximately 1.2 billion Australian dollars . Imports from Belgium, consisting mainly of pharmaceuticals, passenger cars, and textiles, totaled 1.6 billion AUD in 2015.

Australia is Belgium's 32nd largest export destination and 40th largest import source. Belgium is Australia's 23rd largest export destination and 26th largest import source.

== Resident diplomatic missions ==
- Australia has an embassy in Brussels.
- Belgium has an embassy in Canberra.

== See also ==
- Foreign relations of Belgium
- Foreign relations of Australia
