= Belgium–Indonesia relations =

- Belgium: Indonesia

Diplomatic mission
- Embassy of Belgium, Jakarta: Embassy of Indonesia, Brussels

Belgium and Indonesia established relations on 14 November 1949. Belgium has an embassy in Jakarta and an honorary consulate in Surabaya, and Indonesia has an embassy in Brussels, also accredited to Luxembourg and the European Union.

== History ==
The relations began in 1947 with Belgian involvement in the Commission of Three Nations, together with Australia and the United States, on resolving Indonesia-Dutch disputes regarding the Indonesian sovereignty. Subsequently, Belgium was among the first European nation that recognized Indonesia in 1949. In December 1949 Indonesia established a representative to the Kingdom of Belgium. In 1963, both nations agreed to upgrade the bilateral relations from representative level to the level of embassy. The mission of the Republic of Indonesia to the European Community was established on 18 August 1990 in Brussels.

In 2005, following the Indian Ocean tsunami, Belgium participated in Aceh Monitoring Mission to supervise the implementation of the Helsinki Peace Agreement between Government of Indonesia and Free Aceh Movement. In November 2008, Prince Phillipe of Belgium visited Indonesia to enhance various cooperation with Indonesia.

== Economic relations ==
In 2008, the Belgium—Indonesia total trade value was 1.28 billion Euros. Indonesia main export commodities to Belgium are wood and furniture products, footwear, clothing, textile, leather, pearls, fishery products, tobacco and machinery equipments. Belgium's investment to Indonesia in 2008 was 16,6 million Euro in 2 projects. On the period between 1990 and 2007, Belgium's total investment to Indonesia is worth 263 million Euro in 49 projects, concentrated in plantations, tiles and glass, steel, pharmacy, garment and textile sectors.

== Culture and tourism ==
Belgium is the only country in Europe that possess Indonesian-themed Park, "The Kingdom of Ganesha", first opened on 20 May 2009 by Indonesian Minister of Tourism and Culture Jero Wacik. The park that occupies 6.2 hectares of land is the first Indonesian Park in Europe, located at Pairi Daiza Conservation Park, Brugelette, Belgium. Its collections include Pura Agung Shanti Buwana Balinese Hindu temple, East Nusa Tenggara and Toraja traditional houses and miniature replicas of Borobudur and Prambanan temples. In Indonesia, there is also a street or park named Astrid Avenue, located in the Bogor Botanical Gardens, to honor Queen Astrid of Belgium's visit to the Dutch East Indies (now Indonesia) in 1928.

In August 2009 the Indonesian government has sent a pair of Sumatran elephants to Belgium to enliven the Indonesian Park. According to Indonesian Ambassador to Belgium Nadjib Riphat Kesoema, the elephants are a special gift to commemorate the diplomatic ties between Belgium and Indonesia which have lasted 60 years. It is the first endangered animal breeding loan program that Indonesia ever had in Europe.

To commemorate 65 years of Indonesia-Belgium relations, two stamps depicting cartoon character Tintin in Indonesia's Komodo Island and Kemayoran (Jakarta), were launched in Brussels, in September 2014. These stamps portraying the scenes of Tintin spending time in Indonesia taken from the Flight 714 to Sydney volume of The Adventures of Tintin comics.

== See also ==
- Foreign relations of Belgium
- Foreign relations of Indonesia
