= Russians in Belgium =

There has been a significant community of Russians in Belgium since the 19th century.

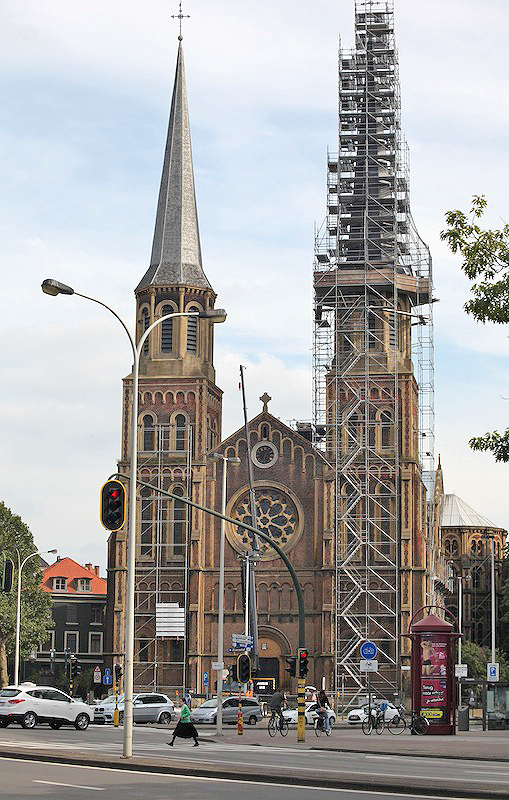
Russian Orthodox Church in Antwerp, was formerly used by Roman Catholics

== Migration history ==
Migration from Russia to Belgium grew in line with increasing commercial relations between the two countries in the late 19th century. By 1910, there were already roughly 7,500 Russians in the country, including many students in universities at Brussels, Ghent, and Liège. The post-Russian Revolution community of Russians in Belgium comprised mostly Russian military personnel. Former Tsarist officers maintained numerous relations with Belgian anti-communist organisations. By 1937, there were already about 8,000 Russians in the country, largely concentrated in Brussels and the Francophone portions of the country. Belgium was the only country whose Russian émigré population increased during the 1930s.

== Numbers ==
As of 2008, official statistics showed 7,176 Russian citizens in Belgium. Another 3,407 Russian citizens obtained Belgian nationality between 1992 and 2007. Overall, 10,244 persons coming from countries of the former USSR obtained Belgian citizenship between 1990 and 2007.

== See also ==
- Russian diaspora
- Belgium–Russia relations
- Demographics of Belgium
- Russians in France
- Russians in Germany
- Russians in the Netherlands

== Bibliography ==
- Coudenys, Wim (2002), "Russian collaboration in Belgium during World War II", Cahiers du monde russe, 43 (2/3), ISSN 1252-6576
- Stols, Eddy (2002), "Exil et migration: refus de mémoire et réalités historiques en Belgique", Matériaux pour l'histoire de notre temps, 67: 41–50, doi:10.3406/mat.2002.402385
