= Belgium–Germany relations =

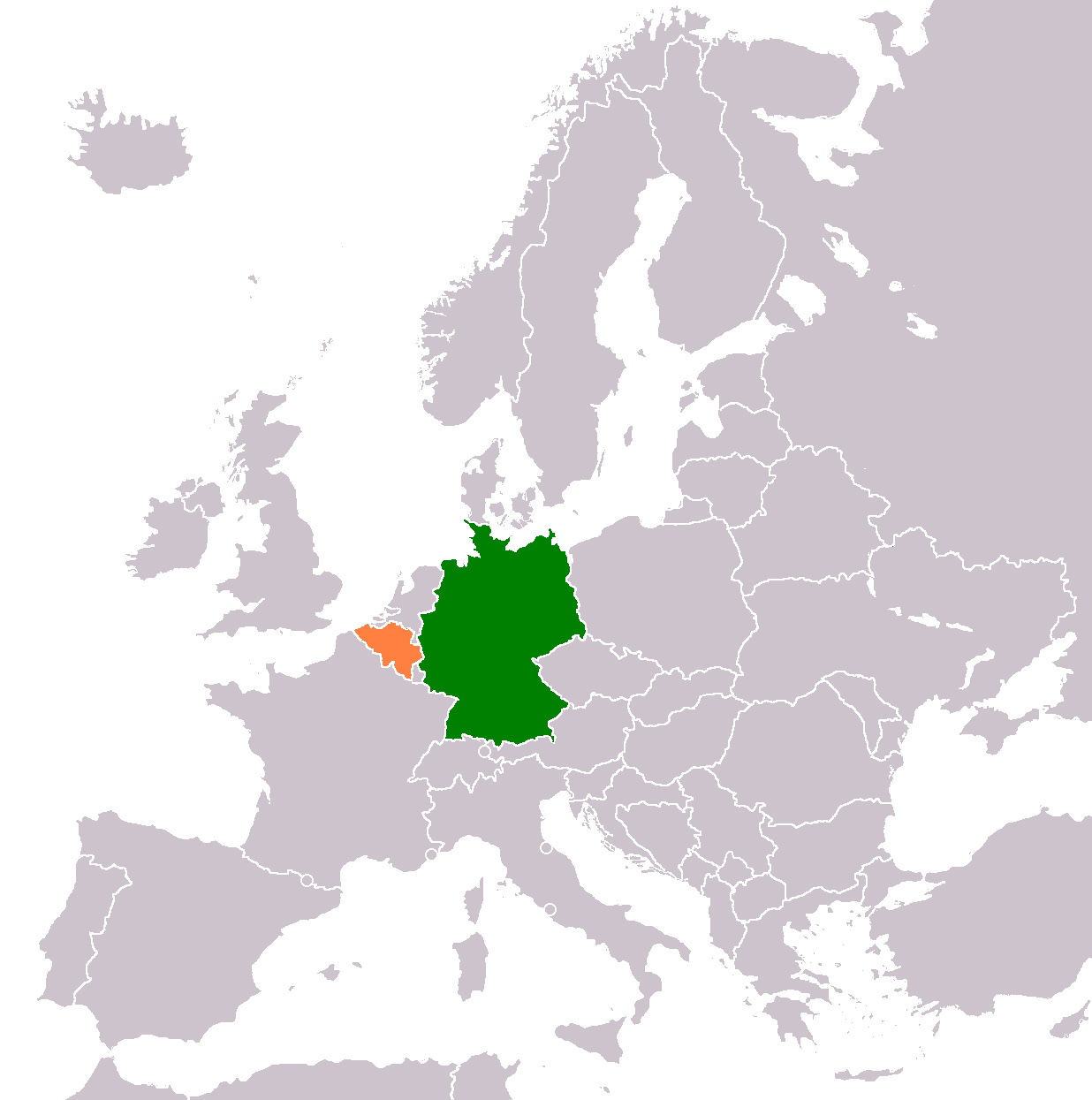

- Germany: Belgium

Belgium and Germany maintain bilateral relations. The two neighbouring countries share a common 204 kilometer long landborder. Both nations are members of the Council of Europe, European Union, NATO and the Eurozone as well as the former colonizers in Africa such as the DR Congo (Belgian Congo) and Rwanda (German East Africa) until the Germans led by the Askari (Schutztruppe) were ousted by the Belgians led by the Force Publique during the First World War as part of campaign in 1916.

Belgium has an embassy in Berlin, and consulates in Cologne, Frankfurt am Main, Munich, Aachen, Hamburg, Stuttgart, and Bremen, while Germany has an embassy in Brussels.

Some German cities (like Hanau and Cologne) are or were traditional centres of Belgian Protestant Diaspora. German is besides Dutch and French also the third official language in Belgium. The German-speaking Community of Belgium is the smallest of the three political communities in Belgium. Belgium has been participating in the annual meeting of German-speaking countries since 2014.

== History ==
The biggest part of modern territory of Belgium, along with the bulk of modern Germany, and other territories, had been part of the Holy Roman Empire for centuries until the end of the 18th century. The first king of Belgium after Belgium gained its independence in 1830 was Leopold I, who hailed from the aristocratic family of Saxe-Coburg and Gotha. To date, all Belgian kings stem from his lineage. Leopold II who became king of the Belgians claimed the territory of the Congo River basin in Central Africa as his private possession, the Congo Free State (later became known as the Belgian Congo) as the city of Léopoldville (present-day Kinshasa) named after himself by the Belgian government. At the Berlin Conference led by the chancellor Otto von Bismarck in 1885, Germany acquired Rwanda, which was then incorporated into German East Africa as the city of Kigali later became a center of German administration within the territory, both the Belgians in Leopoldville and the Germans in Kigali utilized treaties with the native leaders as a formal mechanism to establish colonial, often under the guise of "peace" or protection.

Belgium was invaded and occupied by Germany in the First and Second World Wars, with Belgian civilians being victims of German war crimes (see: Rape of Belgium, Vinkt massacre). The territory currently comprising the German-speaking community in Belgium (known as Eupen-Malmedy) was taken from Germany following World War I and annexed into Belgium's Liège Province, as stipulated the Treaty of Versailles as compensation for the Allied countries. In 1914, German Chancellor Theobald von Bethmann Hollweg formed a plan to establish a Central European Economic Union, comprising a number of European countries, including Germany and Belgium, in which, as he secretly stressed, there was to be a semblance of equality among the member states, but in fact it was to be under German leadership to cement Germany's economic hegemony over Central Europe (see also: Mitteleuropa). In 1916, the Force Publique, under the command of General Charles Tombeur, launched an offensive into German East Africa by forcing the Germans including Askari to retreat, while the Belgians had won a major victory at the Battle of Tabora in September that same year during the East African campaign. Following the war, the German East Africa were awarded to Belgium which became a Class B mandate in 1922. The plan failed amid Germany's defeat in the war which has lost Rwanda to the Belgians under their control. Rwanda was administered by Belgium under a mandate until after World War II, when it became a Trust Territory of the United Nations, following the Liberation of Belgium in 1945. The Congo finally achieved independence from Belgium on 30 June 1960 after the Belgo-Congolese Round Table Conference. With the Rwandan Revolution against King Kigeli V of Rwanda that has already abolished, Rwanda also finally gained independence from Belgium on 1 July 1962 as the "Republic of Rwanda".

== Diaspora ==
Around 56,000 Belgians currently live in Germany, and around 40,000 Germans living in Belgium in 2021.

== Resident diplomatic missions ==
- Belgium has an embassy in Berlin.
- Germany has an embassy in Brussels.
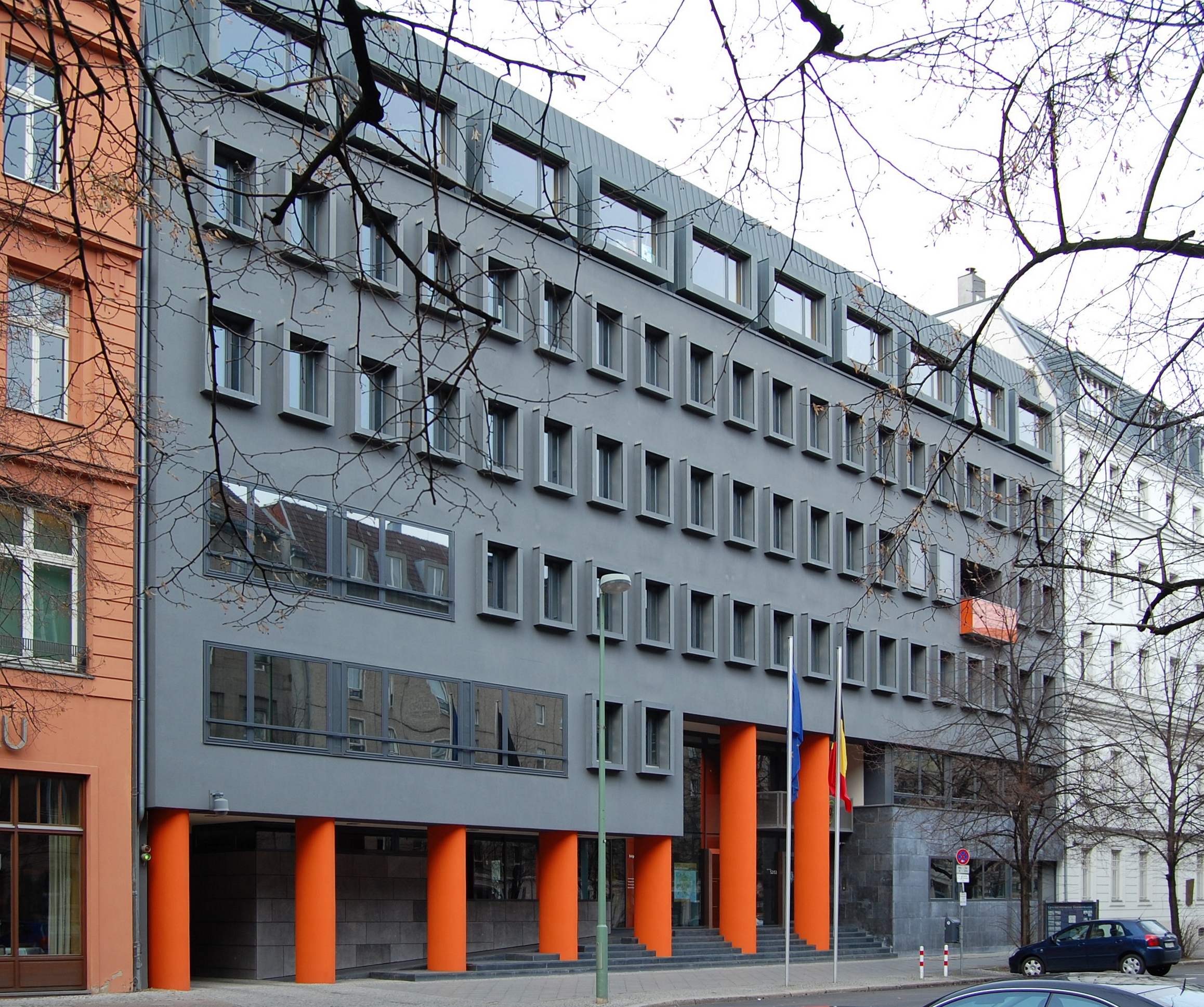
Embassy of Belgium in Berlin

== See also ==
- Foreign relations of Belgium
- Foreign relations of Germany
