= Belgium–Malaysia relations =

Bilateral relations between Belgium and Malaysia

- Belgium: Malaysia

Belgium–Malaysia relations refers to foreign relations between Belgium and Malaysia. Belgium has an embassy in Kuala Lumpur, and Malaysia has an embassy in Brussels.

== Historical relations ==
Diplomatic relations between Malaysia and Belgium were established in 1957, coinciding with Malaysia's independence. The relationship strengthened in 1975 with the opening of Malaysia's Embassy in Brussels, and the appointment of Peter Stephen Lai as the first Ambassador. Over the years, numerous ambassadors have served, with Malaysia’s current ambassador, Mohd Khalid Abbasi Abdul Razak, taking office in October 2023. The embassy, originally located at Avenue Franklin Roosevelt, moved to its current location at Avenue de Tervueren in 1982. Additionally, Malaysia's embassy in Belgium is also accredited to Luxembourg and the European Union.

== Military relations ==
In 1968, Malaysia's Deputy Premier and Defence Minister, Tun Abdul Razak, toured the Belgian Navy mine school.

On 24 August 2017, Malaysia launched its first-ever regional centre for Military and International Humanitarian Law at the National Defence University of Malaysia in Kuala Lumpur. A memorandum of understanding was signed between the ICRC and NDUM to solidify the partnership. The centre was expected to host workshops, seminars, and conferences to enhance understanding and compliance with IHL in the region.

On December 8, 2024, during the visit of French Minister for Armed Forces, Sebastien Lecornu, France and Malaysia agreed to resume the Malaysia-France Defence Joint High Strategic Committee meeting, which had its first session on January 24, 2024, in Kuala Lumpur. The meeting focused on military cooperation, leading to the signing of a bilateral roadmap for enhanced strategic and military collaboration. The French delegation also visited the Subang Air Base, where discussions on air cooperation and missions like MALFRENCH DAGGERT (October 2023) and PEGASUS 23 (June 2023) took place. France also emphasized the importance of defense cooperation with Malaysia, particularly in military-to-military relations and defense technology.

== Political relations ==
On March 18, 2022, the Belgian honorary consulate office was opened in Penang.

On 19 January 2025, Malaysian Prime Minister Anwar Ibrahim visited Belgium for a two-day working trip. During his visit, he attended a gathering with around 200 members of the Malaysian diaspora in Belgium.

== Economic relations ==
In 2000, a trade mission from Wallonia, was interested in joint-venture partners with Malaysian industry. Silvana Flagothier, the head of the delegation said: "We are convinced that Malaysia is a very good base to establish representative office and joint-venture". In 2001, the Malaysian Association of Belgium and Luxembourg was formed by the Embassy of Malaysia in Brussels. In 2002, Malaysian Minister of International Trade and Industry Rafidah Aziz said Belgium could serve as a "gateway for Malaysian companies venturing into the European market, while Malaysia can serve as the competitive springboard for Belgian companies entering the East Asian markets". In 2006 Essensium NV, a computer chip manufacturer raised US$7.1 million from Atlantic Quantum Sdn. Bhd. of Malaysia. In 2007, Vanbreda International of Belgium chose Malaysia as its global operations centre.

In 2016, Malaysia ranked 11th among the biggest buyers of Belgian potatoes with a spending of RM306 million (€64.5 million) on 65,718 tonnes of imported potato fries, of which 9,689 tonnes were from Belgium. There is also a Malaysia Belgium Luxembourg Business Council.

== Resident diplomatic missions ==
- Belgium has an embassy in Kuala Lumpur.
- Malaysia has an embassy in Brussels.

== See also ==
- Foreign relations of Belgium
- Foreign relations of Malaysia
- Malaysia–European Union relations
