= Belgium–Spain relations =

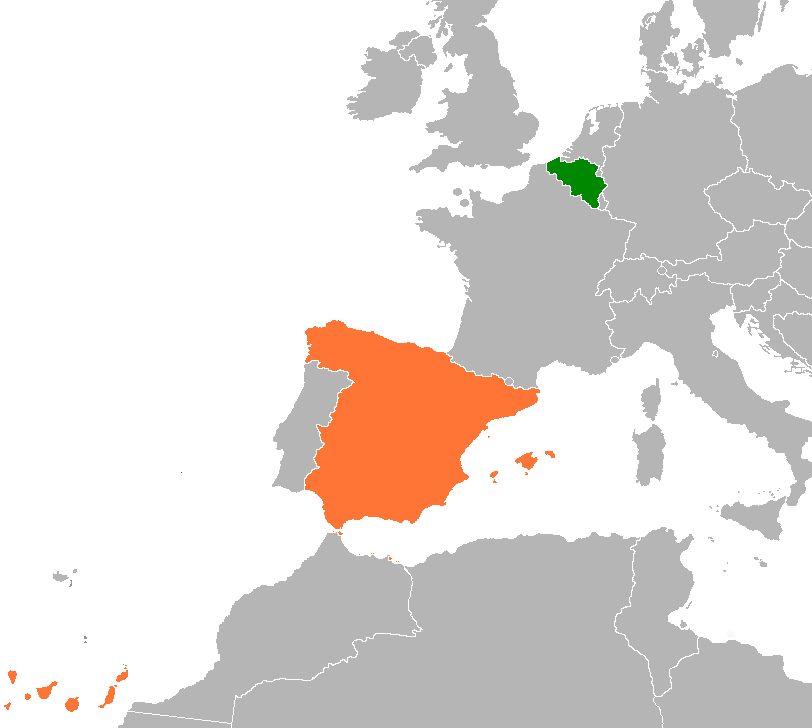
- Belgium: Spain

Belgium and Spain maintain bilateral relations. Belgium has an embassy in Madrid and four consulates general in: Madrid, Barcelona, Santa Cruz de Tenerife and Alicante. Spain has an embassy and a consulate in Brussels. The relations between both countries are defined mainly by their membership in the European Union and by being allies in NATO, as well as belonging to numerous international organizations, which makes their relations have ample development in the framework of them.

== History ==
In 1516, Charles V, sovereign of the Netherlands, accepted the Crowns of Aragon and Castile, and agreed to be Carlos I of Spain. The Spanish history with Flanders and Wallonia came together to maintain a very close relationship throughout the centuries.

Charles I was born sixteen years earlier in the city of Ghent. In Brussels the Palace of Carlos V was built, today recovered in an important archaeological site. Numerous Spanish merchants had already traveled to Flanders before and had formed in Bruges an important community. In fact 1330 a consulate is created especially for them, and today two hotels refer to those times: Hotel Navarra and Hotel Aragón. The merchants were joined by the soldiers of Carlos I. Many of them stayed and now there are families in Belgium of clear Spanish descent: the Ayala, the Béjar, the Perez, the Manrique, etc.

== Diplomatic relations ==
Spain and Belgium maintain diplomatic relations from the first moment of Belgian independence in the 19th century. Until the end of World War I, the Spanish representation was in charge of a "Plenipotentiary Minister". From that moment the Marquis of Villalobar was elevated to the rank of Ambassador. Relations between Spain and Belgium, traditionally good, did not present any significant dispute.

After World War II, Francisco Franco refused to extradite Léon Degrelle, sentenced "in absentia" for collaboration with the Nazi occupation.

In 1960, King Baudouin of Belgium married the Spanish Fabiola de Mora y Aragón, which meant that between 1960 and 1993 Belgium had a Spanish queen consort.

=== Separatism movements in Catalonia and Flanders ===
Due to the influence of Flemish separatism in Belgian politics, in legal matters there is disparity of criteria between the two countries. The Belgian justice system has refused on several occasions to deliver ETA members accused of terrorism to the Spanish justice system. An example is the case of Natividad Jaúregui, in which Belgium was condemned by the European Court of Human Rights.

In November 2017, the president of the Generalitat de Catalunya, Carles Puigdemont, appears in Belgium after leaving Spanish territory together with a group of faithful consellers. Puigdemont had been dismissed by the Spanish Government, which had applied the article 155 of the Spanish Constitution, revoking Catalan autonomy and assuming the control of the same. Spanish justice began the process to extradite the president dismissed for crimes of sedition, having declared the independence of part of Spanish territory. The defenders of Puigdemont defended that justice had been done by giving voice to the Catalan people. These were joined by the Flemish pro-independence right-wing and far-right, who saw in the Catalan independence movement a reflection of their own. The Belgian government refused to officially support Carles Puigdemont on understanding that it was an internal Spanish matter, but by not having tacitly supported the Madrid government it served to initiate a diplomatic crisis with the central government of Spain. On 14 December, the Audiencia Nacional withdrew the euro-order to arrest Puigdemont and the escaped consellers, for which the Belgian justice filed the necessary procedures for his extradition.

In 2021, after the Belgian justice rejected the extradition of rapper Valtònyc, accused of inciting terrorism, the European Commission has warned that Belgium is becoming a sanctuary for those who have fled from Spanish justice, with which the problem does not reside in Spain, but in the Belgian courts which could be in breach of European regulations, in addition to being biased.

In 2022, the European Commission backed the Spanish Supreme Court in the conflict with Belgium about the euro-orders of "procés", stating before the CJEU that "there is no systemic problem regarding the rule of law in Spain" and that the Belgian authorities cannot add requirements not contemplated in the European regulations on deliveries.

== Business relations ==
Within the framework of bilateral investments, Belgium ranks 16th in the ranking of countries by investor position in Spain (Belgium as the last country of investment) with a total investment stock, without taking into account the entities holding foreign securities. (NO ETVE), of €2,668 M in 2013 (0.90% of the total, latest data available) and the 20th position in the list of countries by investment position of Spain abroad, with a stock of total investment (NO ETVE) of €3,674 million in 2013 (1.12% of the total, latest data available).

== Resident diplomatic missions ==
- Belgium has an embassy in Madrid.
- Spain has an embassy in Brussels.
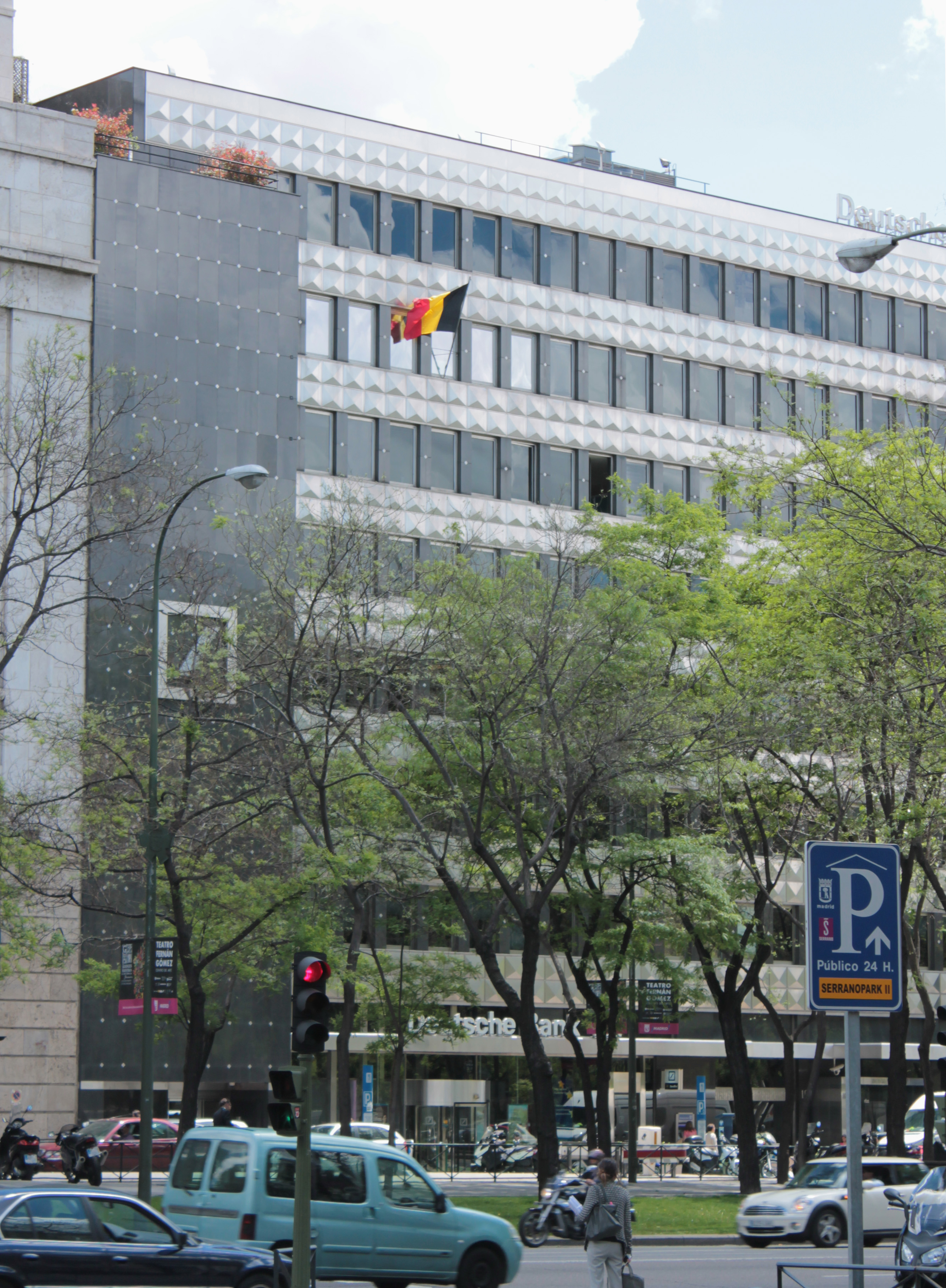
Embassy of Belgium in Madrid

== See also ==
- Foreign relations of Belgium
- Foreign relations of Spain
- NATO-EU relations
