= Belgium–Denmark relations =

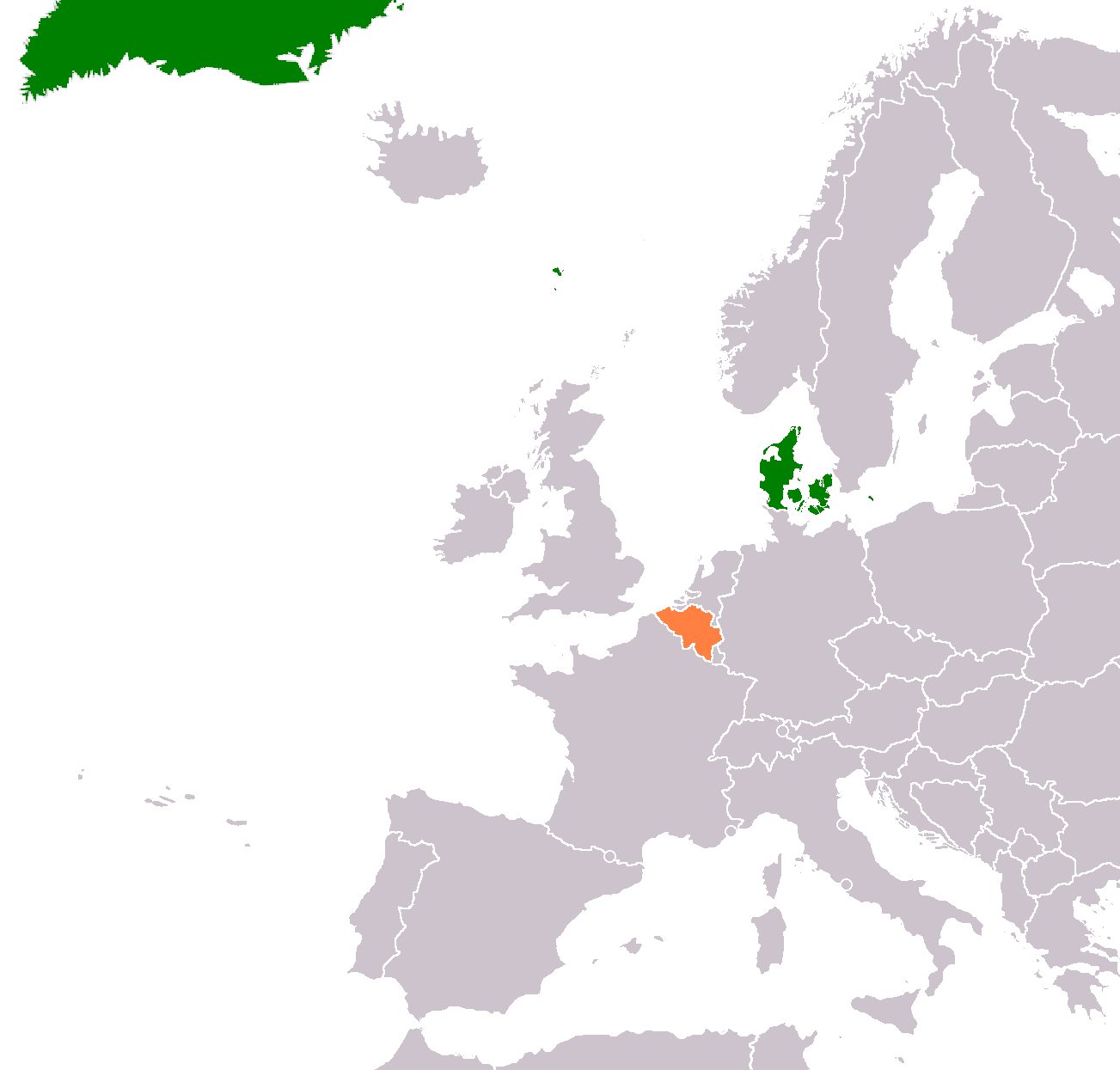
- Denmark: Belgium

Belgium and Denmark maintain current and historical relations. Belgium has an embassy in Copenhagen, while Denmark has an embassy in Brussels. Both countries are members of the European Union and NATO.

Diplomatic relations were established on 25 February 1837 and are described as "excellent".

== History ==
=== Early links (820–948) ===
Links between the two countries date back to before the Viking Age. Neither Belgium or Denmark had a settled population but both areas were used for transit and passage as staging posts along the mercantile routes from the Somme to the North Sea. During the 9th century, the Vikings began raiding Belgium. The first attempt to gain a foothold on the Belgian coast was in 820 but the Vikings only had thirteen drakkars and the attack was unsuccessful. Another attempt was made in 833, when a Viking fleet sacked Friesland, Dorestad, Utrecht and the following year Meuse, Rhine and Scheldt estuaries fell to the Vikings and Duura seaport was sacked and burned in 834, 835 and 836. In 836, the Vikings then sacked and burned the port of Antwerp before raiding France from 840 on. In the subsequent forty years, Belgium was rendered vulnerable by the Danes and was constantly invaded by the Vikings who sacked and ruined its monasteries and estates. As Flanders was closest to the sea and the three estuaries it was the region hit hardest. Flanders experienced attacks in 850, 851, 852, 859, 860, 861, 862, 864, 879 and 880 before the Vikings changed their target to the fertile Meuse basin in 881 and 882 as they had stripped the Scheldt of all its wealth. After being handed Friesland by the Charles the Fat in exchange of never returning to his domains, the Vikings went westward and began raiding Flanders, Brabant and Hainaut. From their stronghold in Rupel, the Vikings attacked Leuven on multiple occasions. The resistance was led by Dukes, Counts and other local officials and the victory of Arnulf of Carinthia in Leuven in October 891 exhausted the Vikings enough to make them retreat from Belgium. In 948, Arnulf I and Adelolf of the County of Flanders drove the Vikings out of Montreuil near the river Canche.

=== Relations after the Viking era (11th century) ===
King of Denmark Canute IV of Denmark (r. 1080–1086) married Adela of Flanders, daughter of Robert I and he reasserted the rights of Denmark over England and in concert with the Count of Flanders and Olaf III of Norway prepared for the invasion of the island but a rebellion among his nobles at Aggersborg prevented the realization of such an invasion. King Canute had to flee and was ultimately killed and his wife Adela returned to Flanders with their son Charles who would become Count Charles the Good of Flanders. Count Charles was killed and is still buried in Bruges.

=== Belgian influence in Denmark (16–17th century) ===
In June 1521, Christian II visited Brussels where he was received by his brother-in-law Charles V. During his trip, he also had his portrait painted by Flemish painter Quentin Matsys. The visit to the Low Countries had a large impact on the administrative and legislative reforms of Christian II back in Denmark. With support from the Low Countries, Denmark aspired to supplant the Hanseatic League in controlling European trade. The Danish King then had around two hundred people from predominantly Nieuwpoort and Mechelen settle in southern Amager near Copenhagen (Hollænderbyen) to grow vegetables.

Throughout the 16th century and during the reign of Christian IV, Danish kings secured the services of artists and architects from Belgium, including Cornelis Floris de Vriendt, Hans van Steenwinckel the Elder and Thomas Quellinus. These Belgians would introduced Dutch Renaissance and Baroque to Denmark.

In regards to music, the Burgundian School was highly appreciated in Denmark and composers as Josquin des Prez and Orlande de Lassus had pupils and emulators in the chapels of the Danish kings.

=== Spanish, Austrian and French Belgium (1556–1804) ===
Following the reign of Charles V, Belgium ceased to exist and became known as Spanish Netherlands and later Austrian Netherlands. Although forgotten by its own Austrian and Spanish masters, Belgium was adored by the Danish writer Ludvig Holberg who wrote that if he had to live outside Denmark he would live in Brabrant or Brussels. After the tidal wave of 1634 which destroyed the island of Pellworm, Frederick III awarded contracts to Dutch and Flemish dyke-builders and over three hundred workers went to the area and settled in Nordstrand where a church was built for the spiritual needs of the workers.

In 1792, Belgium was annexed by France. In 1797, M.J.F. de Bie became consular agent of Denmark in Antwerp, while Christopher Düring succeeded him in 1808 as the first consul of Denmark in Antwerp. Düring was consul until 1833.

=== Early relations between Independent Belgium and Denmark (1837–1928) ===
Diplomatic relations between Belgium and Denmark were established on 25 February 1837 when Belgian Foreign Minister Barthélémy de Theux de Meylandt appointed Baron R. van der Straten – Ponthoz as consul to Copenhagen. On 30 August 1837, the Danish king appointed Chamberlain, Baron C. de Coopmans as consul general in Belgium.

A treaty of trade and shipping was signed between the two countries on 18 June 1895 and Christian X and his wife Alexandrine of Mecklenburg-Schwerin visited Belgium some weeks before World War I, where they were received by King Albert I. An agreement on aerial navigation was signed on 28 June 1923 and King Albert with his wife Elisabeth of Bavaria visited Denmark on a state visit in 1928.

=== Modern relations (since 1949) ===
During the Nazi occupation of Belgium from May 1940 on, the representation of Belgium in Copenhagen was suppressed and diplomatic relations were suspended.

Both members are founding members of NATO as they both joined the organization on 4 April 1949. On 5 May 1949, both countries became founding members of the Council of Europe. The two countries exchanged ambassadors in 1956 and a cultural cooperation agreement was signed in 1958.

To strengthen the cordial relations between the two countries, King Baudouin of Belgium visited Denmark from 8 to 10 September 1966, a visit where he emphasised on the common suffering during World War II. The subsequent year, in June 1967, the Belgian King attended the wedding of Princess Margrethe and Prince Henrik while King Frederik IX Queen Ingrid visited Brussels in June 1968. During the visit, they expressed their hope in Belgian support in the Danish accession to the European Economic Community. On 15 October 1969, the Crown Princess and Prince Henrik visited Belgium again for "Danish Days" and Baudouin of Belgium paid a visit to Denmark in January 1972 for the funeral of Frederik IX. In 1976, the now Queen Margrethe II with Prince Henrik visited Belgium on a state visit. In 1993, the Danish Queen travelled to Belgium for the funeral of King Baudouin. Albert II, successor of Baudouin, visited Denmark in 1995 on a state visit. King Philippe of Belgium visited Denmark in 2015, 2017 and 2021.

== Trade ==
=== Trade (1900s–1940s) ===
From the 1900s to the 1930s, Denmark imported mainly industrial products and coal from Belgium, while Belgium mainly imported dairy products and meat from Denmark. World War I ceased trade between the two countries but it picked up again in 1921. As Belgium underwent reconstruction after the war, Danish imports exploded which the Great Depression impacted. In 1930, Belgium, the Netherlands and the Scandinavian countries met in Antwerp to sign an agreement on "keeping the trade between them as high as possible". However, by 1933, both countries put forward protectionist policies to secure their economies. Between 1900 and 1910, Danish companies were selling butter, beer and canned foods to Belgian Congo. In 1911, Danish exports to Belgian Congo amounted to 0.8% of the total imports to Congo. In the late 1940s, a trade agreement was signed and trade between the two countries increased again albeit constraints due to the customs union Benelux among other things.

=== Trade numbers (1988–2020) ===
The following table shows the annual trade numbers between the two countries from 1998 to 2020 in euro:

Year	Belgian imports to Denmark	Danish imports to Belgium
1988	€761.18 million	€485.71 million
1990	€847.66 million	€612.83 million
1992	€877.81 million	€662.12 million
1994	€1116.45 million	€598.52 million
1996	€1230.4 million	€714.03 million
1998	€1483.14 million	€743.58 million
2000	€1562.92 million	€702.38 million
2002	€1856.27 million	€784.79 million
2004	€1856.06 million	€861.32 million
2006	€2255.07 million	€905.03 million
2008	€2557.72 million	€1006.36 million
2010	€2065.17 million	€896 million
2012	€2154.42 million	€1030.46 million
2014	€2248.62 million	€1242.56 million
2016	€2524.48 million	€1300.18 million
2018	€2518.82 million	€1536.87 million
2020	€2900.54 million	€1469.83 million

== Resident diplomatic missions ==
- Belgium has an embassy in Copenhagen.
- Denmark has an embassy in Brussels.
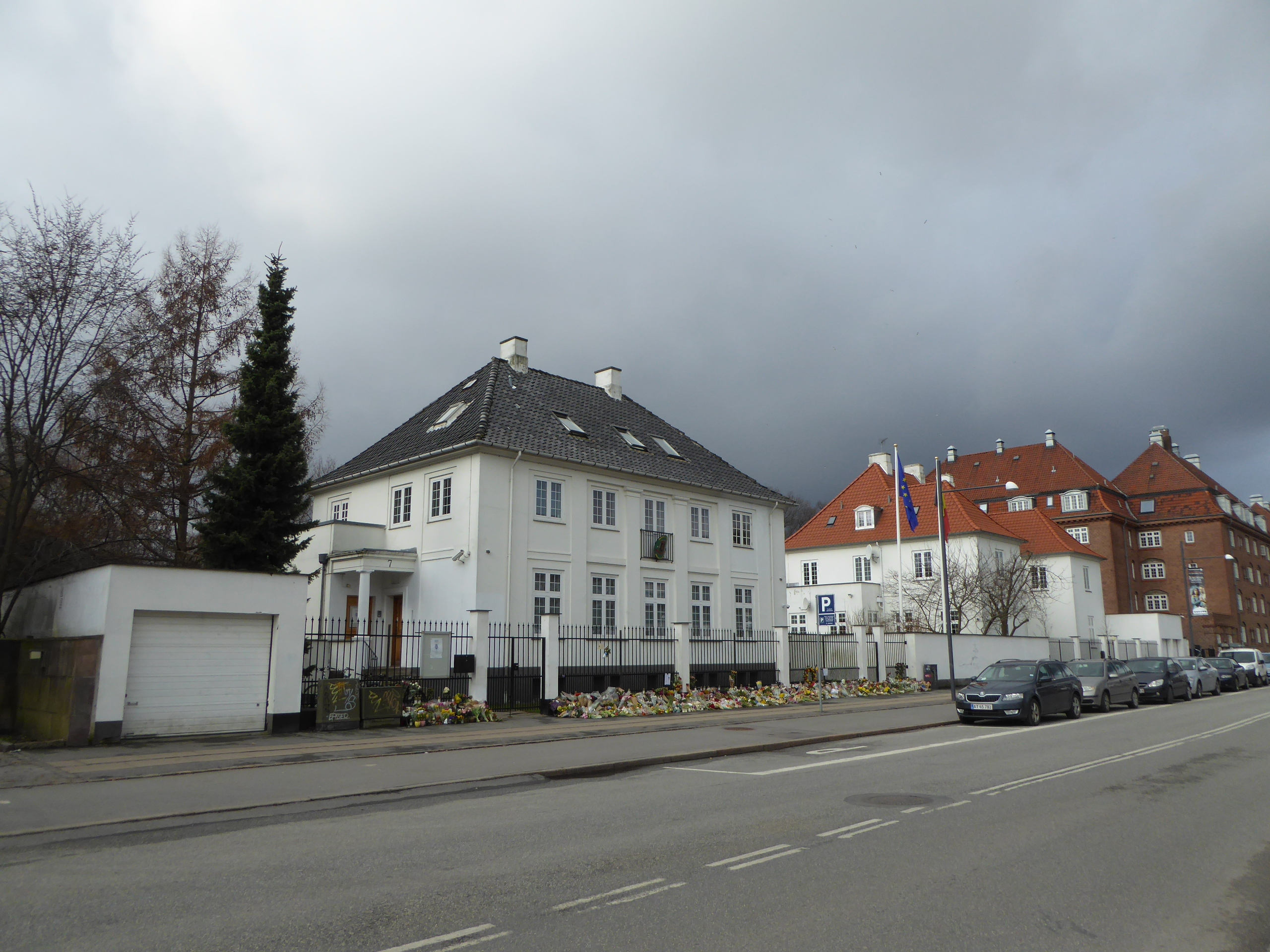
Embassy of Belgium in Copenhagen

== See also ==
- Foreign relations of Belgium
- Foreign relations of Denmark
