= Belgium–Serbia relations =

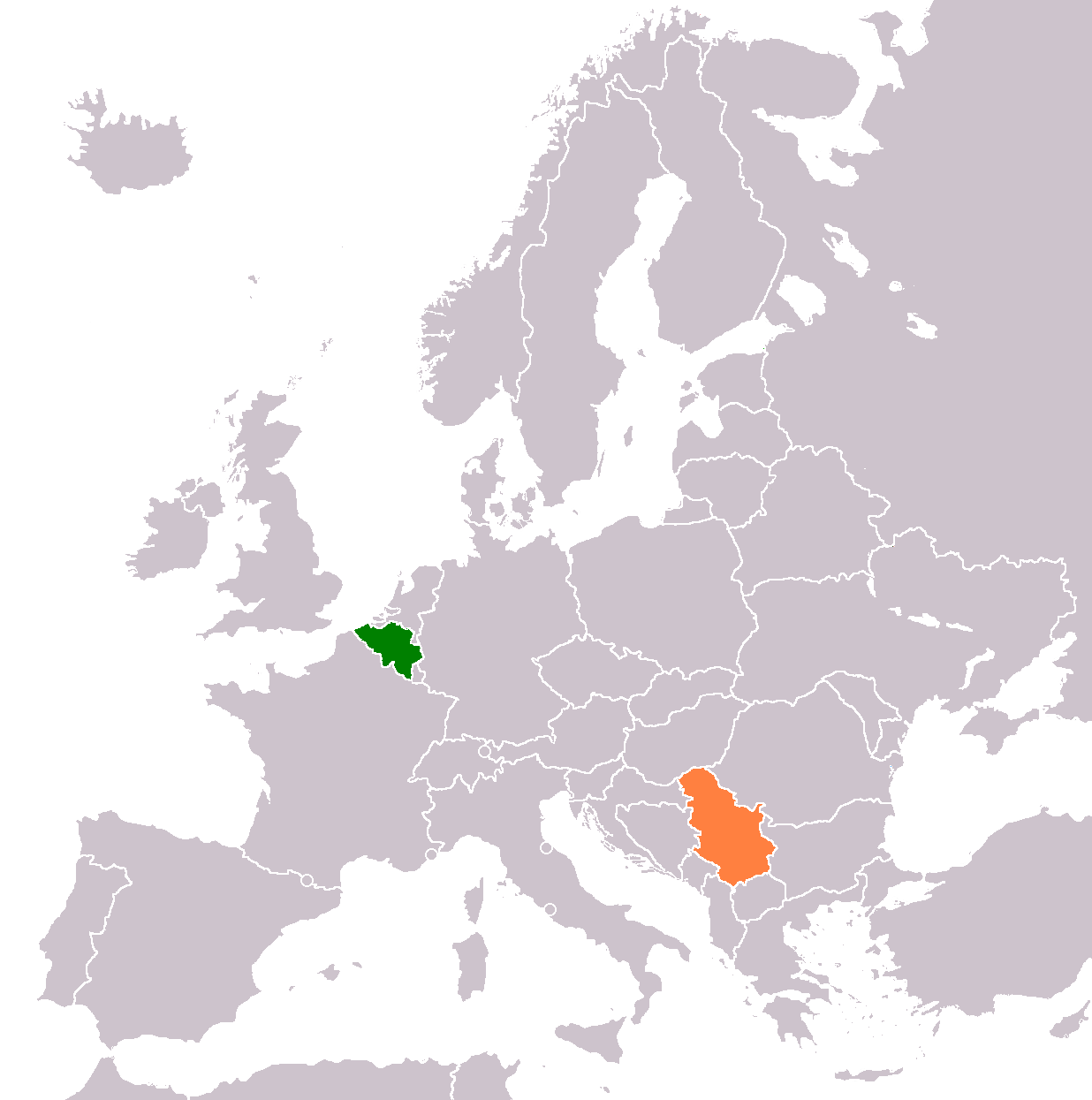
- Belgium: Serbia

Belgium and Serbia maintain diplomatic relations established in 1886. From 1918 to 2006, Belgium maintained relations with the Kingdom of Yugoslavia, the Socialist Federal Republic of Yugoslavia (SFRY), and the Federal Republic of Yugoslavia (FRY) (later Serbia and Montenegro), of which Serbia is considered shared (SFRY) or sole (FRY) legal successor.

== Economic relations ==
Trade between two countries amounted to over $1 billion in 2023; Belgium merchandise exports to Serbia were standing at roughly $738 million; Serbia's export to Belgium were about $316 million.

Major Belgian company present in Serbia is Ravago (plastic producing plant in Mali Iđoš), Somnis Bedding (mattresses manufacturing plant in Novi Bečej), and Jaga (air-conditioners manufacturing plant in Kragujevac). Also, the largest retail company in Serbia is Delhaize Serbia, which is owned by Dutch-Belgian multinational retail and wholesale holding company Ahold Delhaize.

== Resident diplomatic missions ==
- Belgium has an embassy in Belgrade.
- Serbia has an embassy in Brussels.
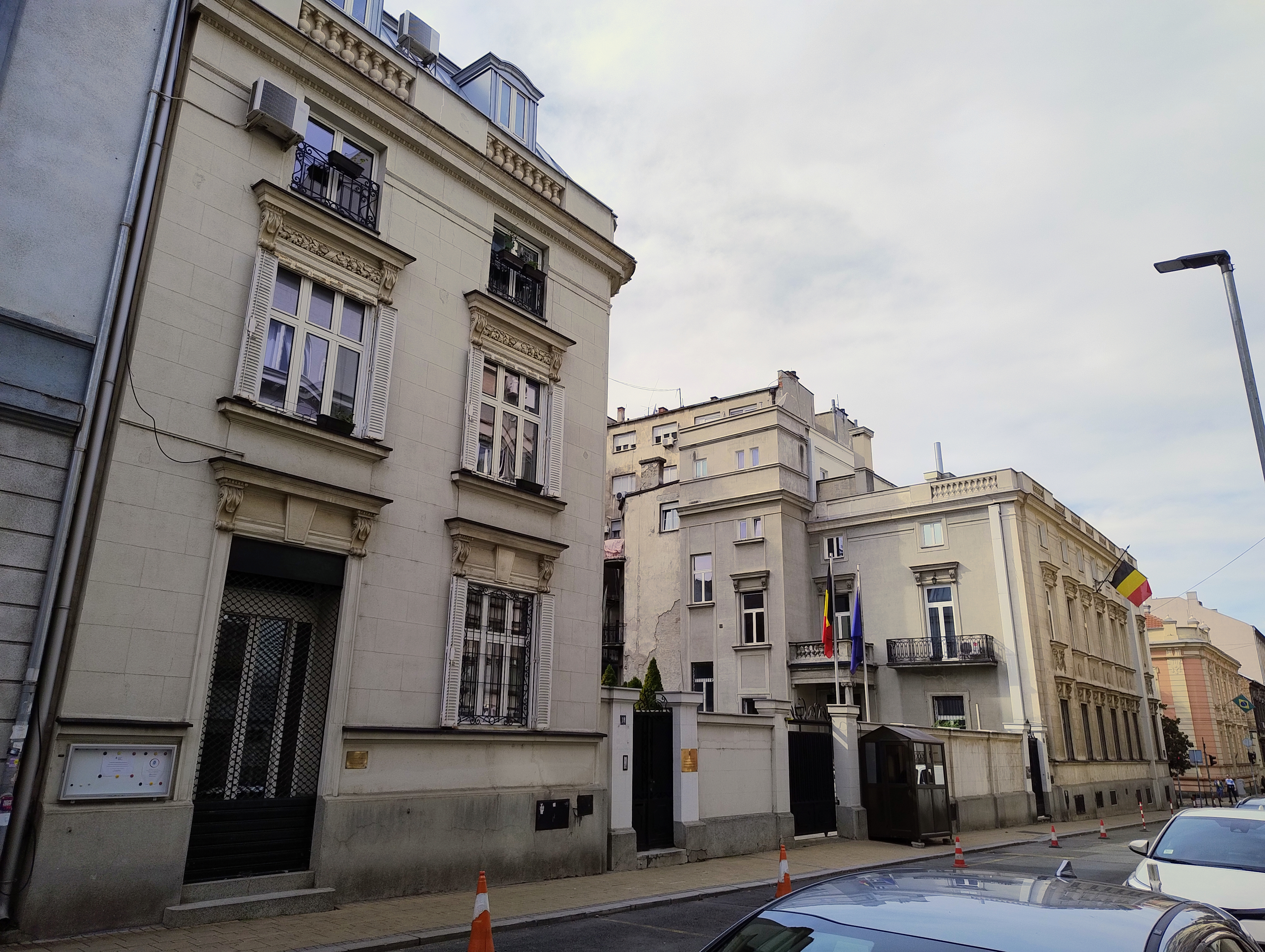
Embassy of Belgium in Belgrade

== See also ==
- Foreign relations of Belgium
- Foreign relations of Serbia
- Belgium–Yugoslavia relations
