= Belgium–Yugoslavia relations =

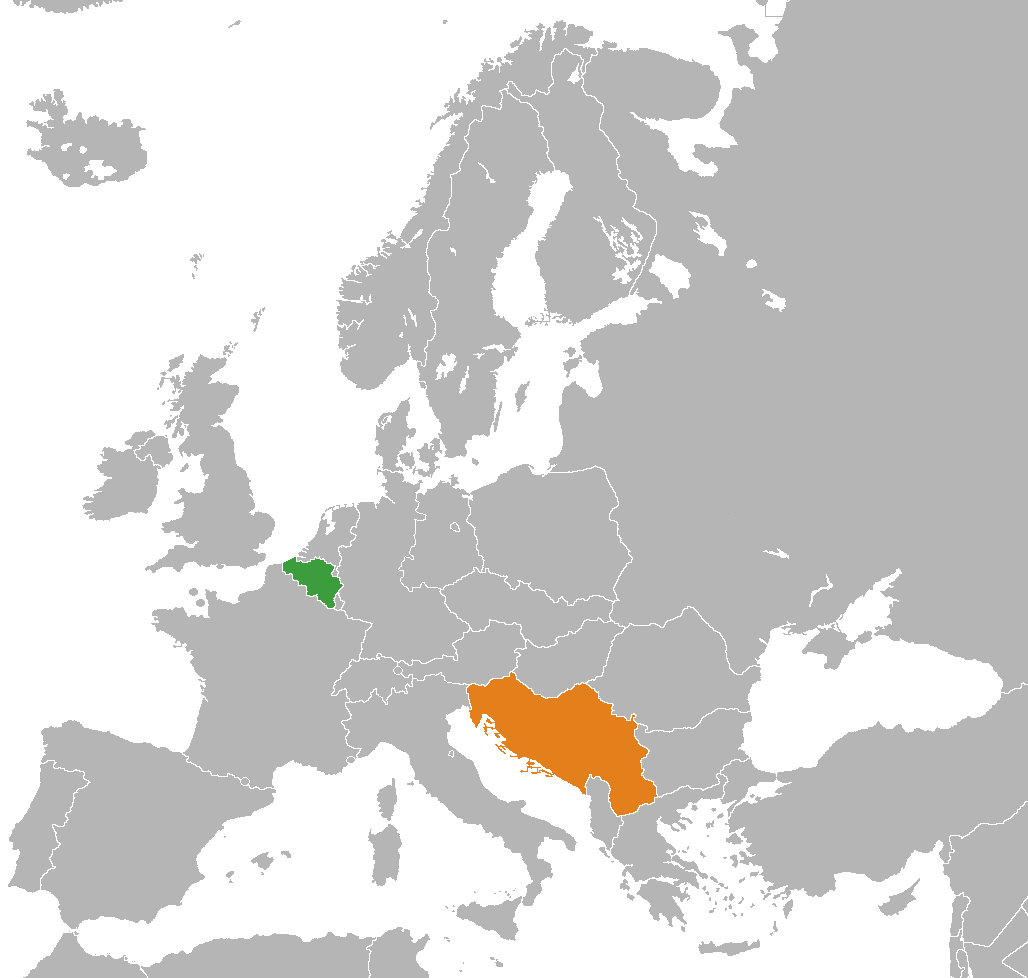

- Belgium: Yugoslavia

Belgium–Yugoslavia relations were historical foreign relations between Belgium and now split-up Yugoslavia (both Kingdom of Yugoslavia or Socialist Federal Republic of Yugoslavia). During the time of Yugoslav existence both countries were European multicultural societies and both implemented federalization reforms in the 1970s with the beginning of the state reform in Belgium and adoption of the 1974 Yugoslav Constitution.

Following the breakup of Yugoslavia and Yugoslav Wars Belgian judges Chris van den Wyngaert and Guy Delvoie served at the International Criminal Tribunal for the former Yugoslavia. During the Yugoslav crisis Belgium significantly contributed to the United Nations peacekeeping efforts in Eastern Slavonia, multicultural easternmost part of Croatia.

== History ==
In the period of decline and dissolution of the Ottoman Empire Belgium established formal bilateral relations with the Kingdom of Serbia, the core predecessor of the Kingdom of Yugoslavia, in 1886.

After the 1948 Tito-Stalin split Belgium realigned its policy and supported Belgrade together with other West Bloc countries. In 1950 Belgian Finance Minister Libaert agreed with American proposed International Bank for Reconstruction and Development credit for Yugoslavia in which Belgium participated with Belgian franc equivalent of 1.8 million dollars. In 1954 two countries signed a convention on issues of social insurance. Relations between the two countries were for some time affected by the Congo Crisis. Following the execution of Patrice Lumumba, Congo's first democratically elected prime minister, demonstrations started in Yugoslav capital Belgrade which escalated in ransacking of the Belgian Embassy.

Minister of Foreign Affairs of Yugoslavia Marko Nikezić visited Belgium in April 1967. Pierre Harmel in return visited Yugoslavia in 1970. Between 6 and 9 October 1970 President of Yugoslavia Josip Broz Tito visited Belgium, where he discussed bilateral relations, trade, Non-aligned conference, European security cooperation and the situation in the Middle East.

In early 1970's Belgium and Yugoslavia signed a set of conventions on extradition and legal assistance (1971), legal assistance in civil and commercial matters (1971), birth certificates and exemption from legalization procedures (1971), recognition and enforcement of court decisions on alimentation (1973). Belgian Prince Albert visited Yugoslavia together with the Minister of Foreign Trade between 15 and 18 September 1971. In 1980 two countries signed agreement on the avoidance of double taxation.

== See also ==
- Belgium–Serbia relations
- Yugoslavia–European Communities relations
- Group of Nine
- Belgium at the 1984 Winter Olympics
- Yugoslavia in the Eurovision Song Contest 1987
- Belgium in the Eurovision Song Contest 1990
- Croats of Belgium

== Sources ==
- Milutin Tomanović, ed. (1971). Hronika međunarodnih događaja 1970 [The Chronicle of International Events in 1970] (in Serbo-Croatian). Belgrade: Institute of International Politics and Economics.
