= Belgium–Kazakhstan relations =

- Belgium: Kazakhstan

Belgium recognized the state sovereignty of Kazakhstan on 31 December 1991. Diplomatic relations were formally established on 25 August 1992.

The Embassy of Kazakhstan in Belgium was opened on 15 April 1993, while the Embassy of Belgium in Kazakhstan began operations in January 2006.

== History ==
Since the establishment of diplomatic relations, the first President of Kazakhstan, Nursultan Nazarbayev, paid nine official and working visits to Belgium, in 1993, 2000, 2002, 2006, twice in 2010, as well as in 2014, 2016, and 2018. During Nazarbayev's presidency, Kazakhstan was visited by the Prime Minister of Belgium Jean-Luc Dehaene in 1998, and by the Crown Prince of Belgium Philippe in 2002, 2009, and 2010.

In December 2006, during a meeting with King Albert II, President Nazarbayev was awarded Belgium's highest state decoration — the Grand Cordon of the Order of Leopold I with the Breast Star of the Grand Cross, an honor conferred upon distinguished statesmen of Belgium and foreign countries.

During President Nazarbayev's official visit to Belgium in October 2010, bilateral meetings were held with King Albert II and Belgian Prime Minister Yves Leterme. The visit also included the inauguration ceremony of a monument dedicated to the victims of nuclear testing, created by Kazakh sculptors based on the “Stronger than Death” memorial in the city of Semey. The monument was subsequently installed in Ypres, a city known for its memorials to the victims of the First and Second World Wars.

At the OSCE Summit held in Astana in December 2010, the Belgian delegation was headed by Prime Minister Yves Leterme.

On 8–9 October 2014, during a working visit to Brussels at the invitation of the President of the European Commission, José Manuel Barroso, President Nazarbayev met with King Philippe of Belgium. The discussions focused on bilateral cooperation, including in the nuclear energy sector, as well as on current international issues.

A further working visit by Nursultan Nazarbayev to Brussels took place on 29–30 March 2016. During the visit, he met with the Presidents of the European Council and the European Commission. Upon arrival in the Belgian capital, Nazarbayev laid flowers at the entrance to Maalbeek metro station in memory of the victims of the terrorist attacks in Brussels on 22 March 2016. As part of the ceremony, he also held a conversation with Guy Vanhengel, a minister of the Government of the Brussels-Capital Region.

== Resident diplomatic missions ==
- Belgium has an embassy in Astana, and consulate in Aktau
- Kazakhstan has an embassy in Brussels.

== See also ==
- Foreign relations of Belgium
- Foreign relations of Kazakhstan
