= Belgium–Syria relations =

Bilateral relations

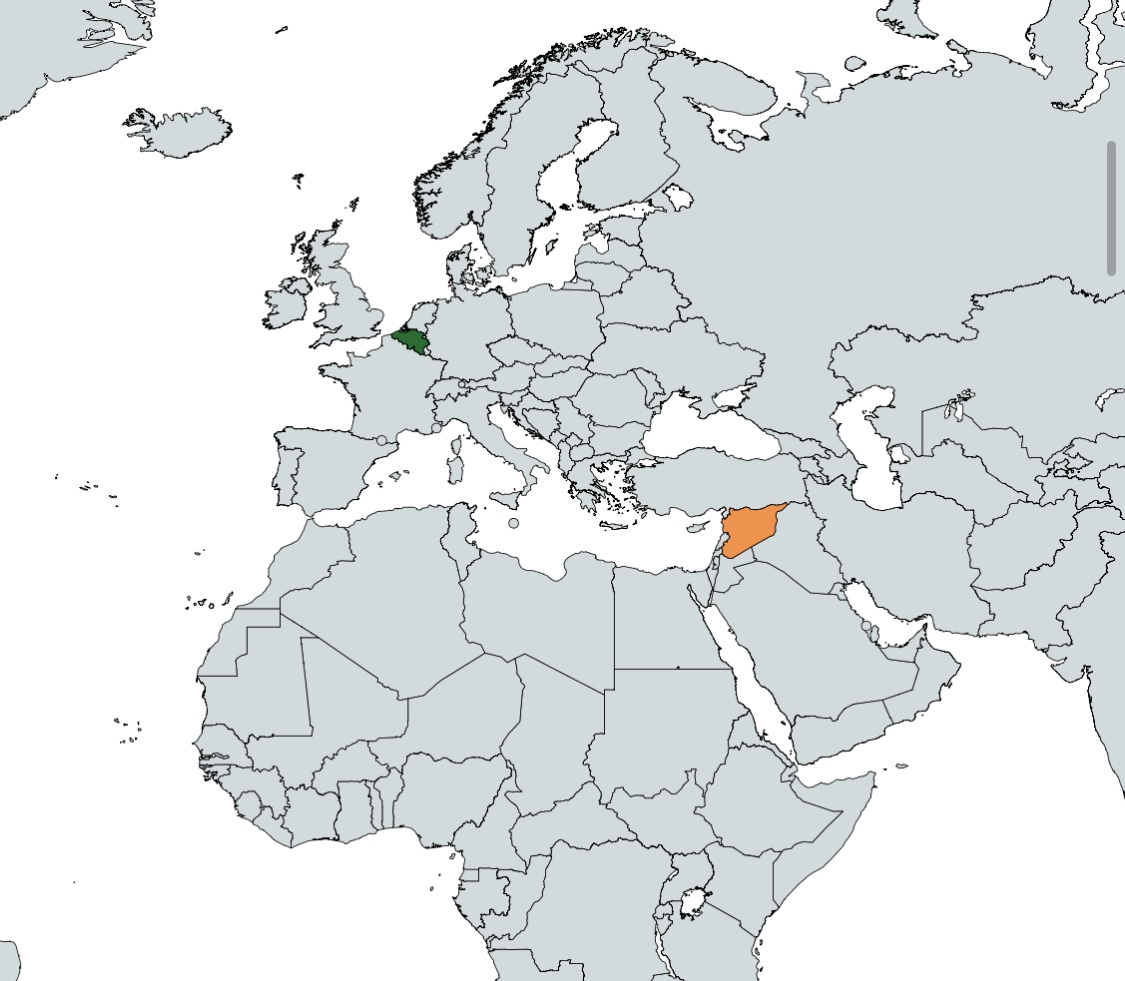
- Belgium: Syria

Diplomatic mission
- Belgian Embassy, Damascus (Closed): Syrian Embassy, Brussels (Note: Also responsible for Syrian interests in the Netherlands and Luxembourg.)

Belgium–Syria relations were established on 20 March 1946 when M.R. Taymans was appointed as Chargé d'Affaires of Belgium to Syria with residence in Beirut.

While formal diplomatic relations have existed since Syria’s independence in 1946, the nature of these ties has varied significantly, particularly in response to regional conflicts and Belgium's stance on human rights.

== Historical background ==
Diplomatic relations between Belgium and Syria began shortly after Syria’s independence from France in 1946. Throughout the 20th century, relations were generally amicable, with occasional cooperation on trade, cultural exchanges, and participation in international organizations.

Belgium closed its embassy in Damascus in 2012, and Syria still has an embassy in Brussels.

== Economic relations ==
In the early 2000s, economic ties between Belgium and Syria saw gradual growth. Belgium was an importer of Syrian textiles, agricultural products, and phosphates, while exporting machinery, chemicals, and pharmaceuticals to Syria. However, trade volume remained relatively modest compared to Syria's other European partners.

Trade relations declined considerably following the outbreak of the Syrian Civil War in 2011, as the European Union imposed economic sanctions on Syria.

== Impact of the Syrian Civil War ==
The Syrian Civil War, which began in 2011, has profoundly impacted Belgian-Syrian relations. Belgium, in line with EU policy, condemned the Syrian government’s actions against civilians and supported the imposition of sanctions on Syrian officials, businesses, and government institutions. In 2012, Belgium closed its embassy in Damascus as part of a broader EU diplomatic withdrawal from Syria. The Belgian government has expressed support for the United Nations-led peace process to resolve the conflict.

== Humanitarian assistance ==
As the conflict escalated, Belgium became involved in providing humanitarian aid to Syrian refugees and internally displaced persons. Belgium has supported aid programs run by the United Nations, the Red Cross, and other international organizations.

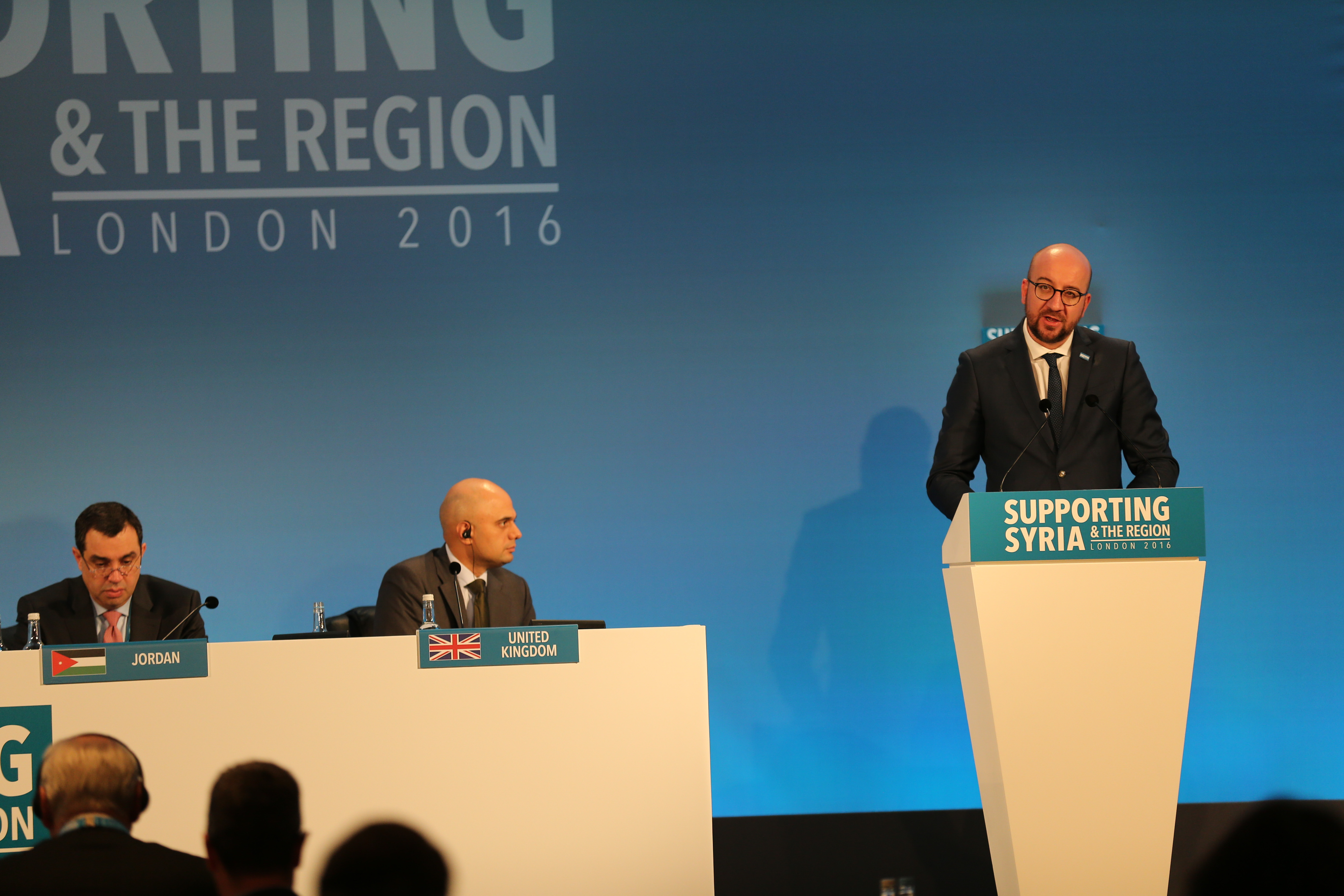
Belgian Prime Minister Charles Michel at the Supporting Syria conference, 2016

In recent years, Belgium has received a significant number of Syrian refugees. By 2020, Syrians represented one of the largest groups of asylum seekers in Belgium. The Belgian government has implemented integration programs to help Syrian refugees settle and contribute to Belgian society.

== Counterterrorism and security ==
The conflict in Syria has also raised concerns in Belgium regarding radicalization and foreign fighters. Belgium is one of several European countries with a notable number of citizens who traveled to Syria to join armed groups. Belgian authorities have collaborated with international agencies to address the return of foreign fighters and have worked to develop counter-radicalization programs within Belgium. Belgium has also participated in The Global Coalition to Defeat ISIS.

== See also ==
- Foreign relations of Belgium
- Foreign relations of Syria
