= Belgium–Ukraine relations =

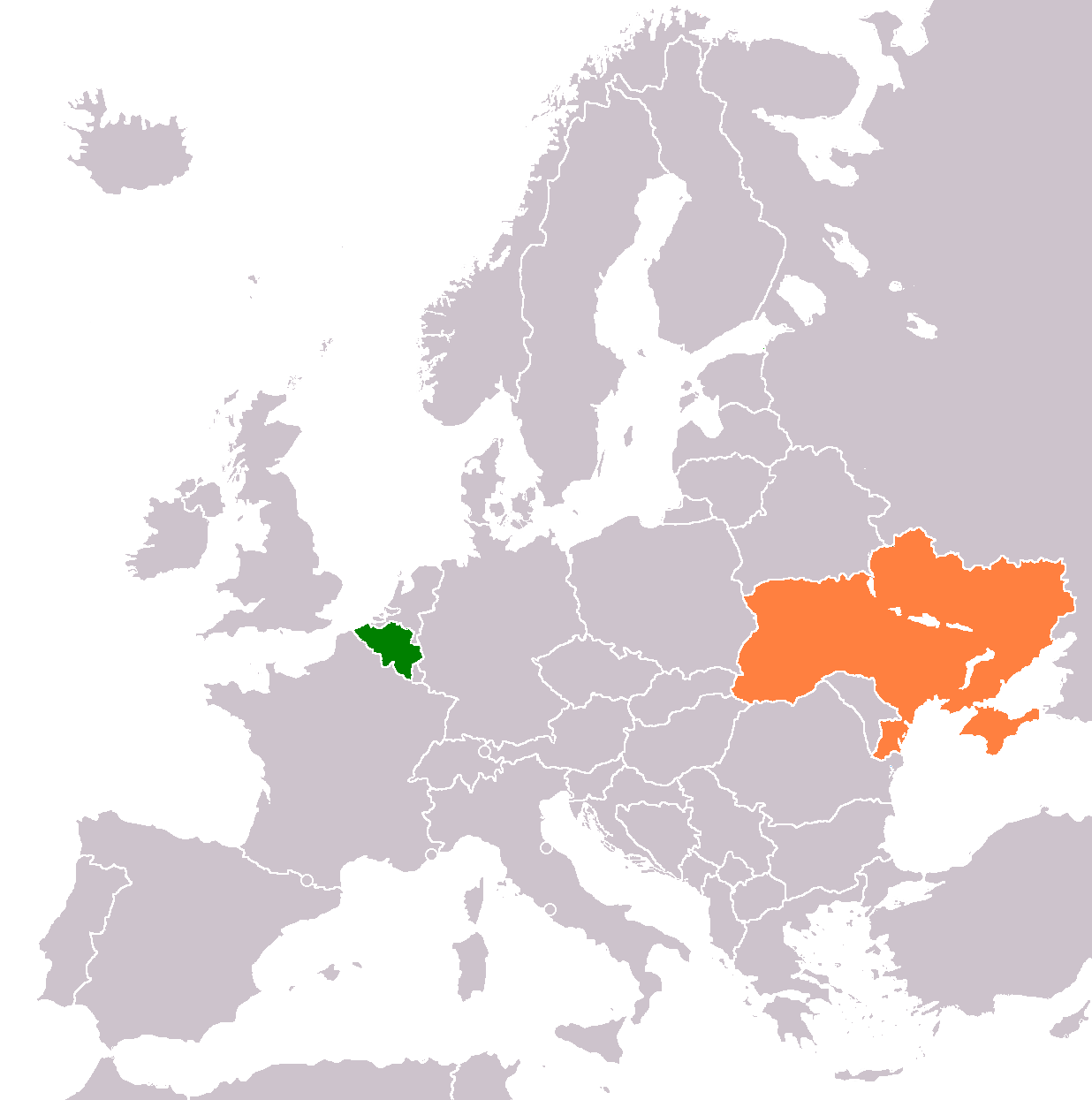
- Belgium: Ukraine

Belgium–Ukraine relations are foreign relations between Belgium and Ukraine. Diplomatic relations were established in 1992. Belgium has an embassy in Kyiv; Ukraine has an embassy in Brussels and two honorary consulates (in Antwerp and Mons). Although politically the two nations are not closely connected, they have a long history of economic integration and trade, with Belgian investment playing a role in the contemporary Ukrainian economy. Belgium is a member of the NATO and EU, which Ukraine applied for in 2022. Both countries are full members of Council of Europe.

== History ==
Trade links between Kievan Rus' and Flanders and what is now Belgium were established as early as the 11th century. By 1600, trade between the two regions had developed fully, particularly that of textiles and jewellery. Merchants from Kyiv arrived in Flanders with furs and purchased textiles. In return merchants transported wool and amber jewellery to Lviv in exchange of furs, silk and oriental seasoning.

== Economic relations ==
In October 2008, the two nations became further integrated in the agricultural sector too when Belgian firm Rattlerow Seghers and Ukrainian Elita Farms signed an agreement to develop pig production in Ukraine. Rattlerow Seghers delivered the first shipment breeding stock consisting of 192 pigs from Belgium to Elita Farms in Ukraine in January 2009. Rattlerow Seghers had exported the first breeding animals to Ukraine in 2004 and pigs have been successfully marketed using Belgian stock since the beginning of 2005, witnessing a growing demand and pressure to run larger pig farms in the country. The agreement in 2009 was made after close negotiations between the government institutes of both countries and important figures in the agricultural sector, both politically through representation and within the industry itself. Notable figures in the agreement included the Minister of Agriculture of Ukraine, Yuriy Melnyk. The agreement not only supplies breeding stock but also expert knowledge from Belgium and training programs to enhance the efficiency of the Ukrainian pig industry and facilitate growth and production after a period of economic decline.

== Political relations ==
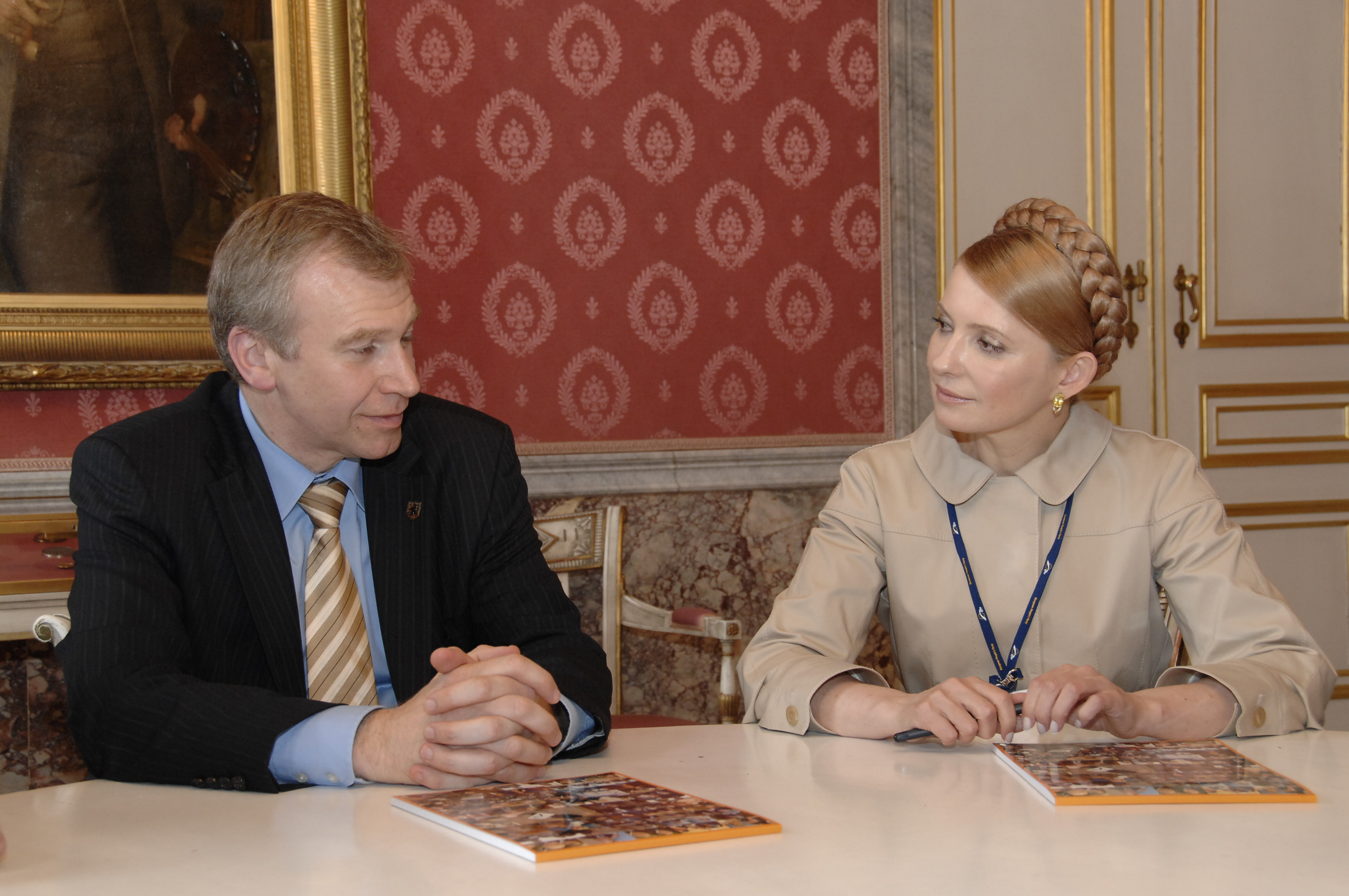
Ukrainian prime minister Yulia Tymoshenko meeting Belgian prime minister Yves Leterme in 2008

On 23 March 2009, Ukrainian President Viktor Yushchenko and Prime Minister Yulia Tymoshenko travelled to Brussels for an international investment conference to discuss the modernisation of Ukraine's gas transit system and supplies.

== Cultural relations ==
In addition the Academic Symphonic Orchestra of the National Philharmonic of Ukraine was conducted by the Belgian conductor Ronald Zollman.

== Resident diplomatic missions ==
- Belgium has an embassy in Kyiv.
- Ukraine has an embassy in Brussels.
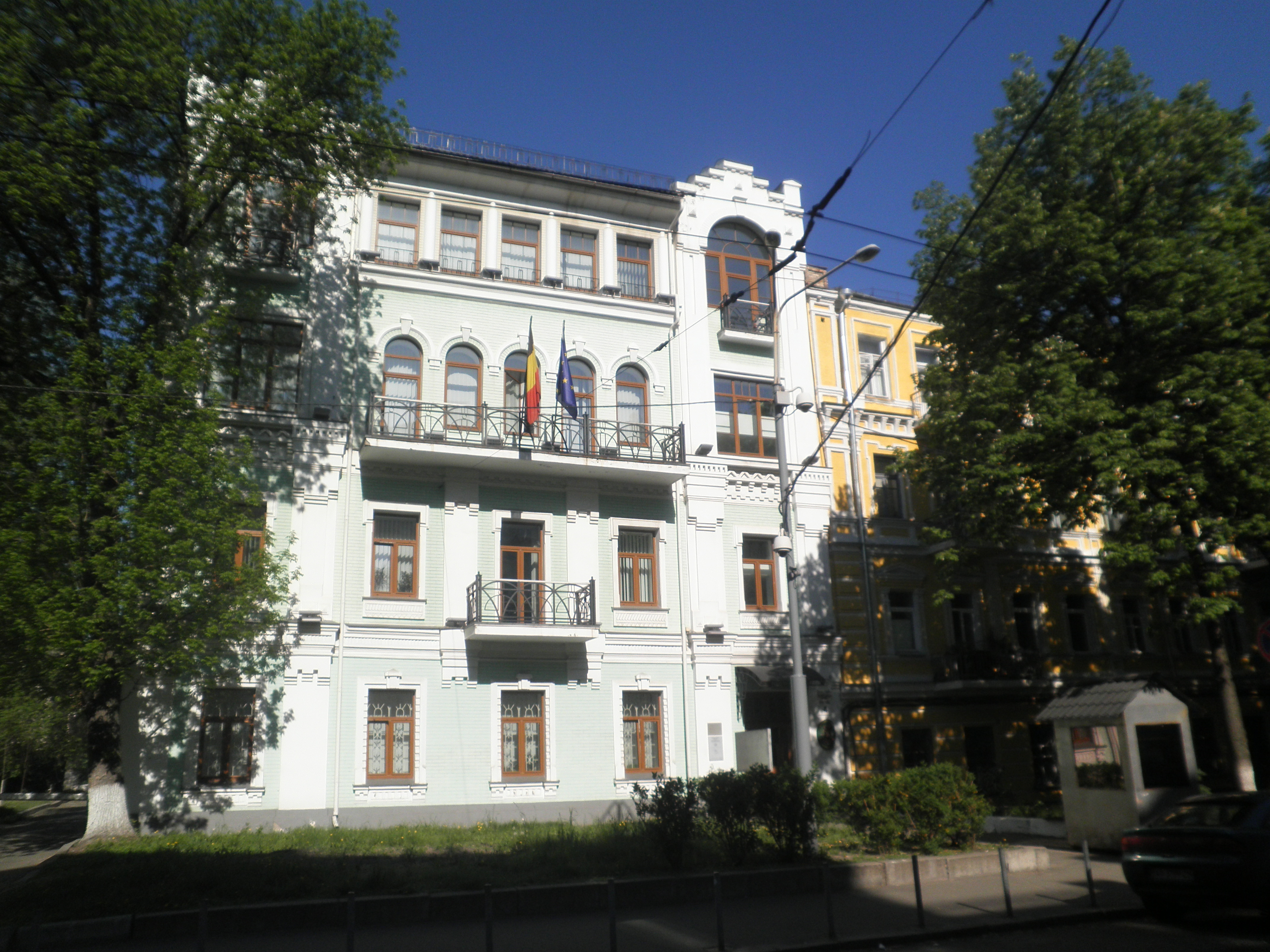
Embassy of Belgium in Kyiv

== See also ==
- Foreign relations of Belgium
- Foreign relations of Ukraine
- Ukraine-NATO relations
- Ukraine-EU relations
  - Accession of Ukraine to the EU
- Belgians in Ukraine
