= Belgium–Russia relations =

- Belgium: Russia

Diplomatic mission
- Embassy of Belgium, Moscow: Embassy of Russia, Brussels

Belgium–Russia relations are the bilateral relations between Belgium and Russia. Russia has an embassy in Brussels and a consulate-general in Antwerp, whilst Belgium has an embassy in Moscow and a Consulate General in Saint Petersburg.

Both countries are full members of the Organization for Security and Co-operation in Europe.

== History ==
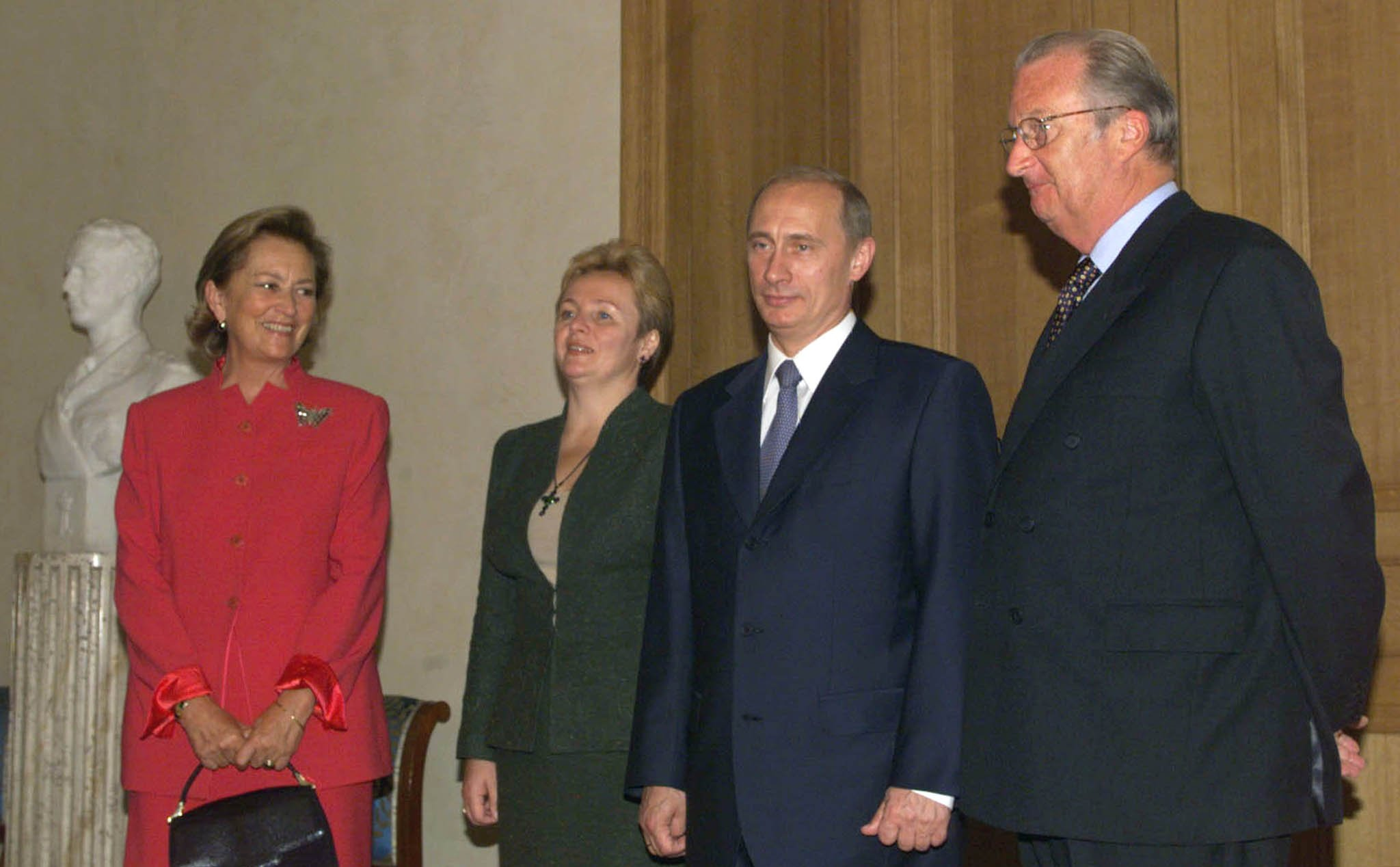
President Vladimir Putin with former King Albert II, and spouses, whilst on a state visit in Brussels in October 2001.

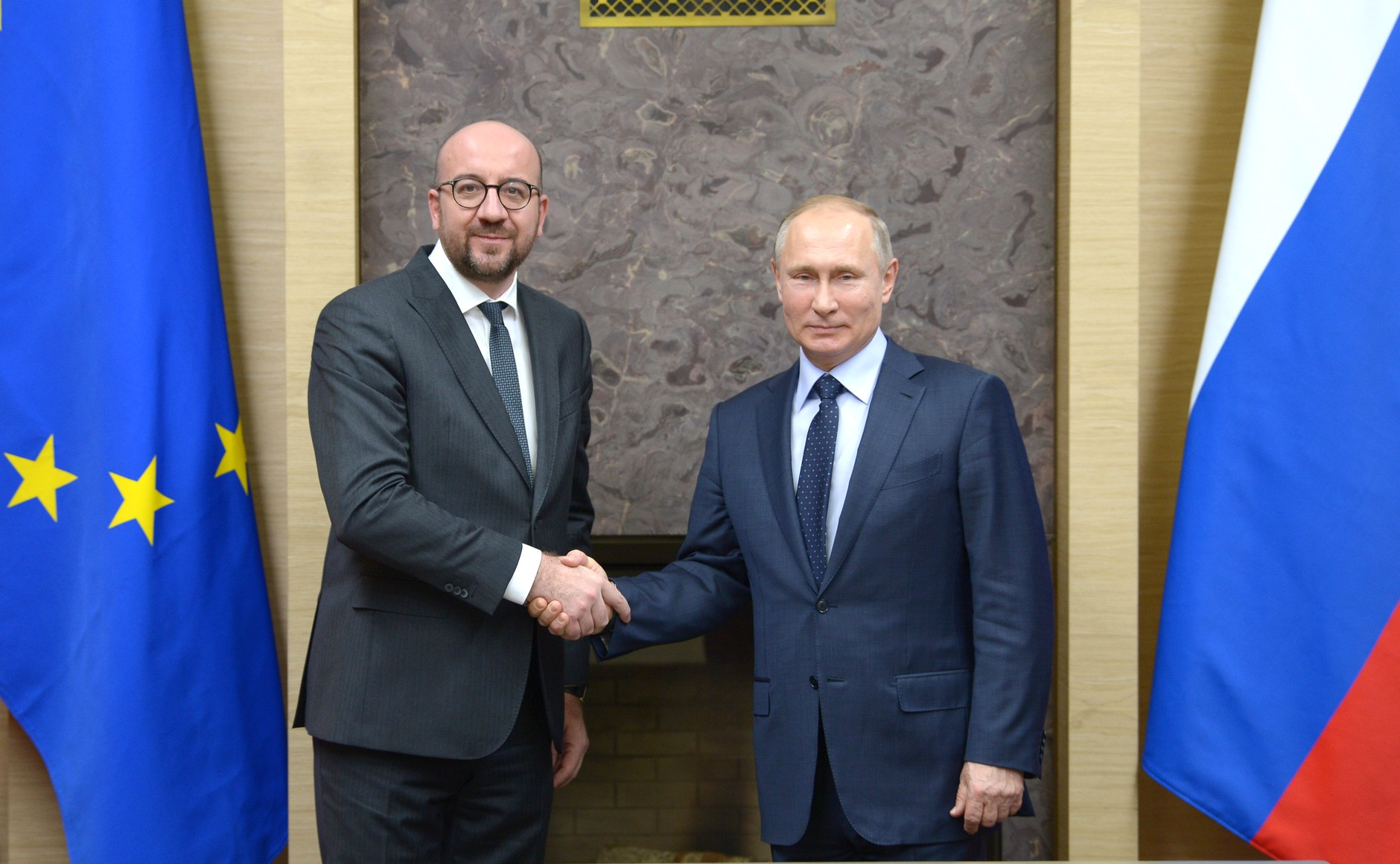
then–Belgian Prime Minister Charles Michel with Russian President Vladimir Putin in Moscow, 31 January 2018

High level contacts between Belgium and Russia began in the early 18th century, when Peter the Great visited the Southern Netherlands in 1717. Amongst towns he visited were Brussels and Spa. Peter left his mark in Spa, when he built an edifice with a portico over the main spring, which the locals renamed in his honour as Pouhon Pierre-le-Grand. Diplomatic relations were established between Belgium and the Russian Empire in 1853, when Mikhail Irineyevich Khreptovich was appointed as the first envoy of the Russian Empire in Brussels on 19 March 1853.

== Trade relations ==
In 2004, trade between the two countries totalled €4.75 billion, an increase of €1.18 billion over the previous year, with Russia holding a trade surplus of €1.51 billion in bilateral trade. Russian exports to Belgium were mainly commodities, including minerals (37%), precious and semi-precious stones (22%), ferrous and non-ferrous metals (17%) and chemical products (8%). Russian imports from Belgium were composed of industrial equipment (25%), chemicals and pharmaceuticals (18%), plastic products and rubber (9%), food (8%) and transportation (8%). In 2004, Belgium imported 30% of its oil and natural gas from Russia, although mainly spot market.

== Diplomatic issues ==
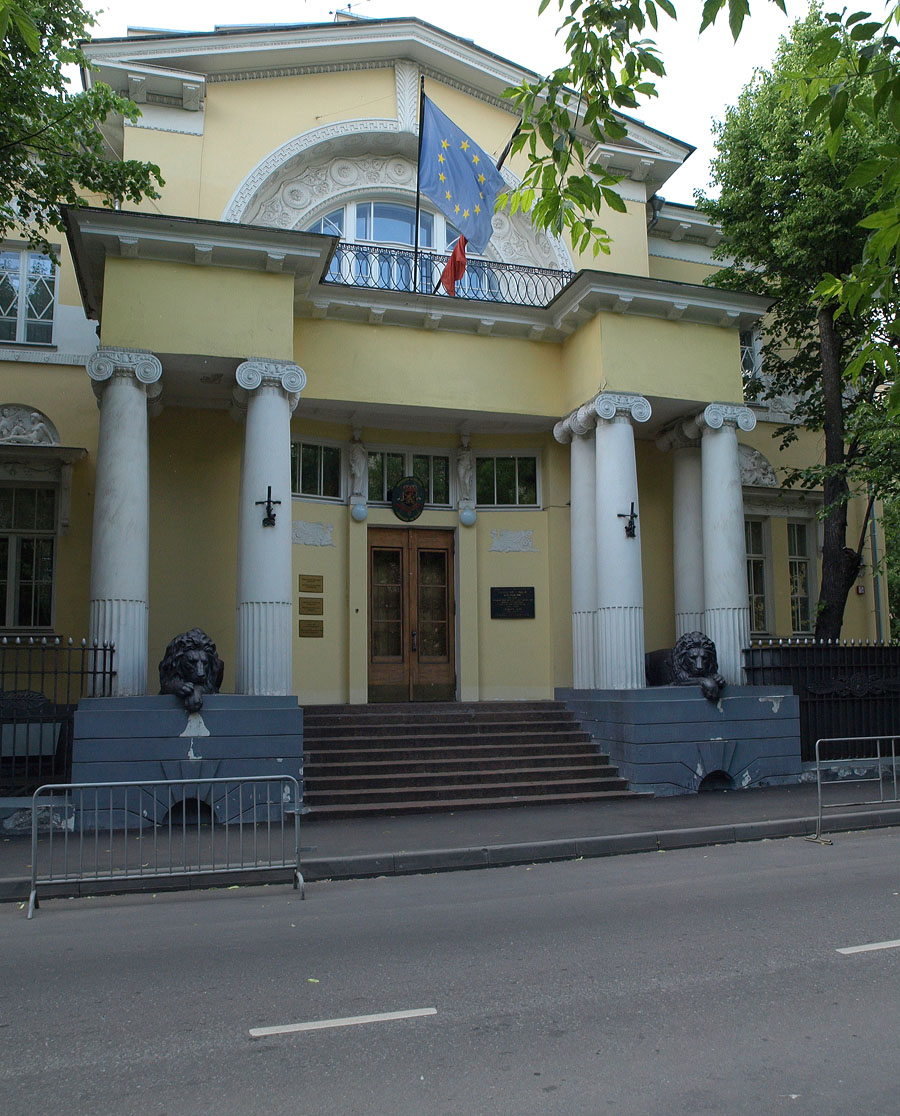
The Embassy of Belgium in Moscow

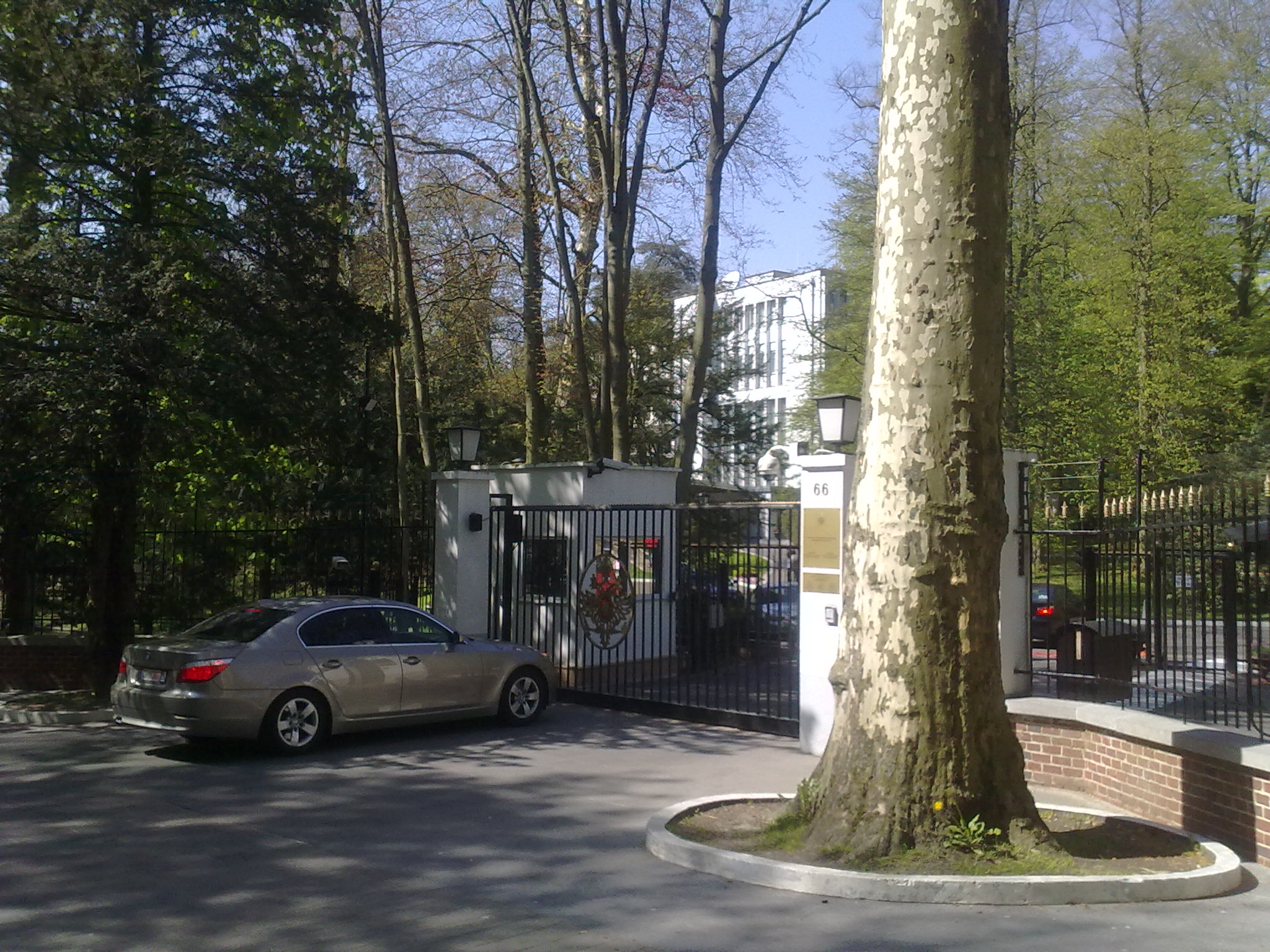
The Embassy of Russia in Brussels

After the 2022 Russian invasion of Ukraine started, Belgium, as one of the EU countries, imposed sanctions on Russia, and Russia added all EU countries to the list of "unfriendly nations". Belgium joined other countries in spring 2022 in declaring a number of Russian diplomats Persona non grata.

== See also ==
- Foreign relations of Belgium
- Foreign relations of Russia
- Russians in Belgium
