= Australia–Belgium bilateral treaties =

The following is a list of international bilateral treaties between Australia and Belgium

- Early treaties were extended to Australia by the British Empire, however they are still generally in force.
- Later European Union treaties excluded from this list

| Entry into force | Topic | Title | Ref |
|---|---|---|---|
| 1876 | Extradition | Treaty between the United Kingdom of Great Britain and Ireland and Belgium for the Mutual Surrender of Fugitive Criminals (Brussels, 20 May 1876) | |
| 1862 | Trade | Convention between the United Kingdom of Great Britain and Ireland and Belgium relative to Joint Stock Companies (London, 13 November 1862) | |
| 1876 | Extradition | Declaration between the United Kingdom of Great Britain and Ireland and Belgium amending Article I of the Treaty for the Mutual Surrender of Fugitive Criminals of 20 May 1876 (London, 21 April 1887) | |
| 1877 | Extradition | Declaration between the United Kingdom of Great Britain and Ireland and Belgium extending to Certain Additional Crimes the Treaty for the Mutual Surrender of Fugitive Criminals of 20 May 1876 (London, 23 July 1877) | |
| 1898 | Trade | Exchange of Notes establishing a provisional Modus Vivendi pending the conclusion of a Treaty of Commerce and Navigation between the United Kingdom of Great Britain and Ireland and Belgium (Brussels, 27 July 1898) | |
| 1902 | Extradition | Treaty between the United Kingdom of Great Britain and Ireland and Belgium for the Mutual Surrender of Fugitive Criminals | |
| 1907 | Extradition | Convention between the United Kingdom of Great Britain and Ireland and Belgium supplementing Article XIV of the Treaty for the Mutual Surrender of Fugitive Criminals | |
| 1911 | Extradition | Convention between the United Kingdom of Great Britain and Ireland and Belgium amending Article VI of the Treaty for the Mutual Surrender of Fugitive Criminals of 29 October 1901 | |
| 1919 | War/Peace | Agreement between the Government of the United Kingdom of Great Britain and Ireland and the Government of Belgium respecting British War Graves in Belgian Territory | |
| 1924 | Extradition | Convention between the United Kingdom of Great Britain and Northern Ireland, and Belgium, extending to the Belgian Congo and certain British Protectorates the Convention [Treaty] for the Mutual Surrender of Fugitive Criminals | |
| 1928 | Civil law | Convention between the United Kingdom and Belgium respecting Legal Proceedings in Civil and Commercial Matters | |
| 1928 | Extradition | Exchange of Notes between the Government of the United Kingdom of Great Britain and Northern Ireland (and on behalf of Australia, New Zealand and South Africa) and the Government of Belgium extending to Certain Mandated Territories the Convention for the Mutual Surrender of Fugitive Criminals of 29 October 1901, as amended | |
| 1933 | Civil law | Exchange of Notes constituting an Agreement between the Government of Australia and the Government of Belgium regarding Commercial Relations | |
| 1934 | Civil law | Exchange of Notes between the Government of Australia and the Government of Belgium respecting Commercial Relations | |
| 1935 | Civil law | Convention between the United Kingdom and Belgium supplementary to the Convention respecting Legal Proceedings in Civil and Commercial Matters of 21 June 1922 | |
| 1938 | Visas | Exchange of Notes constituting an Agreement between the Governments of Australia, India, New Zealand and the United Kingdom of Great Britain and Northern Ireland, and the Government of Belgium regarding Documents of Identity for Aircraft Personnel | |
| 1948 | Civil law | Exchange of Notes constituting an Agreement between the Government of Australia and the Government of Belgium regarding the Release of Belgian Assets held under Australian Statutes | |
| 1951 | Visas | Exchange of Notes constituting an Agreement between the Government of Australia and the Government of Belgium concerning Visas and Visa Fees | |
| 1954 | Trade | Exchange of Notes between the Government of Australia and the Government of Belgium modifying the Provisional Commercial Agreement of 3 October 1936 | |
| 1979 | Taxation | Agreement between Australia and the Kingdom of Belgium for the Avoidance of Double Taxation and the Prevention of Fiscal Evasion with respect to Taxes on Income | |
| 1986 | Extradition | Treaty on Extradition between Australia and the Kingdom of Belgium | |
| 1986 | Extradition | Protocol amending the Agreement between Australia and the Kingdom of Belgium for the Avoidance of Double Taxation and the Prevention of Fiscal Evasion with respect to Taxes on Income of 13 October 1977 | |
| 2004 | Visas | Agreement between the Government of Australia and the Government of the Kingdom of Belgium on "Working Holiday" Arrangements (Canberra, 20 November 2002) | |
| 2005 | Social Security | Agreement on Social Security Between Australia and the Kingdom of Belgium (Canberra, 20 November 2002) | |
| 2006 | Consular | Agreement with the Kingdom of Belgium on the gainful employment of certain dependants of diplomatic and consular personnel (Sydney, 19 November 2002) | |
| 2009 | Social Security | Agreement on Health Care Insurance Between Australia and the Kingdom of Belgium (Canberra, 10 August 2006) | |
| 2014 | Taxation | Second Protocol Amending the Agreement between Australia and the Kingdom of Belgium for the Avoidance of Double Taxation and the Prevention of Fiscal Evasion with Respect to Taxes on Income Signed at Canberra on 13 October 1977 as Amended by the Protocol Signed at Canberra on 20 March 1984 (Canberra, 24 June 2009) | |
