= Ethnic origins of people in Malaysia =

This page documents the ethnic origins of Malaysian residents (citizens, landed immigrants, and non-citizen temporary residents) as recorded by them on their 2010 census form. The relevant census question asked for "the ethnic or cultural origins" of the respondent's ancestors and not the respondents themselves.

As data were collected by self-declaration, labels may not necessarily describe the true ancestry of respondents. Also note that many respondents acknowledged multiple ancestries. These people were added to the "multiple origin" total for each origin listed. These include responses as varied as a respondent who listed eight different origins and a respondent who answered "Chinese Malaysian" (leading to him/her being counted once for "Chinese" and once for "Malaysian"). As with all self-reported data, understanding of the question may have varied from respondent to respondent.

Classification of 2010 Census ethnic group is as set by Inter-Agency Technical Committee (IATC) in Appendix 1. IATC is a committee formed to co-ordinate and monitor the implementation and use of standardised codes, classifications and definitions used by the Department of Statistics, Malaysia and other government agencies. For the purpose of tabulation and analysis, as well as taking into account the diverse ethnic group in Peninsular Malaysia, Sabah, Federal Territory of Labuan and Sarawak, major ethnic groups according to region as follows:

| Peninsular Malaysia | Sabah and Federal Territory of Labuan | Sarawak |
Malaysian Citizens
| Bumiputera Malay | Bumiputera Malay; Kadazan-Dusun; Bajau; Murut | Bumiputera Malay; Iban; Bidayuh; Orang Ulu; Melanau |
Other Bumiputera: Negrito; Senoi; Melayu Asli / Proto-Malay; Bajau; Balabak / Molbog; Bidayuh; Bisaya / Bisayah; Bukitan; Bulongan; Dusun; Iban; Idah / Ida'an; Iranun / Ilanun; Jawi Peranakan; Kadayan / Kedayan; Kadazan; Kajang; Kanowit; Kayan; Kejaman; Kelabit; Kenyah; Kristang; Lahanan; Lisum; Lugat; Lun Bawang; Lundayuh / Lundayeh; Malay Bruneian; Melanau; Murut; Orang Sungai / Sungoi; Penan; Peranakan; Punan; Rungus; Sabup; Sekapan; Siamese; Sian; Sipeng; Suluk / Tausug; Tabun; Tagal; Tanjong; Tidung; Ukit; Other Sabah Bumiputera; Other Sarawak Bumiputera
Other Malays / Anak Dagang; Indonesian: Malay; Acehnese; Banjarese; Batak; Cham; Buginese; Javanese; Mandailing; Minangkabau; Sundanese; Other ethnic groups from Indonesia, Philippines and Thailand
Non-Bumiputera; Chinese: Cantonese; Fuzhounese; Hainanese; Henghua; Fuqing; Hokchiu; Hokkien; Hui; Khek / Hakka; Guangxi; Teochew / Chaoshanese; Other Chinese; Indian: Muslim Indian / Malabari; Malayali; Punjabi; Sikh; Sinhalese; Tamil Indian; Tamil Sri Lankan; Telugu; Other Indians; Others: Arab; Bangladeshi; Burmese; Cambodian; Cocos Islander; Filipino; Japanese; Korean; Nepalese; Pakistani; Russian; Thai; Turkish; Vietnamese; Other Asian Nationality; British; Danish; Dutch; English; French; German; Irish; Italian; Portuguese; Scottish; Spanish; Other European Nationality; African; American; Australian; New Zealander; Eurasian; Other Nationality
Non-Malaysian Citizens (including Permanent Residents)
African; Arab; Bangladeshi; Burmese; Chinese nationals; East Timorese; Filipino; Indian nationals; Indonesian; Iranian; Japanese; Korean; Nepalese; Pakistani; Sri Lankan; Thai; Vietnamese; Refugee / Refugee Article 1/1951 / United Nations Specialised Agency / United Nations Organisation / Unspecified Nationality; Stateless / Stateless Person Article 1/1954; Other Nationality

Information collected in the census including ethnic group and citizenship was based on respondent's answer and did not refer to any official document.

Information on citizenship should be used with caution as it is subject to content and coverage errors especially for non-citizens as in censuses in most countries.
