= Malaysians =

People of Malaysia

Orang Malaysia; 马来西亚人/馬來西亞人 Mǎláixīyàrén; மலேசியர் Malēsiyar
- Flag of Malaysia

- Map of the Malaysian diaspora around the world

Total population
- c. 35–36 million (Malaysian diaspora 2,486,673)

Regions with significant populations
- Malaysia 35,888,000 (2017 est.) (excluding the diaspora)
- Christmas Island Minority populations: More than 981
- Singapore: 1,615,300
- Australia: 281,940
- United Kingdom: 90,163
- United States: 73,812
- Brunei: 48,100
- China: 26,248
- Canada: 25,340
- Taiwan: 24,323
- New Zealand: 23,000
- India: 12,109
- Germany: 10,846
- Libya: 9,000
- Ireland: 4,595
- United Arab Emirates: 4,500
- Brazil: 3,200
- Sri Lanka: 1,750

Languages
- Malay, English; Malayic • North Bornean • Melanau-Kajang • Mandarin • Land Dayak • Sama–Bajaw • Philippine • Murutic • Tamil

Religion
- Predominantly; Islam 63.5% Minority: Buddhism 18.7%; Christianity 9.1%; Hinduism 6.1%

Related ethnic groups
- Bruneians, Singaporeans, Indonesians, Thai Malays, Burmese Malays

Malaysians (Malay: Orang Malaysia) are the citizens of Malaysia. However, non-citizen residents may also claim a Malaysian identity.

The country is home to people of various national, ethnic and religious origins. As a result, many Malaysians do not equate their nationality with ethnicity, but with citizenship and allegiance to Malaysia. The majority of the population, however, belongs to several clearly defined racial groups within the country, each possessing its own distinct culture and traditions: Malaysian Malays, Orang Asli (the aboriginal population), Malaysian Chinese (including the Peranakans), and Malaysian Indians (primarily South Asian Tamils, Sikhs, and Chitty). The majority of the non-Malay and non-aboriginal population in modern Malaysia is made up of immigrants and their descendants. Following the initial period of Portuguese, Dutch and then significantly longer British colonisation, different waves (or peaks) of immigration and settlement of non-indigenous peoples took place over the course of nearly five centuries and continue today.

The term came into fruition in 1963 with the signing of the Malaysia Agreement, which provided for the union of North Borneo (Sabah), Sarawak, and Singapore with the existing states of Malaya. As such, modern-day Malaysia was formed from different regions whose inhabitants were known as Malayans in West Malaysia, or simply Sarawakians or Sabahans in East Malaysia. Following the initial formation of the Federation of Malaya in 1948, which excluded Singapore, North Borneo, and Sarawak, the country achieved its independence from the United Kingdom in 1957, with its sovereignty expanding over the latter part of the 20th century. World War II, in particular, had sparked a desire among Malayans to see their country recognised as a fully-fledged sovereign state with a distinct citizenship, ultimately culminating in the term "Malaysian" to unite all former colonies. However, Singapore would separate from Malaysia in 1965, with its citizens known as Singaporeans.

== Population ==
As of 2024, Malaysians make up 0.9% of the world's total population, having relied upon immigration for population growth and social development. Approximately 40% of current Malaysians are first- or second-generation immigrants, and 20 percent of Malaysian residents in the 2000s were not born in Malaysian soil. It is estimated, by 2031, nearly one-half of Malaysians above the age of 15 will be foreign born or have one foreign born parent. Bumiputera, according to the 2020 Malaysian Census, numbered at 17,319,906 or 61.85% of the country's 35,977,838 population.

=== Citizenship and diaspora ===
The Malaysian diaspora has a population of 2,486,673 in 2025, according to the United Nations Department of Economic and Social Affairs. Malaysia does not keep track of emigration and counts of Malaysians abroad are thus only available courtesy of statistics kept by the destination countries. The diaspora includes both descendants of early emigrants from Malaysia, as well as more recent emigrants from Malaysia.

Since independence, a total of 688,766 naturalised foreigners had been granted Malaysian citizenship while 10,828 individuals had their citizenships revoked. The community of Malaysians in Australian external territory of Christmas Island makes up the majority of the population, while Singapore has the largest minority community of Malaysians, with 1,615,300 people, followed by Australia (281,940 people), the United Kingdom (90,163 people) and the United States (73,812 people).

=== Ethnic groups and citizenship ===
Classification of 2010 Census ethnic group is as set by Inter-Agency Technical Committee (IATC) in Appendix 1. IATC is a committee formed to co-ordinate and monitor the implementation and use of standardised codes, classifications and definitions used by the Department of Statistics, Malaysia and other government agencies. For the purpose of tabulation and analysis, as well as taking into account the diverse ethnic group in Peninsular Malaysia, Sabah, Federal Territory of Labuan and Sarawak, major ethnic groups according to region as follows:

Peninsular Malaysia	Sabah and Federal Territory of Labuan	Sarawak
Malaysian Citizens
Bumiputera Malay	Bumiputera Malay; Kadazan-Dusun; Bajau; Murut	Bumiputera Malay; Iban; Bidayuh; Orang Ulu; Melanau
Other Bumiputera: Negrito; Senoi; Melayu Asli / Proto-Malay; Bajau; Balabak / Molbog; Bidayuh; Bisaya / Bisayah; Bukitan; Bulongan; Dusun; Iban; Idah / Ida'an; Iranun / Ilanun; Jawi Peranakan; Kadayan / Kedayan; Kadazan; Kajang; Kanowit; Kayan; Kejaman; Kelabit; Kenyah; Kristang; Lahanan; Lisum; Lugat; Lun Bawang; Lundayuh / Lundayeh; Malay Bruneian; Melanau; Murut; Orang Sungai / Sungoi; Penan; Peranakan; Punan; Rungus; Sabup; Sekapan; Siamese; Sian; Sipeng; Suluk / Tausug; Tabun; Tagal; Tanjong; Tidung; Ukit; Other Sabah Bumiputera; Other Sarawak Bumiputera
Other Malays / Anak Dagang; Indonesian: Malay; Acehnese; Banjarese; Cham; Buginese; Mandailing; Minangkabau; Other ethnic groups from Indonesia, Philippines and Thailand
Non-Bumiputera; Chinese: Cantonese; Fuzhounese; Hainanese; Henghua; Fuqing; Hokchiu; Hokkien; Hui; Khek / Hakka; Guangxi; Teochew / Chaoshanese; Other Chinese; Indian: Muslim Indian / Malabari; Malayali; Punjabi; Sikh; Sinhalese; Tamil Indian; Tamil Sri Lankan; Telugu; Other Indians; Others: Arab; Bangladeshi; Burmese; Cambodian; Cocos Islander; Filipino; Japanese; Korean; Nepalese; Pakistani; Russian; Thai; Turkish; Vietnamese; Other Asian Nationality; British; Danish; Dutch; English; French; German; Irish; Italian; Portuguese; Scottish; Spanish; Other European Nationality; African; American; Australian; New Zealander; Eurasian; Other Nationality
Non-Malaysian Citizens (including Permanent Residents)
African; Arab; Bangladeshi; Burmese; Chinese nationals; East Timorese; Filipino; Indian nationals; Indonesian; Iranian; Japanese; Korean; Nepalese; Pakistani; Sri Lankan; Thai; Vietnamese; Refugee / Refugee Article 1/1951 / United Nations Specialised Agency / United Nations Organisation / Unspecified Nationality; Stateless / Stateless Person Article 1/1954; Other Nationality

Information collected in the census including ethnic group and citizenship was based on respondent's answer and did not refer to any official document.

Information on citizenship should be used with caution as it is subject to content and coverage errors especially for non-citizens as in censuses in most countries.

== Culture ==
=== Language ===
Malaysia contains speakers of 137 living languages, 41 of which are found in Peninsula Malaysia. Malaysian, or Standard Malay, is the official language, while English is considered the de facto language for business. The Bumiputeras speak various Austronesian and Austroasiatic languages as well as language families with smaller number of speakers such as Tai-Kadai and Creoles. Chinese Malaysians predominantly speak varieties of Chinese from the southern provinces of China. The more common varieties in the country are Cantonese, Mandarin, Hokkien, Hakka, Teochew, Hainanese, and Fuzhou. Tamil is the predominant among Indian Malaysians, though languages like Telugu, Malayalam and Punjabi are also spoken.

=== Religion ===
The percentage distribution of Malaysian population by religion based on 2010 census.

The Malaysian constitution guarantees freedom of religion while making Islam the state religion. According to the Population and Housing Census 2010 figures, ethnicity and religious beliefs correlate highly. Approximately 61.3% of the population practice Islam, 19.8% practice Buddhism, 9.2% Christianity, 6.3% Hinduism and 1.3% practice Confucianism, Taoism and other traditional Chinese religions. 0.7% declared no religion and the remaining 1.4% practised other religions or did not provide any information.
