= Census in Malaysia =

Population and Housing Census of Malaysia, 2010
- 6 July–22 August 2010

General information
- Country: Malaysia

Results
- Total population: 28,334,135 (▲2.0%)
- Most populous state / federal territory: Selangor (5,462,141)
- Least populous state / federal territory: Putrajaya (72,413)

The census in Malaysia, or officially, the Population and Housing Census, is a descriptive count of everyone who is in Malaysia on the Census Day, and of their dwellings. The decennial Malaysian census has been conducted six times, As of 2010. It has been conducted every 10 years, beginning in 1960.

== Overview ==
The decennial publication provides users with the final Malaysian Census population figures for basic demographic characteristics such as gender, age distribution, ethnic group, citizenship, religion and marital status at the state and the administrative district levels. Some of the tables also provide a breakdown by urban and rural areas.

Malaysia consists of thirteen states and three federal territories. Each state is divided into several administrative districts. In Kelantan, the administrative district is known as "Jajahan". Each state is also stratified into urban and rural areas. Urban and rural areas are not legally defined administrative areas but are statistically defined to distinguish areas with certain socio-economic characteristics.

== Data source ==
The data in the decennial publication represent final Malaysian Census population figures for respective decades. As in censuses in most other countries, the information obtained during enumeration is subject to coverage and content errors. In term of coverage errors, part of living quarters, households or population maybe left out, erroneously included or duplicated. Content errors in particular were based on erroneous responses on gender, age, ethnic group, citizenship, religion and marital status. As a result, the figures were "adjusted" based on the estimates of under-enumeration derived from the Census Coverage Evaluation Survey.

== Census approach ==
As of Census 2010, a multi-modal data collection data method was used as follows:

- Face to face interview
  - The enumerator will visit every living quarters to interview and obtain the individual's information.
- Self enumeration
  - Drop-off and pick-up (DOPU)
    - The enumerator will drop-off the Census Kit containing a questionnaire and related documents. The questionnaire should be completed by the respondent and the enumerator will pick-up the duly completed questionnaire upon on agreed date and time.
  - e-Census
    - The respondent will complete the questionnaire online via the website www.statistic.com.my. The identification particulars are provided in the Census Kit to enable respondent to access e-Census.

Two types of census questionnaires were used. The first questionnaire for persons living in private living quarters, whilst the second questionnaire was for persons living in collective living quarters such as college or university hostels, charitable or social welfare institutions, prisons and homeless persons.

== Census coverage ==
=== Inclusion of person ===
As of Census 2010, it covered all persons including non-citizens who had stayed or intended to stay in Malaysia for more than six months in the year 2010. This includes:

- Persons commuting across the Malaysian border (e.g. Singapore, Thailand, Brunei, Indonesia) for work or study but maintaining usual residence within Malaysia;
- Malaysians who were overseas as tourists, on short-term study or attending conference, seminar or on business;
- Expatriates and other foreign workers as well as their family members;
- Foreign visitors and students;
- Foreign military, naval and diplomatic personnel and their families staying in the country except for those who have diplomatic immunity and wished to be excluded;
- Person living in the college or university hostels;
- Person living in the charitable or social welfare institutions;
- Prisoners; and
- Persons without permanent homes or homelessness.

=== Exclusion of person ===
The following categories were excluded from the census count on the basis that they were staying in the country for less than six months in the year 2010:

- Malaysian citizens and permanent residents who were away or intended to be away from the country for more than six months in the year 2010 because of work, studies, etc.;
- Military, naval and diplomatic personnel and their families who were staying outside Malaysia; and
- Foreigners such as tourists, businessmen and the like who were in Malaysia for less than six months.

=== Topics covered in the censuses ===
Topics Covered in the Population and Housing Censuses of Four Pan-Malaysia Censuses, 1970–2000
Census Topics	1970	1980	1991	2000
Geographic Characteristics
Place where person was found on Census Day	Yes	Yes	Yes	No
Place of usual residence at time of Census	No	No	Yes	Yes
Demographics and Social Characteristics
Sex	Yes	Yes	Yes	Yes
Age	Yes	Yes	Yes	Yes
Date of birth	Yes	Yes	Yes	Yes
Marital Status	Yes	Yes	Yes	Yes
Ethnicity	Yes	Yes	Yes	Yes
Religion	Yes	Yes	Yes	Yes
Citizenship / residence status	Yes	Yes	Yes	Yes
Identity card colour	Yes	Yes	No	No
Language spoken	Yes	Yes	No	No
Disability	Yes	Yes	No	Yes
Fertility and Mortality
Number of children born alive	Yes	Yes	No	Yes
Number of children living	Yes	Yes	No	Yes
Age at first marriage	No	Yes	No	No
Number of times married	Yes	Yes	No	No
Number of years married	Yes	No	No	No
Migration Characteristics
Birthplace	Yes	Yes	Yes	Yes
Period of residence in Malaysia	Yes	Yes	No	No
Period of residence in present locality	Yes	Yes	No	No
Place of last previous residence	No	Yes	No	No
Reason for migration	No	Yes	No	No
Place of residence five years ago	No	No	Yes	Yes
Year of first arrival in Malaysia	No	No	No	Yes
Education Characteristics
Literacy	Yes	Yes	No	Yes
School attendance	Yes	Yes	Yes	Yes
Highest level of school attained	Yes	Yes	Yes	Yes
Highest educational certificate obtained	Yes	Yes	Yes	Yes
Vocational training	Yes	Yes	No	No
Field of study	No	No	No	Yes
Place of obtain certificate / diploma / degree	No	No	No	Yes
Economic Characteristics
Type of economic activity (during previous weeks)	Yes	Yes	Yes	Yes
Number of hours worked (during previous weeks)	No	No	Yes	Yes
Type of economic activity (during previous weeks)	Yes	Yes	No	No
Occupation	Yes	Yes	Yes	Yes
Industry	Yes	Yes	Yes	Yes
Employment status	Yes	Yes	Yes	Yes
Occupation sector (government / private / individual)	No	No	No	Yes

== Concepts and definitions ==
=== Urban areas ===
Urban areas adopted by the previous censuses refer to gazetted local council areas with a specified population threshold. The urban areas in Census 1980 refers to a gazetted area with population of 10,000 persons or more.

Urban areas in Census 1991 and 2000, were defined as gazetted areas with their adjoining built-up areas which had a combined population of 10,000 or more. Built-up areas were defined as areas contiguous to a gazetted area and had at least 60 per cent of their population (aged 10 and above) engaged in non-agricultural activities as well as having modern toilet facilities in their housing units. The definition of urban areas for Census 2000 also takes into account the special development area namely development area which is not gazetted and can be identified and separated from the gazetted area or built-up area of more than 5 km and a population of at least 10,000 with 60 per cent of their population (aged 10 and above) engaged in non-agricultural activities as well as having modern toilet facilities in their housing units.

Meanwhile, urban areas in Census 2010, were defined as:

Gazetted areas with their adjoining built-up areas which had a combined population of 10,000 or more. Built-up areas were defined as areas contiguous to a gazetted areas and had at least 60 per cent of their population (aged 15 years and above) engaged in non-agricultural activities. The definition of urban areas also takes into account the special development area namely development area which is not gazetted and can be identified and separated from the gazetted area or built-up area of more than 5 km and a population of at least 10,000 with 60 per cent of their population (aged 15 and above) engaged in non-agricultural activities as well as having modern toilet facilities in their housing units.

Urbanisation is a dynamic process and keeps changing with development and growth. Thus, the urban areas for 1980, 1991, 2000 and 2010 Censuses do not necessarily refer to the same areas, as areas fulfilling the above criteria of urban continue to expand and grow.

=== Ethnic groups and citizenship ===
Classification of 2010 Census ethnic group is as set by Inter-Agency Technical Committee (IATC) in Appendix 1. IATC is a committee formed to co-ordinate and monitor the implementation and use of standardised codes, classifications and definitions used by the Department of Statistics, Malaysia and other government agencies. For the purpose of tabulation and analysis, as well as taking into account the diverse ethnic group in Peninsular Malaysia, Sabah, Federal Territory of Labuan and Sarawak, major ethnic groups according to region as follows:

Peninsular Malaysia	Sabah and Federal Territory of Labuan	Sarawak
Malaysian Citizens
Bumiputera Malay	Bumiputera Malay; Kadazan-Dusun; Bajau; Murut	Bumiputera Malay; Iban; Bidayuh; Orang Ulu; Melanau
Other Bumiputera: Negrito; Senoi; Melayu Asli / Proto-Malay; Bajau; Balabak / Molbog; Bidayuh; Bisaya / Bisayah; Bukitan; Bulongan; Dusun; Iban; Idah / Ida'an; Iranun / Ilanun; Jawi Peranakan; Kadayan / Kedayan; Kadazan; Kajang; Kanowit; Kayan; Kejaman; Kelabit; Kenyah; Kristang; Lahanan; Lisum; Lugat; Lun Bawang; Lundayuh / Lundayeh; Malay Bruneian; Melanau; Murut; Orang Sungai / Sungoi; Penan; Peranakan; Punan; Rungus; Sabup; Sekapan; Siamese; Sian; Sipeng; Suluk / Tausug; Tabun; Tagal; Tanjong; Tidung; Ukit; Other Sabah Bumiputera; Other Sarawak Bumiputera
Other Malays / Anak Dagang; Indonesian: Malay; Acehnese; Banjarese; Batak; Cham; Buginese; Javanese; Mandailing; Minangkabau; Sundanese; Other ethnic groups from Indonesia, Philippines and Thailand
Non-Bumiputera; Chinese: Cantonese; Fuzhounese; Hainanese; Henghua; Fuqing; Hokchiu; Hokkien; Hui; Khek / Hakka; Guangxi; Teochew / Chaoshanese; Other Chinese; Indian: Muslim Indian / Malabari; Malayali; Punjabi; Sikh; Sinhalese; Tamil Indian; Tamil Sri Lankan; Telugu; Other Indians; Others: Arab; Bangladeshi; Burmese; Cambodian; Cocos Islander; Filipino; Japanese; Korean; Nepalese; Pakistani; Russian; Thai; Turkish; Vietnamese; Other Asian Nationality; British; Danish; Dutch; English; French; German; Irish; Italian; Portuguese; Scottish; Spanish; Other European Nationality; African; American; Australian; New Zealander; Eurasian; Other Nationality
Non-Malaysian Citizens (including Permanent Residents)
African; Arab; Bangladeshi; Burmese; Chinese nationals; East Timorese; Filipino; Indian nationals; Indonesian; Iranian; Japanese; Korean; Nepalese; Pakistani; Sri Lankan; Thai; Vietnamese; Refugee / Refugee Article 1/1951 / United Nations Specialised Agency / United Nations Organisation / Unspecified Nationality; Stateless / Stateless Person Article 1/1954; Other Nationality

Information collected in the census including ethnic group and citizenship was based on respondent's answer and did not refer to any official document.

Information on citizenship should be used with caution as it is subject to content and coverage errors especially for non-citizens as in censuses in most countries.

=== Average annual population growth rate ===
The average annual growth rate was calculated as $r = \left( \frac{1}{n} \ln \frac{P_n}{P_0} \right) \times 100 \% ,$ where $r$ is the average annual population growth rate, $n$ is the exact number of years between $P_0$ is the population tally in the initial and $P_n$ in the $n$th year.

=== Population density ===
The density of persons per square kilometre is the ratio of the population of a given geographic area to the number of square kilometres in the same area.

=== Median age ===
The median age is the age that divides the distribution of the population into two, such that half the population is below the age and half is above it.

=== Dependency ratio ===
Dependency ratio refers to the ratio of the number of persons below the age of 15 years and the number of persons aged 65 years and over to the number of persons aged 15–64 years; multiplied by 100.

=== Sex ratio ===
The sex ratio is the number of females per 1000 males.

=== Marital status ===
- Never married
  - Refers to persons who were never married
- Married
  - Refers to persons who were currently married at the time of enumeration. The term 'married', includes those married by law or by religious rites or were living together by mutual agreement.
- Widowed
  - Refers to those whose marriages were terminated through death of their spouses and were not remarried at the time of enumeration.
- Divorced / permanently separated
  - Refers to those whose marriages were terminated through divorce by law or religion agreement or separated for a long duration without any possibility of reconciliation.

=== Mean age at first marriage ===
The mean age at first marriage refers to the singulate mean age at marriage which is an indicate measure of the mean age at first marriage among those who would ever marry. It is derived from the proportions never married at different age groups.

=== Religion ===
Refers to the identification or relationship of an individual to a system of beliefs and the practice of these beliefs. For the purpose of tabulation and analysis, the classification for religion is as follows:

- Islam;
- Christianity;
- Buddhism;
- Hinduism;
- Confucianism, Taoism and Tribal / Folk / Other traditional Chinese religion;
- Other religion including Sikhism and Bahai;
- No religion; and
- Unknown.

=== Area or boundary changes ===
After the year 2000, there were several new areas created or boundary changes that were gazetted by the relevant authority for federal territory and administrative districts. The new federal territory created was Putrajaya. Meanwhile, the new administrative districts such as Ledang and Kulaijaya in Johor; Pokok Sena in Kedah; Kampar in Perak; Putatan in Sabah; and Pakan and Selangau in Sarawak.
