= List of cities and towns in Malaysia by population =

This article details the list of the most populous settlements in Malaysia. Malaysia designates all populated regions into three categories: a district, municipality, or city. While district boundaries are limited to individual state-drawn district boundaries, some municipalities and cities are made up of several smaller component districts whose elevated status forms a local government. Thus, this list does not include component districts and only includes overall administrative localities defined by their respective local governments.

== Within defined boundaries ==
This table lists all cities, municipalities, and districts in Malaysia whose population exceeds 250,000 people, according to statistics published in the 2020 Malaysian census by the Malaysian Department of Statistics (DOSM). There are 34 populated regions in Malaysia whose population exceeds 250,000 people. All 13 states and the Federal Territories have at least one city, municipality or district whose population exceeded 250,000 people.

This table displays:

1. The settlement name;
2. The state in which the settlement is located;
3. The settlement's population as of 2020, as estimated in the 2020 census conducted by the DOSM;
4. The settlement's population as of 2010, as estimated in the 2010 census conducted by the DOSM;
5. The settlement's population difference between 2010 and 2020;
6. The land area of the settlement's defined boundaries in square kilometres (km^{2});
7. The population density of the settlement in people per square kilometres (/km^{2}), as estimated by the settlement's 2020 population figures.

Key (local governments and capital status)
| | Regions administered by city halls and councils (Dewan/Majlis Bandaraya) |
| | Regions administered by municipal councils (Majlis Perbandaran) |
| | Regions administered by district councils (Majlis Daerah) |
| ^{†} | National capital |
| ^{#} | State administrative capitals |
| ^{*} | State royal capitals |

List of the largest cities, municipalities, districts in Malaysia (with population figures over 250,000 people)
| City, municipality or district (Local government) | State | Government census figures | | | Land area | Density (Note: Derived from the 2020 census.) |
| City, municipality or district (Local government) | State | 2020 | 2010 | Change | Land area | Density |
|---|---|---|---|---|---|---|
| Kuala Lumpur^{†} | Federal Territories | 1,982,112 | 1,588,750 | +24.76% | 243 km^{2} | 8,156/km^{2} |
| Kajang | Selangor | 1,047,356 | 795,522 | +31.66% | 788 km^{2} | 1,329/km^{2} |
| Seberang Perai | Penang | 946,092 | 818,097 | +15.65% | 751 km^{2} | 1,265/km^{2} |
| Subang Jaya | Selangor | 902,086 | 708,296 | +27.36% | 162 km^{2} | 5,568/km^{2} |
| Klang^{*} | Selangor | 902,025 | 744,062 | +21.23% | 573 km^{2} | 1,574/km^{2} |
| Johor Bahru^{#} | Johor | 858,118 | 497,067 | +72.64% | 373 km^{2} | 2,300/km^{2} |
| Shah Alam^{#} | Selangor | 812,327 | 541,306 | +50.07% | 290 km^{2} | 2,801/km^{2} |
| George Town^{#} | Penang | 794,313 | 708,127 | +12.17% | 306 km^{2} | 2,596/km^{2} |
| Petaling Jaya | Selangor | 771,687 | 613,977 | +25.69% | 97 km^{2} | 7,955/km^{2} |
| Selayang | Selangor | 764,327 | 542,409 | +40.91% | 546 km^{2} | 1,400/km^{2} |
| Ipoh^{#} | Perak | 759,952 | 657,892 | +15.51% | 643 km^{2} | 1,182/km^{2} |
| Seremban^{#} (Note: The present municipal government administering the regions of Seremban merged with the now-defunct Nilai municipal government (of the town of Nilai) in 2020.) | Negeri Sembilan | 681,541 | 515,490 | +32.21% | 923 km^{2} | 738/km^{2} |
| Iskandar Puteri (Note: Formerly known as Nusajaya until 2015.) | Johor | 575,977 | 529,074 | +8.87% | 403 km^{2} | 1,429/km^{2} |
| Kuantan^{#} | Pahang | 548,014 | 427,515 | +28.19% | 324 km^{2} | 1,691/km^{2} |
| Sungai Petani | Kedah | 545,053 | 443,488 | +22.90% | 913 km^{2} | 597/km^{2} |
| Ampang Jaya | Selangor | 531,904 | 468,961 | +13.42% | 144 km^{2} | 3,964/km^{2} |
| Kota Kinabalu^{#} | Sabah | 500,425 | 452,058 | +10.70% | 352 km^{2} | 1,422/km^{2} |
| Malacca City^{#} (Note: Malacca City's administrative zone was separated into two when a breakaway municipality, Hang Tuah Jaya, was created in 2010.) | Melaka | 453,904 | – | – | 270 km^{2} | 1,681/km^{2} |
| Sandakan | Sabah | 439,050 | 396,290 | +10.79% | 2,275 km^{2} | 193/km^{2} |
| Alor Setar^{#} | Kedah | 423,868 | 405,523 | +4.52% | 666 km^{2} | 636/km^{2} |
| Tawau | Sabah | 420,806 | 397,673 | +5.82% | 6,149 km^{2} | 68/km^{2} |
| Batu Pahat | Johor | 401,210 | 209,461 | +91.54% | 1,873 km^{2} | 214/km^{2} |
| Kota Bharu | Kelantan | 396,193 | 314,964 | +25.79% | 116 km^{2} | 3,415/km^{2} |
| Kuala Terengganu^{#*} | Terengganu | 375,424 | 337,533 | +11.23% | 605 km^{2} | 621/km^{2} |
| Kuching^{#} | Sarawak | 349,147 | 325,132 | +7.39% | 431 km^{2} | 810/km^{2} |
| Sepang | Selangor | 324,585 | 207,354 | +56.54% | 619 km^{2} | 524/km^{2} |
| Kulim | Kedah | 319,056 | 281,260 | +13.44% | 774 km^{2} | 412/km^{2} |
| Muar^{*} | Johor | 314,776 | 201,148 | +56.49% | 1,376 km^{2} | 229/km^{2} |
| Pasir Gudang | Johor | 312,437 | 46,571 | +570.88% | 360 km^{2} | 868/km^{2} |
| Kuala Langat | Selangor | 307,418 | 220,214 | +39.60% | 858 km^{2} | 358/km^{2} |
| Kulai | Johor | 294,156 | 234,532 | +25.42% | 747 km^{2} | 394/km^{2} |
| Kangar^{#} | Perlis | 284,853 | 225,590 | +26.27% | 795 km^{2} | 358/km^{2} |
| Kuala Selangor | Selangor | 281,717 | 205,257 | +37.25% | 1,195 km^{2} | 236/km^{2} |
| Padawan | Sarawak | 260,058 | 273,485 | −4.91% | 984 km^{2} | 264/km^{2} |

=== Distribution ===
The population of Peninsular Malaysia by local government area, 2020

There are 34 settlements in Malaysia with a population of over 250,000 people. All 13 states and the Federal Territories have at least one settlement in the list. West Malaysia has more settlements that fit this criterion than East Malaysia, with 29 settlements against the East's five. The states with the smallest number of settlements in this list are Kelantan, Melaka, Negeri Sembilan, Pahang, Perak, Perlis, Terengganu and the Federal Territories, with one locality each respectively, while the state with the highest number of settlements with a population above 250,000 is Selangor, with 10 settlements in the list.

| Population | States | | | | | | | | | | | | | | Regions | | Total |
| Population | JHR | KDH | KTN | MLK | NSN | PHG | PNG | PRK | PLS | SBH | SWK | SGR | TRG | FT | WM | EM | Total |
|---|---|---|---|---|---|---|---|---|---|---|---|---|---|---|---|---|---|
| 1,000,000+ | – | – | – | – | – | – | – | – | – | – | – | 1 | – | 1 | 2 | – | 2 |
| 750,000–999,999 | 3 | – | – | – | – | – | 2 | 1 | – | – | – | 5 | – | – | 9 | – | 9 |
| 500,000–749,999 | 18 | 11 | – | – | 1 | 7 | – | – | – | 1 | – | 1 | – | – | 5 | 1 | 6 |
| 250,000–499,999 | 14 | 21 | 1 | 1 | – | – | – | – | 18 | 2 | 26 | 3 | 1 | – | 13 | 4 | 17 |
| Total | 35 | 32 | 1 | 1 | 1 | 7 | 2 | 1 | 18 | 3 | 26 | 10 | 1 | 1 | 29 | 5 | 34 |

=== Gallery ===
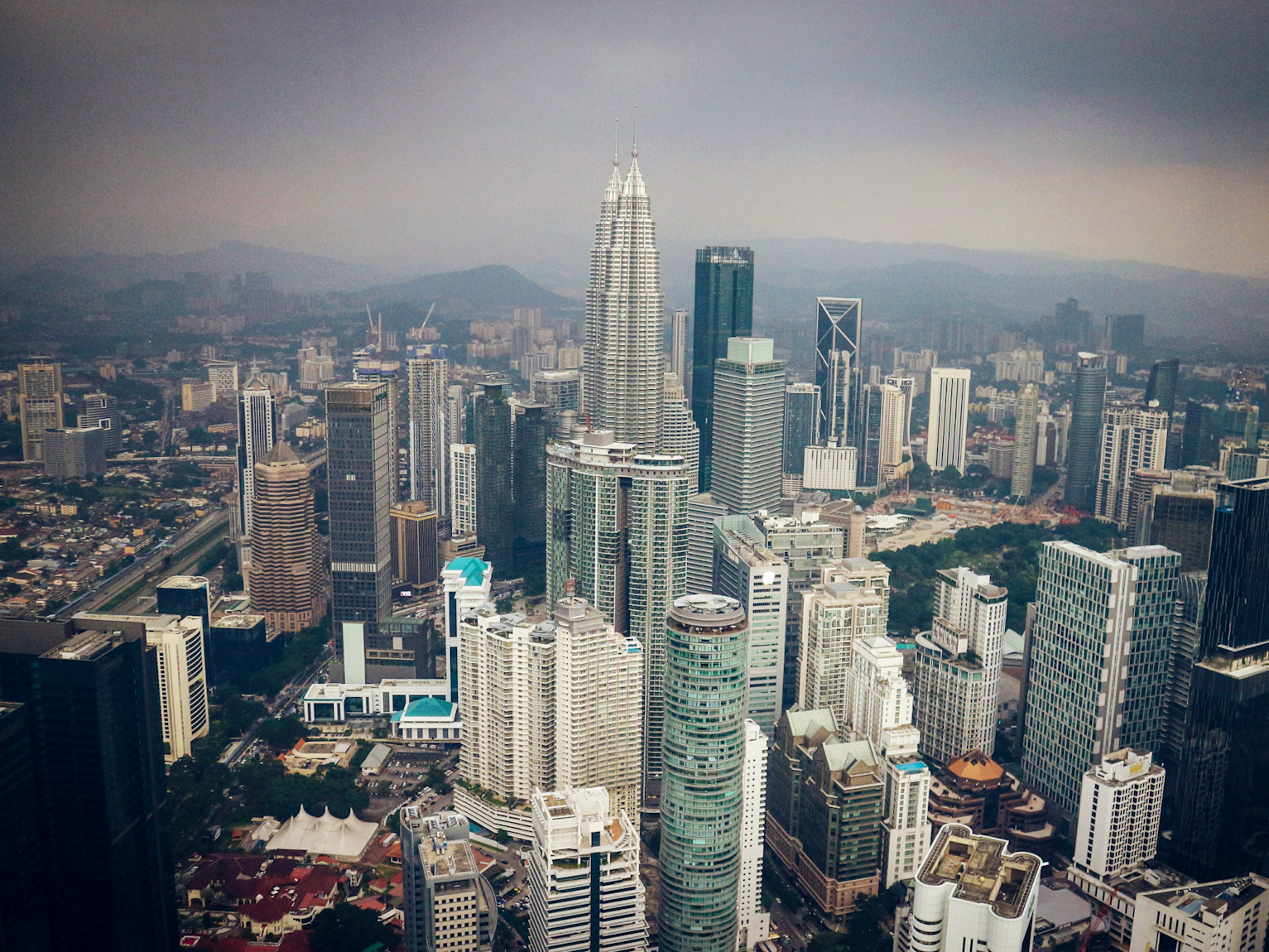
1. Kuala Lumpur, Federal Territories

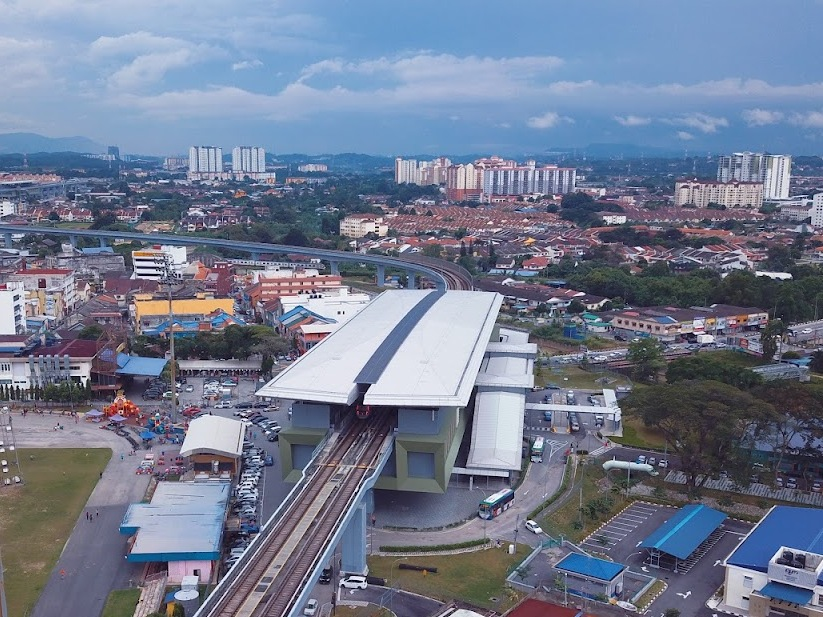
2. Kajang, Selangor

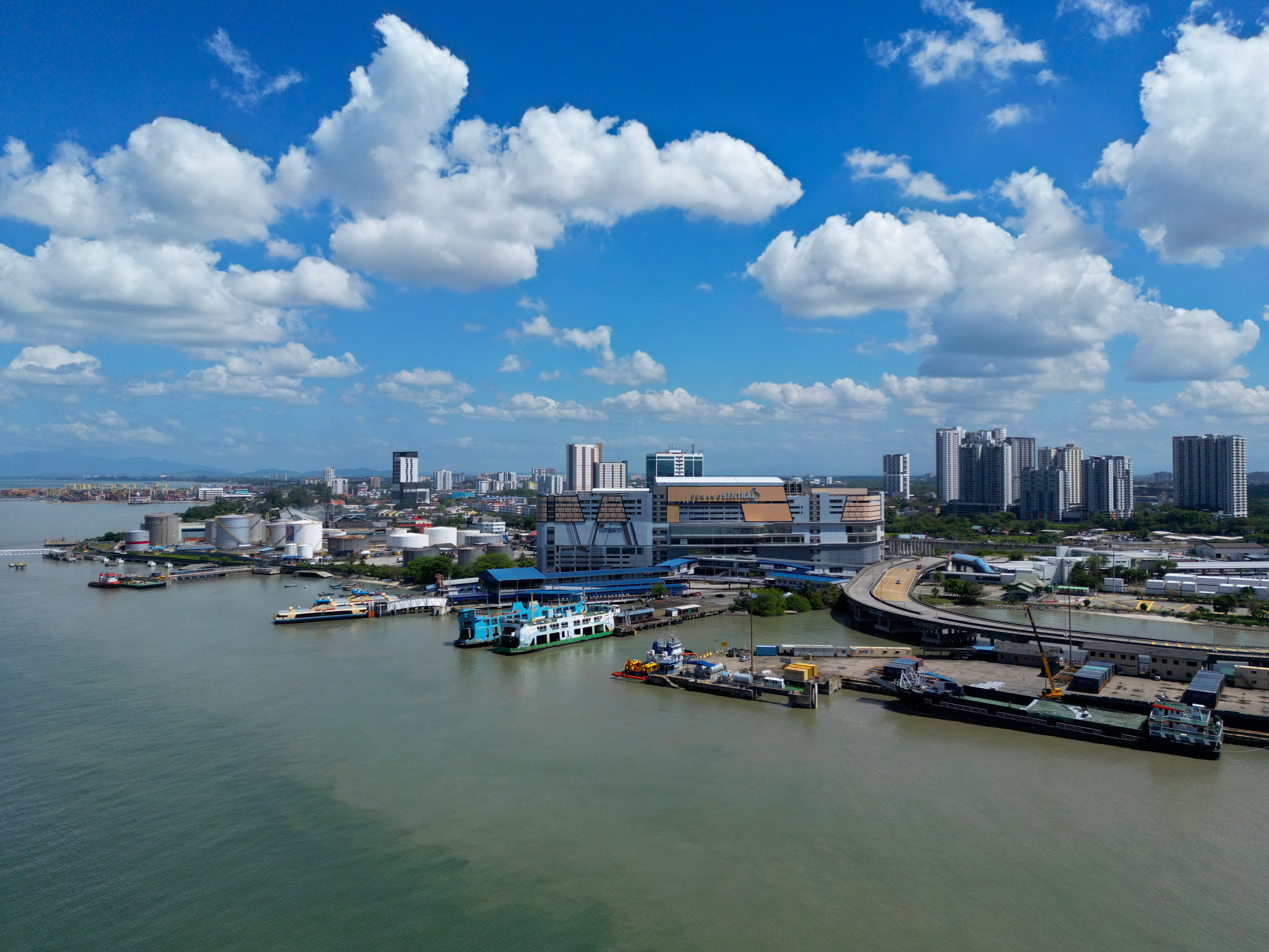
3. Seberang Perai, Penang

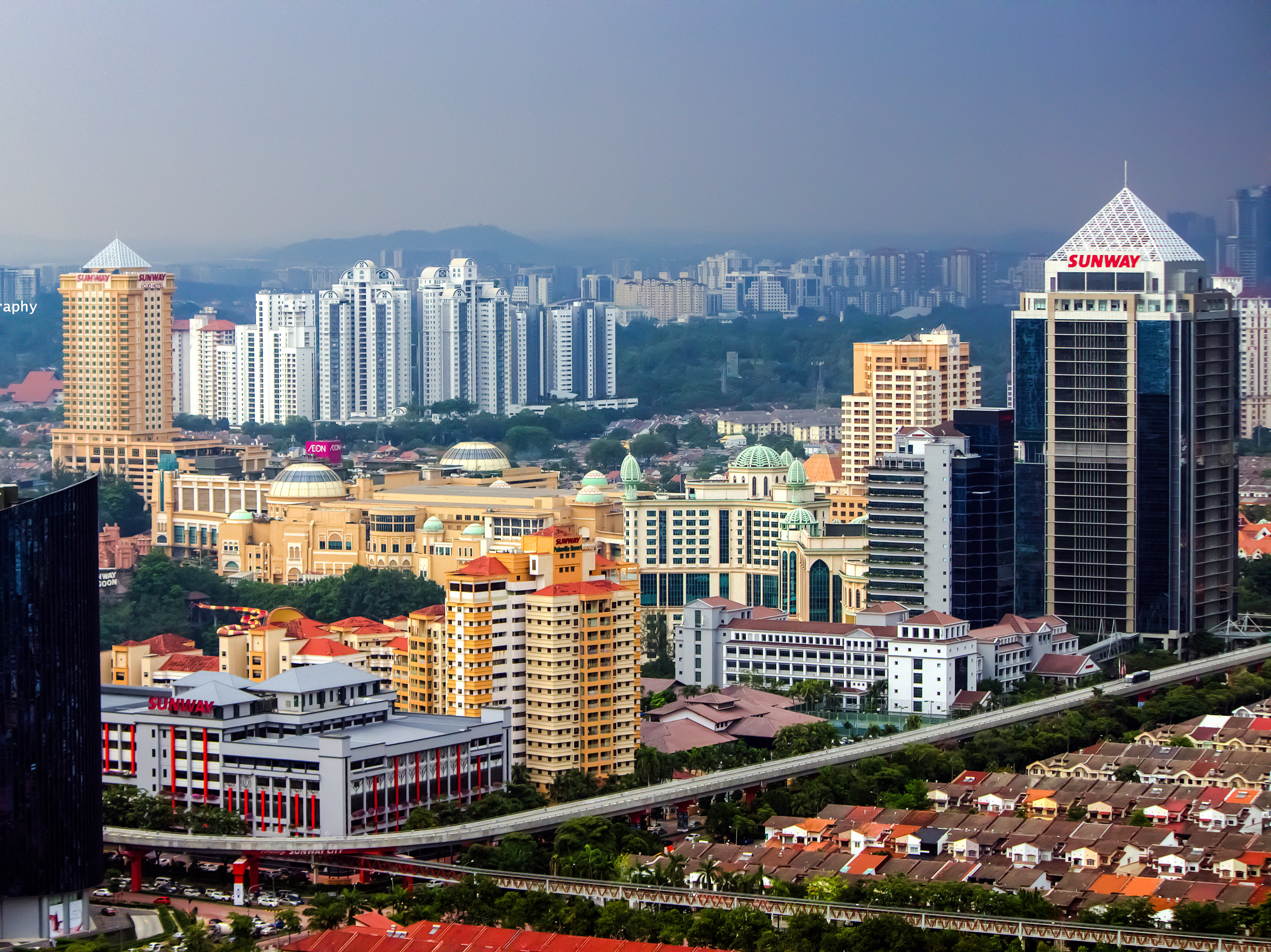
4. Subang Jaya, Selangor

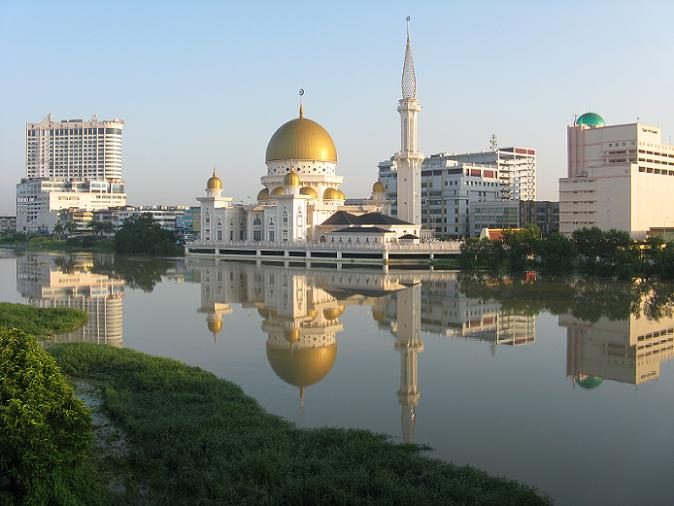
5. Klang, Selangor

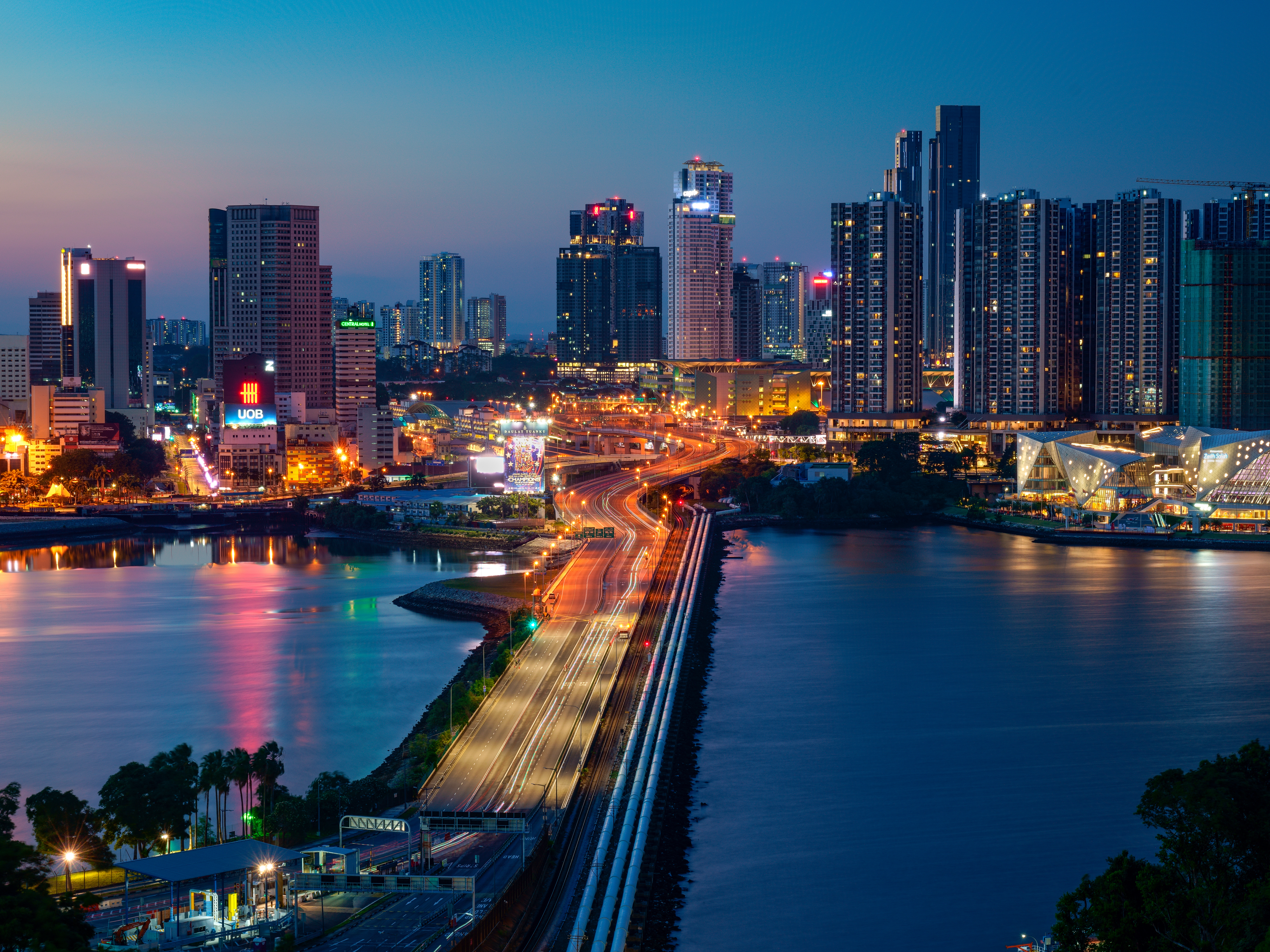
6. Johor Bahru, Johor

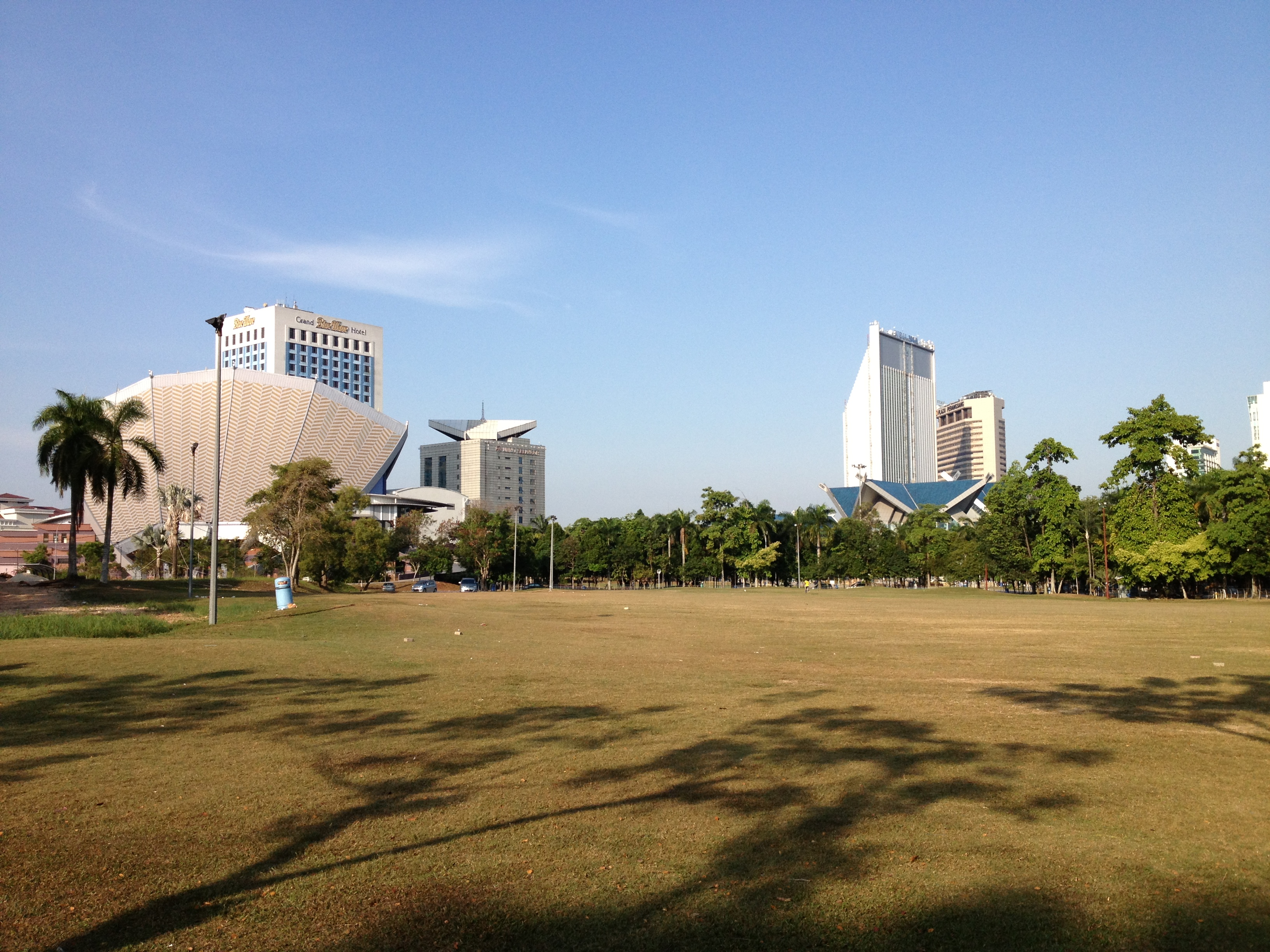
7. Shah Alam, Selangor

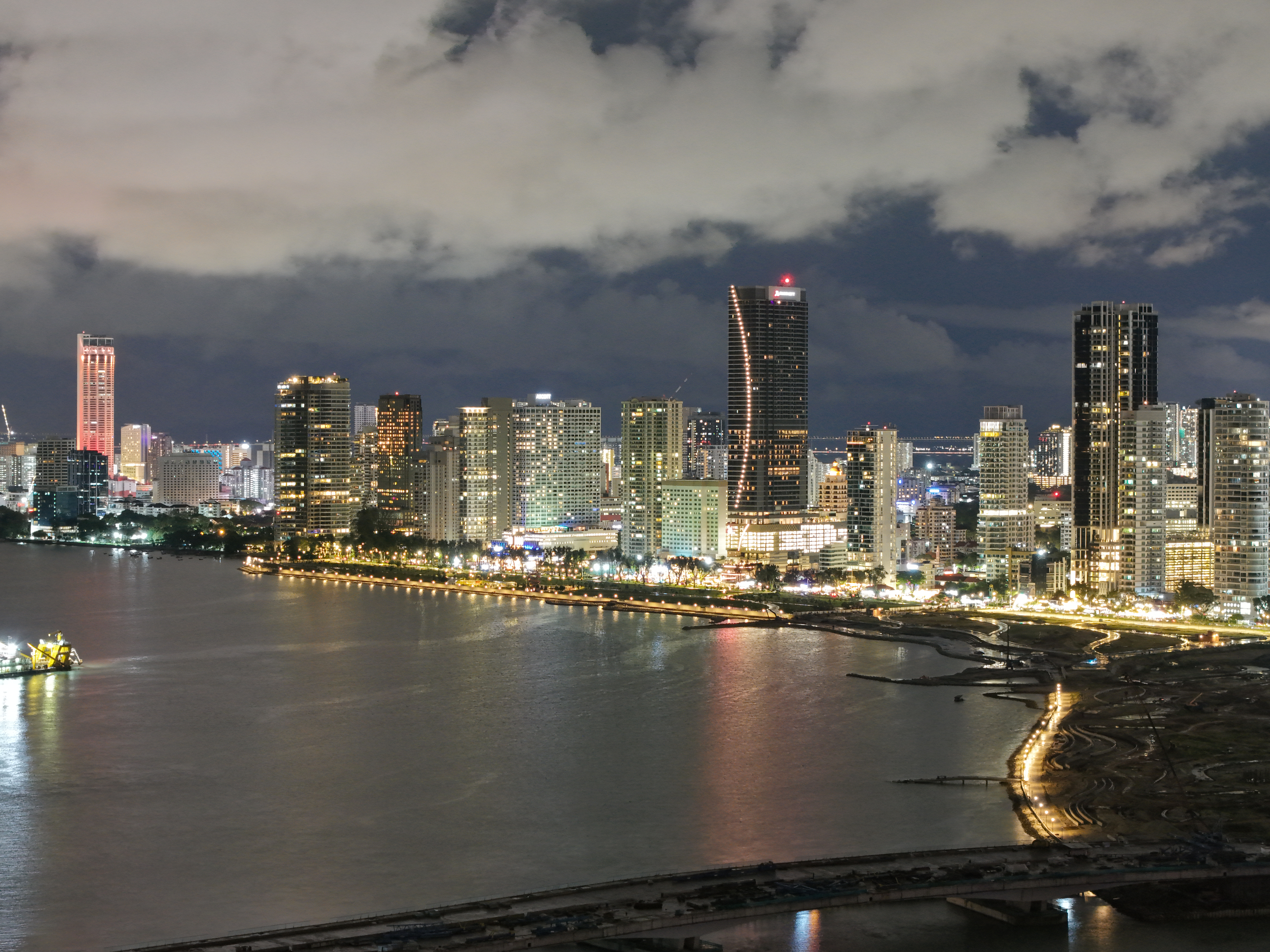
8. George Town, Penang

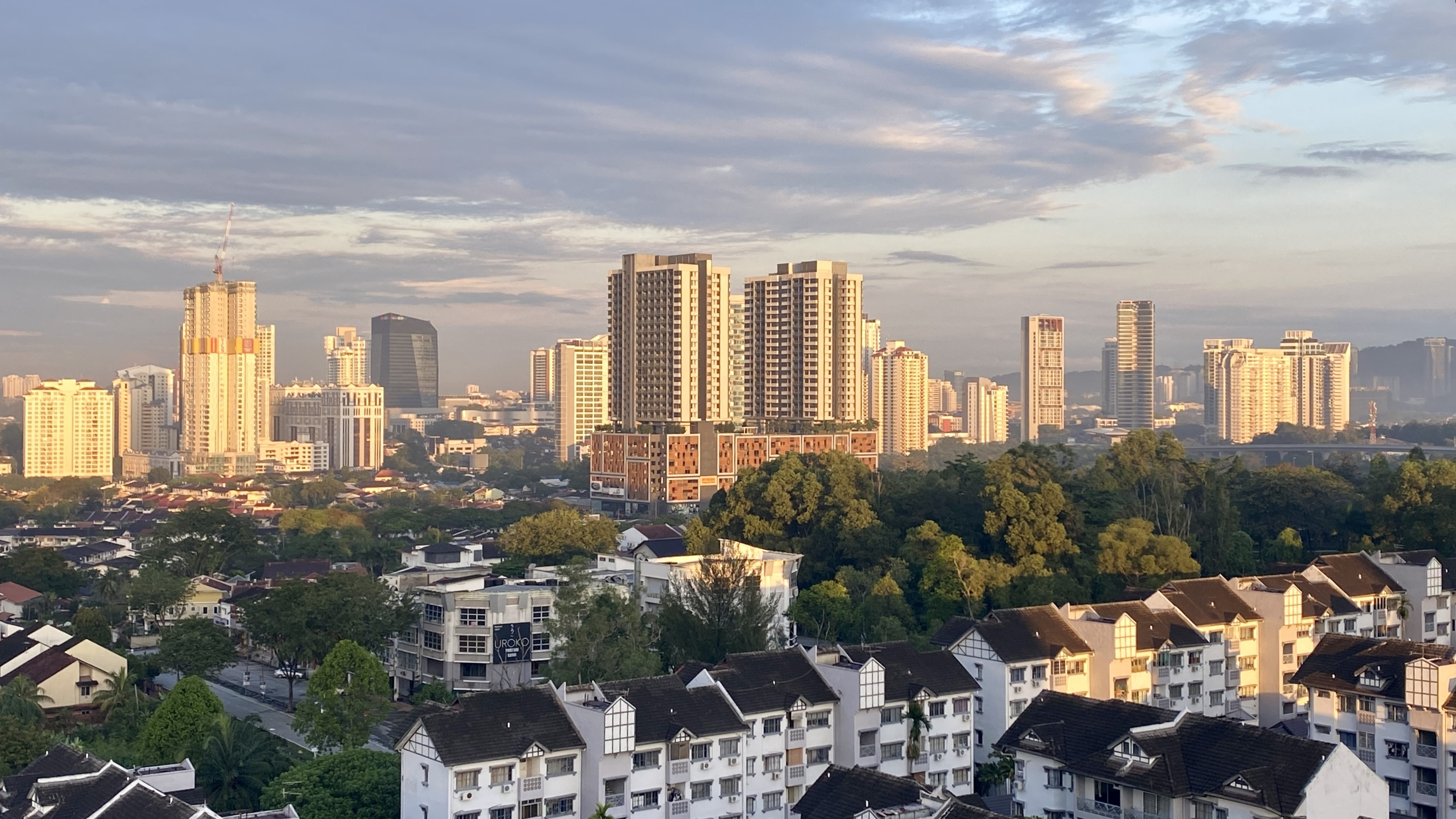
9. Petaling Jaya, Selangor

10. Selayang, Selangor

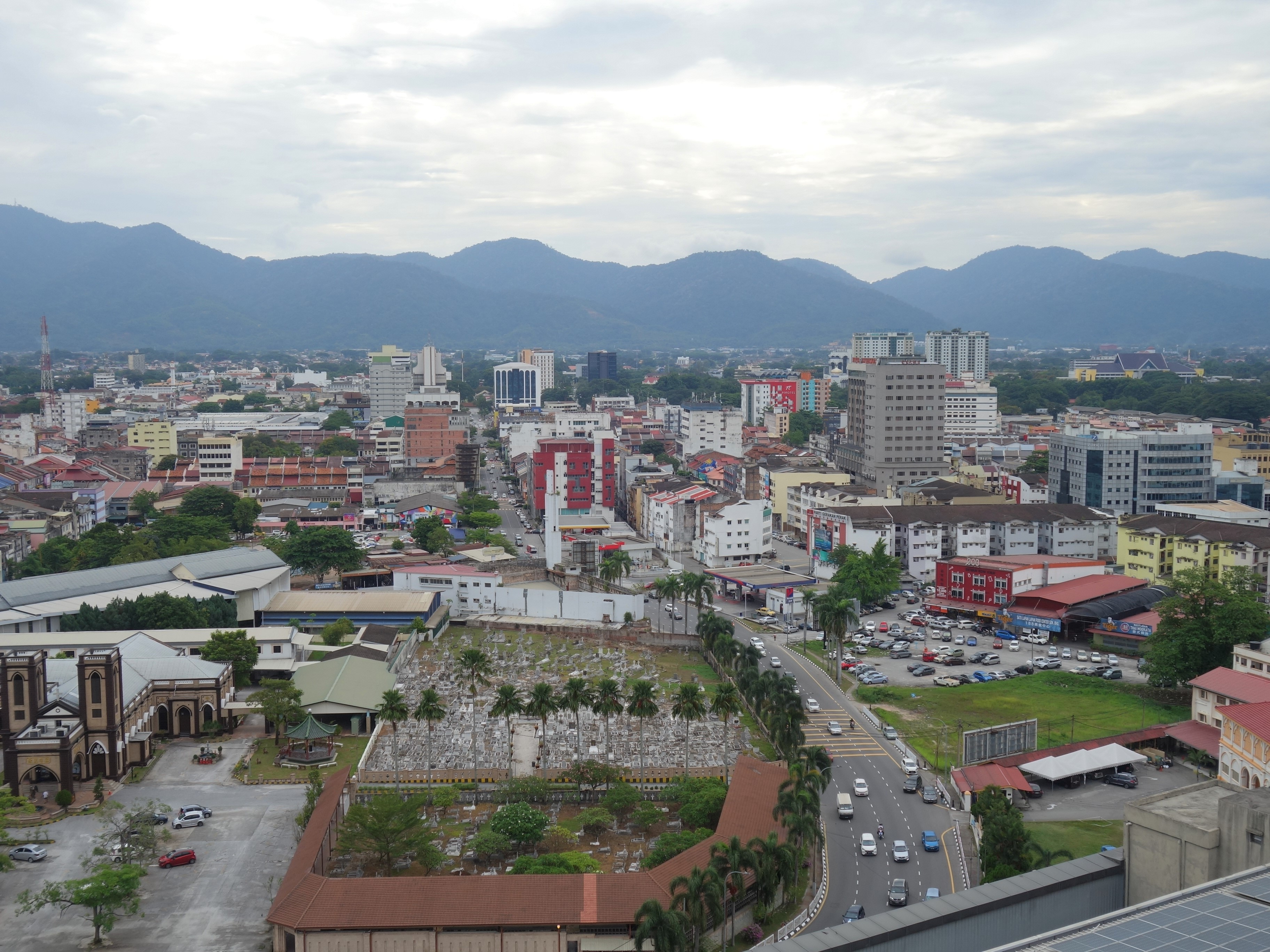
11. Ipoh, Perak

12. Seremban, Negeri Sembilan

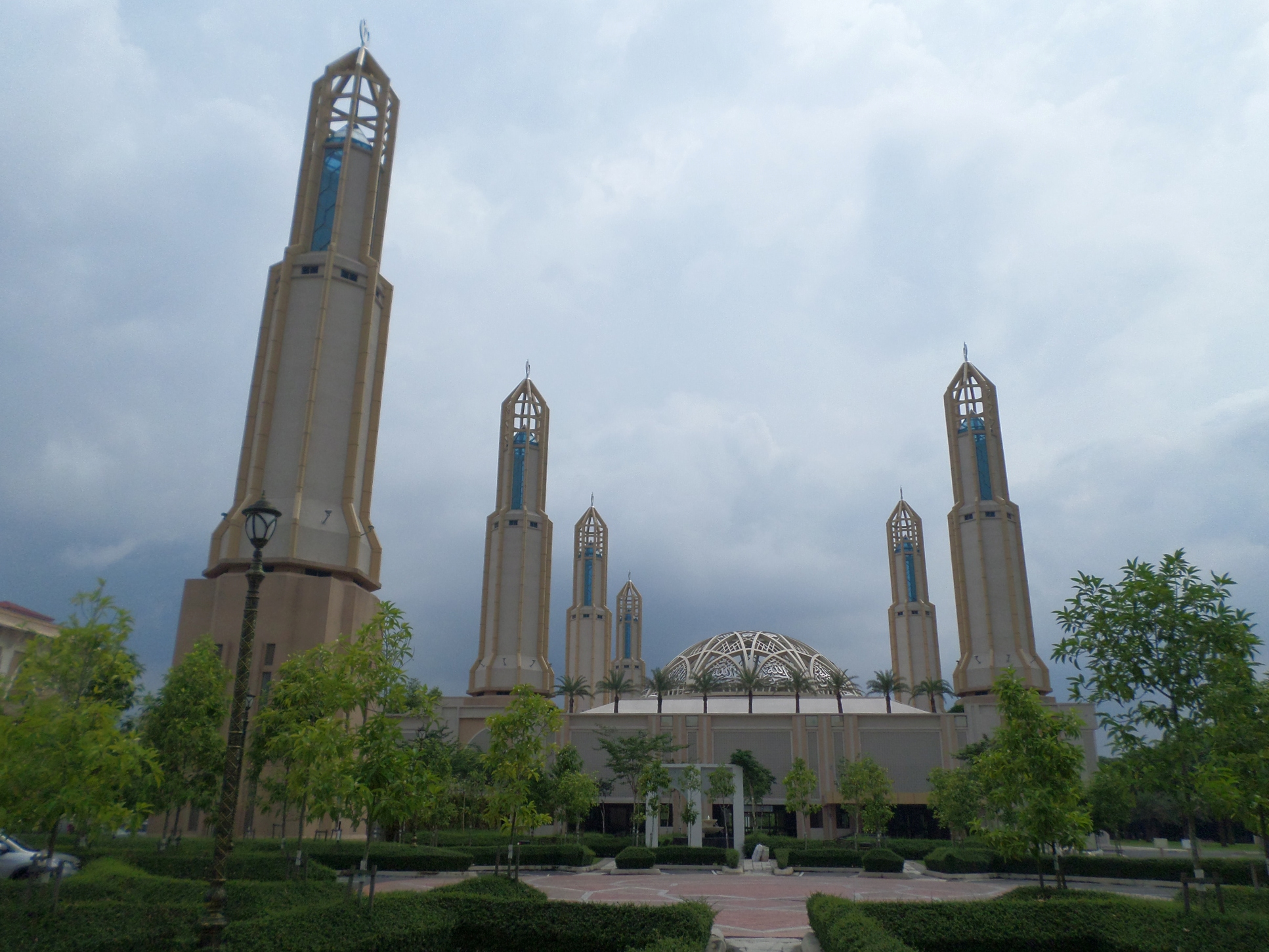
13. Iskandar Puteri, Johor

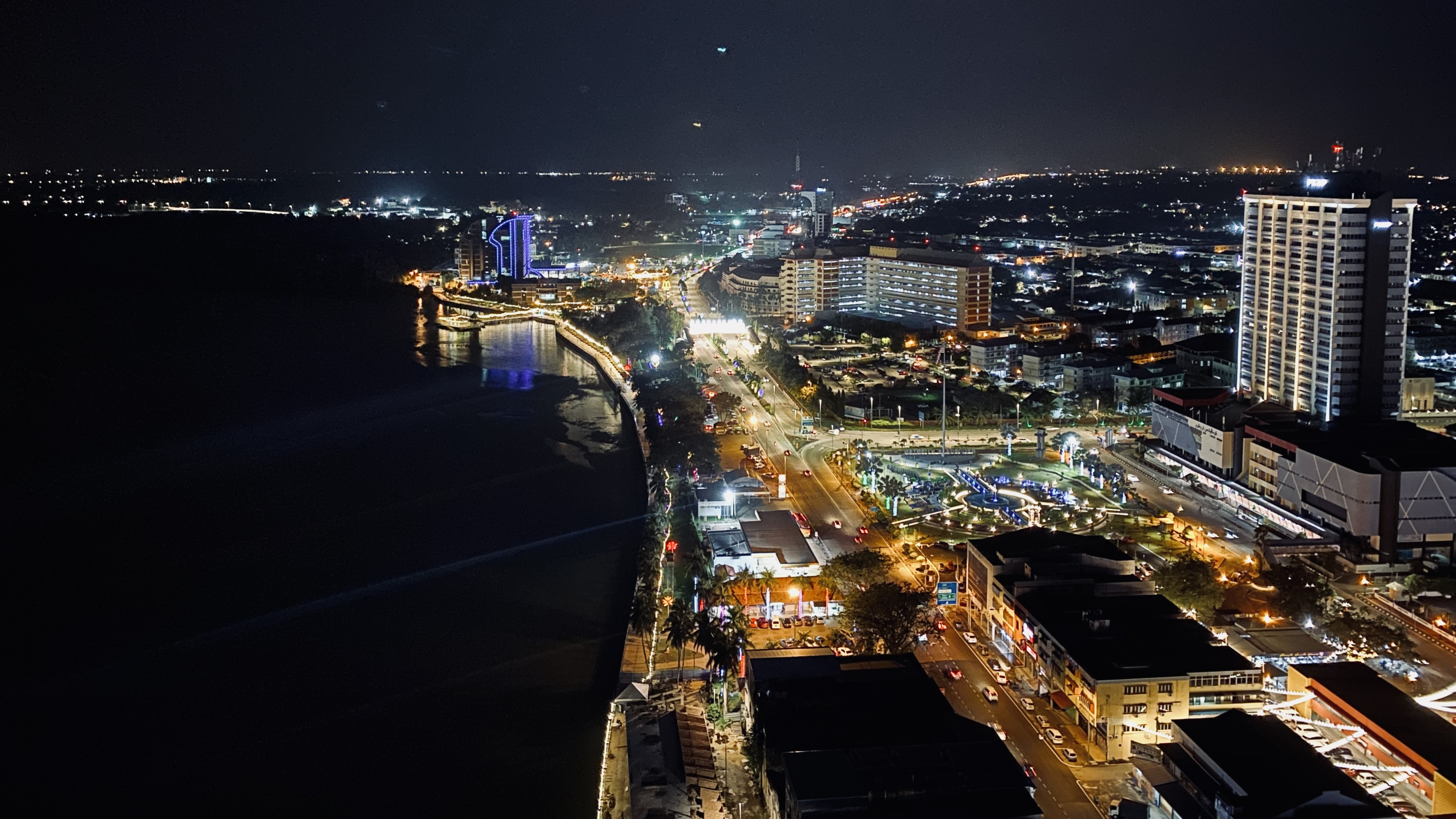
14. Kuantan, Pahang

15. Sungai Petani, Kedah

== Largest metropolitan areas by population ==
The DOSM does not provide any definitions related to metropolitan areas in Malaysia, nor have any statistical calculations that concern build-up areas surrounding an urban centre. However, several major urban regions, such as Greater Kuala Lumpur, the George Town Conurbation and the Johor Bahru Conurbation (Southern Conurbation), have been well-described as metropolitan areas since the early-2010s by local media and government authorities in the latest edition of the National Physical Plan. Despite this, there remains some ambiguity in defining the actual boundaries of other smaller counterparts.

There are 12 metropolitan areas in Malaysia. Perlis and Kelantan are the only states without one. Greater Kuala Lumpur and the George Town Conurbation are the only metropolitan areas that span multiple states (Selangor, Negeri Sembilan, Pahang and Perak; and Penang, Kedah and Perak, respectively). The latter is also the only metropolitan area where the core city is not its most populated settlement (George Town has a population of 794,313, while Seberang Perai has a population of 946,092).

This table displays:

1. The metropolitan area rank by population as of 2020, as estimated with individual local authority population figures by the DOSM;
2. The name of the metropolitan area;
3. The core city of the metropolitan area;
4. The metropolitan area's population as of 2020, as estimated in the 2020 census conducted by the DOSM;
5. The metropolitan area's population as of 2010, as estimated in the 2010 census conducted by the DOSM;
6. The metropolitan area's population difference between 2010 and 2020;
7. The land area of the metropolitan area's defined boundaries in square kilometres (km^{2});
8. The population density of the metropolitan area in people per square kilometres (/km^{2});

List of the largest metropolitan areas in Malaysia by population
| № | Metropolitan area | Core city | DOSM census figures | | | Land area | Density (2020) | Ref. |
| № | Metropolitan area | Core city | 2020 | 2010 | Diff. | Land area | Density (2020) | Ref. |
|---|---|---|---|---|---|---|---|---|
| 1 | Greater Kuala Lumpur (Note: It is sometimes synonymous with the term Klang Valley, though both convey different definitions. Klang Valley is generally recognised to encompass six cities (Klang, Kuala Lumpur, Putrajaya, Petaling Jaya, Shah Alam and Subang Jaya), and five municipalities (Kajang, Selayang, Ampang Jaya, Sepang and Kuala Langat), while Greater Kuala Lumpur (also known as the National Growth Conurbation) covers not only the entire Klang Valley region, but also the outskirts surrounding it such as Hulu Selangor District in Selangor itself, and parts of neighbouring states as in Negeri Sembilan's Malaysia Vision Valley region (Seremban and Port Dickson Districts), parts of Bentong District in Pahang to the east, and Tanjong Malim in southern Perak.) | Kuala Lumpur | 9,085,737 | 7,119,252 | +27.62% | 2,793 km^{2} | 3,062/km^{2} | |
| 2 | George Town Conurbation (Note: The George Town Conurbation comprises two cities (George Town and Seberang Perai), four municipalities (Sungai Petani, Kulim, Bandar Baharu and Yan) and portions of two districts (Kerian and Selama).) | George Town | 2,843,344 | 2,331,180 | +21.97% | 3,765 km^{2} | 756/km^{2} | |
| 3 | Johor Bahru Conurbation (Note: Listed in the latest edition of the National Physical Plan, it includes Johor Bahru, Senai, Skudai, Kulai, Pasir Gudang, Tanjung Pelepas, Pontian, Kota Tinggi, Desaru, Pengerang and Bandar Tenggara.) | Johor Bahru | 2,487,601 | 1,495,098 | +66.38% | 4,954 km^{2} | 502/km^{2} | |
| 4 | Greater Ipoh | Ipoh | 984,586 | 828,174 | +18.89% | 1,988 km^{2} | 495/km^{2} | |
| 5 | Greater Kota Kinabalu | Kota Kinabalu | 949,931 | 855,556 | +11.03% | 3,277 km^{2} | 290/km^{2} | |
| 6 | Greater Kuching | Kuching | 934,515 | 857,110 | +9.03% | 2,031 km^{2} | 460/km^{2} | |
| 7 | Greater Kuantan | Kuantan | 884,754 | 697,788 | +26.79% | 5,211 km^{2} | 170/km^{2} | |
| 8 | Seremban metropolitan (Note: Anchor city of the Malaysia Vision Valley corridor, which is also the southern extension of Greater Kuala Lumpur.) | Seremban | 795,279 | 613,324 | +29.67% | 1,534 km^{2} | 518/km^{2} | |
| 9 | Malacca City metropolitan | Malacca City | 642,761 | 484,885 | +32.56% | 308 km^{2} | 2,087/km^{2} | |
| 10 | Greater Miri | Miri | 546,338 | 502,135 | +8.80% | 5,205 km^{2} | 60/km^{2} | |
| 11 | Alor Setar metropolitan | Alor Setar | 423,868 | 405,523 | +4.52% | 609 km^{2} | 696/km^{2} | |
| 12 | Kuala Terengganu metropolitan | Kuala Terengganu | 375,424 | 337,533 | +11.23% | 605 km^{2} | 621/km^{2} | |

== See also ==
- List of capitals in Malaysia
- List of cities in Malaysia
