= Malaysian Pakistani =

Malaysian Pakistani or Pakistani Malaysian may refer to:

- Malaysia-Pakistan relations
- Malaysians in Pakistan
- Pakistanis in Malaysia
- Mixed race individuals of Malaysian and Pakistani descent
- Multiple citizenship of Malaysia and Pakistan
