= Bangladesh–Malaysia relations =

- Bangladesh: Malaysia

Malaysia has a high commission in Dhaka and Bangladesh one in Kuala Lumpur. Both nations are members of the Commonwealth of Nations, the Organisation of Islamic Cooperation, the Developing 8 Countries and the Non-Aligned Movement. Malaysia was one of the first countries to recognise the independence of Bangladesh in 1971.

Two-way trade between the two countries stood at US$1.19 billion in 2012. Malaysia is also one of the largest foreign investors in Bangladesh.

== History ==
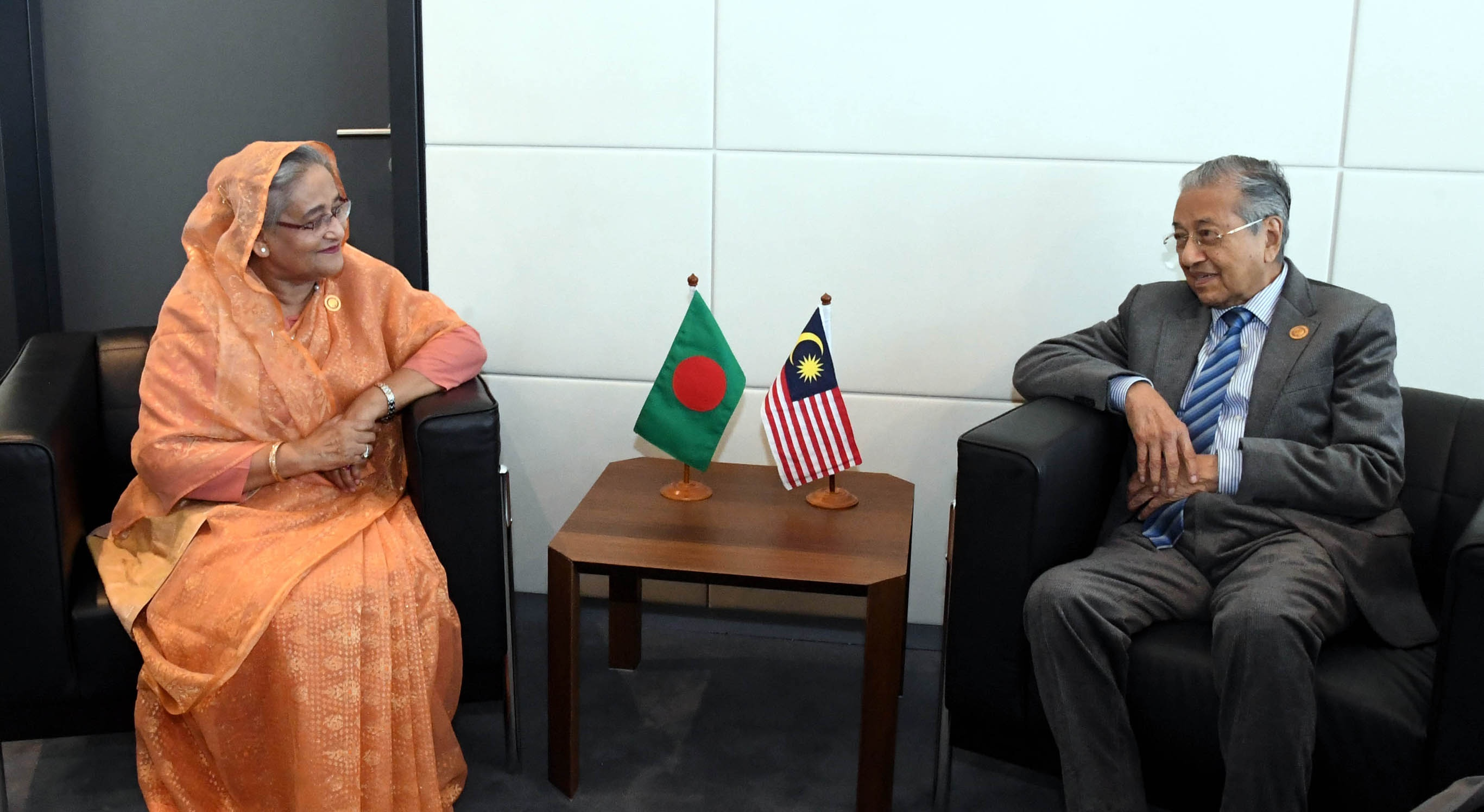
Bangladeshi Prime Minister Sheikh Hasina held a bilateral meeting with Malaysian Prime Minister Mahathir Mohamad at the Baku Convention Center, the venue for the 18th Non-Aligned Movement (NAM) Summit, in Azerbaijan on 25 October 2019

Historically, Portuguese records point to a large number of wealthy Bengali merchants and shipowners residing in the Malacca Sultanate. It is unclear if these merchants were envoys of the Sultan of Bengal. Between 1830 and 1867, Penang was part of the administrative jurisdiction of the Bengal Presidency in the British Empire.

On 24 February 1972, Malaysia, along with its neighbour Indonesia, recognised the independence of Bangladesh, being among the first Muslim countries to do so. In 1999, the Malaysian Prime Minister Mahathir Mohamad visited Bangladesh and in 2000, the Bangladeshi Prime Minister Sheikh Hasina visited Malaysia. Both visits opened up new vistas of co-operation and ensured the continuing export of skilled manpower from Bangladesh to Malaysia.

In 2021, an investigation by an Al Jazeera investigation unit revealed that convicted criminals from Bangladesh with connection to prime minister, Sheikh Hasina, were freely living in Malaysia under fake names and passports.

== Labour issues ==
In 2007, Malaysia banned the imports of Bangladeshi workers into the country after hundreds of them were stranded at an airport because their employers had failed to collect them promptly. This ended in a demonstration in Kuala Lumpur by Bangladeshi workers demanding payments and better working conditions, but was later resolved by both governments. The Malaysian government also placed a similar restriction in 1999 but lifted the ban in 2007 by approving an initial intake of 300,000 workers. There were also cases of Bangladeshi workers committing crimes, including rape and theft. Between 2009 and 2012, Malaysia had stopped hiring workers from Bangladesh but there are still many of the labours enter the country illegally. Until 2013, there are around 320,000 Bangladeshis working on many sectors in the country.

In 2014, the Malaysian cabinet decided to open all sectors apart from plantations in the Malaysian economy for Bangladeshi workers to work.

== Economic relations ==
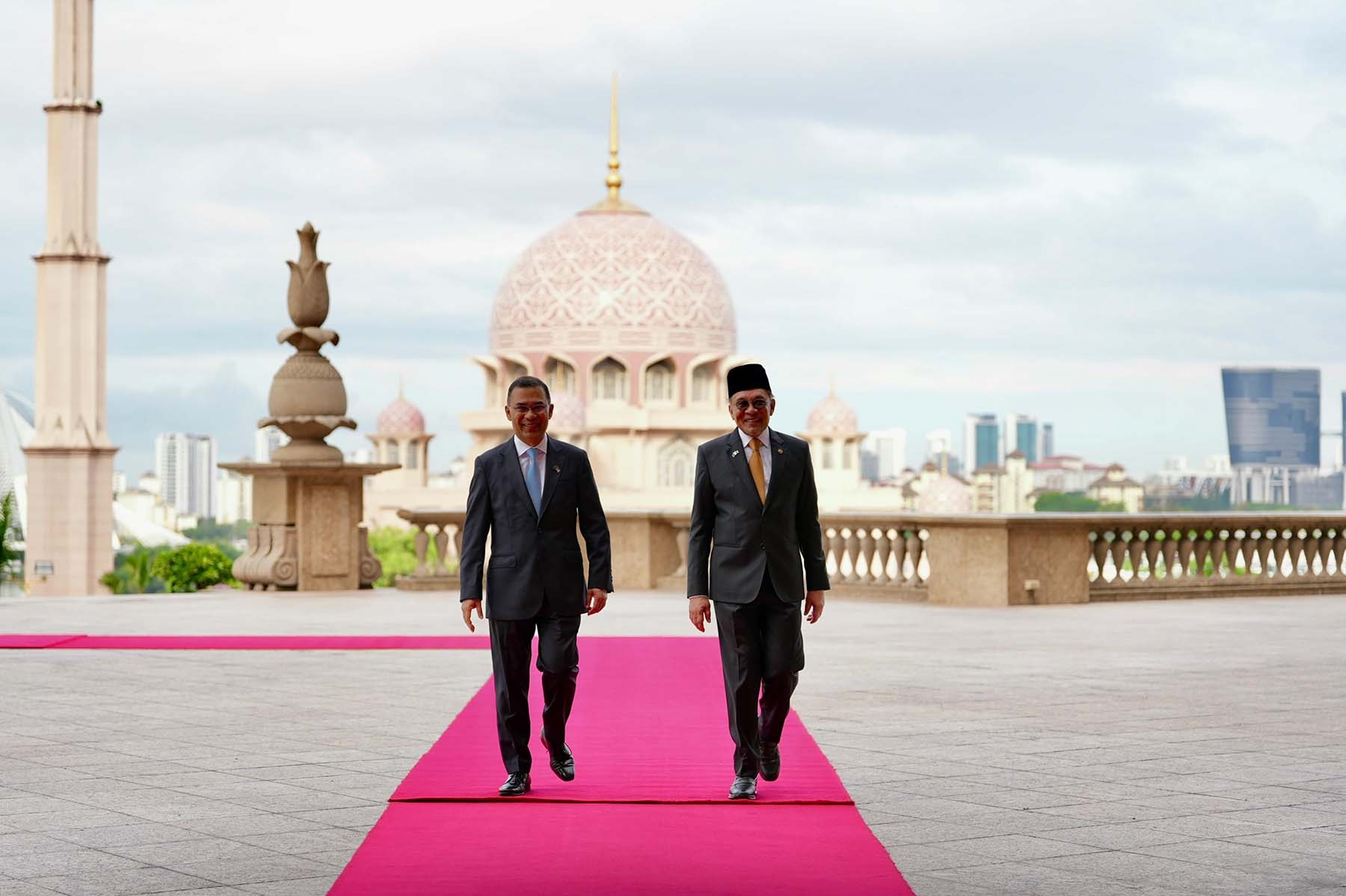
Tarique Rahman and Anwar Ibrahim at Perdana Putra

The bilateral relations between the two countries also enhance the economic sector. In 2012, a memorandum of understanding was signed by both countries to collaborate in the construction of the Padma Bridge, which became the largest bridge in Bangladesh once it was finished. A free trade agreement has also been proposed for both countries to boost the pharmaceutical, garment and tourism sectors of Bangladesh, and infrastructure in Malaysia. Malaysia is also the third largest investment partner in Bangladesh after India and Pakistan, with the Malaysian companies investing in the sectors of telecommunications, power generation, textile and financial sectors which have a combined worth of around MYR558.86 million. Since 2010, Bangladeshi workers in Malaysia have sent home a total of MYR3 billion, which is the highest compared with other workers from Indonesia (MYR2.9 billion), Nepal (MYR1.9 billion), India (MYR625 million) and the Philippines (MYR561 million). The top 5 Malaysian exports to Bangladesh are refined petroleum products, palm oil, chemical products, iron, steel, and electronics, while the major Bangladeshi exports are textiles, apparel, refined petroleum products, vegetables, processed food, seafood, and electronics.

== See also ==
- Bangladeshis in Malaysia
