= Iran–Malaysia relations =

- Iran: Malaysia

Iran–Malaysia relations refers to the current and historical relationship between Iran and Malaysia. Iran has an embassy in Kuala Lumpur, and Malaysia has an embassy in Tehran. Both countries are members of the Organisation of Islamic Cooperation (OIC) and the Non-Aligned Movement (NAM) and have used these forums and bilateral relations to develop political ties.

== History ==
Relations between the two countries have existed since the independence of Malaysia. Persian influences on the Malay Peninsula are much older with traces from some centuries ago as they were once engaged in trade in Lembah Bujang and Malacca together with traces of Persian literature in Malay language.

== Economic relations ==
Both countries have co-operated in a number of large industrial projects, many of them in the energy sector. Earlier in October 2007, Iran and Malaysia were working towards an extensive multilateral oil refinery deal with Venezuela in Syria. In December 2007, the two signed a US$6 billion deal to develop areas of Iran's offshore gas fields.

In January 2017, the two countries are set to pursue a free trade agreement. A memorandum of understanding (MoU) on gas field study was signed in February between National Iranian Oil Company (NIOC) and Malaysia's Bukhary International Ventures (BIV). Both countries have integrated their banking transactions and also agreed to use local currencies along with Chinese yuan and Japanese yen in their bilateral trade. As of 2015, there are around 5,000 Iranian students in Malaysia, while only 15 Malaysian students in Iran.

== Political relations ==
Despite these matters of historical traces, political relations between two countries are recently tense due to alleged Iranian interferences promoting Shi'a Islam in largely Sunni adherence of Malaysia which in response the latter government has passed several anti-Shi'a laws to limit the activities of Shi'a followers in the country to prevent their spread.

== Resident diplomatic missions ==
- Iran has an embassy in Kuala Lumpur.
- Malaysia has an embassy in Tehran.

== See also ==
- Foreign relations of Iran
- Foreign relations of Malaysia
- Iranians in Malaysia
