= Malaysia–Pakistan relations =

- Malaysia: Pakistan

Malaysia–Pakistan relations refer to bilateral foreign relations between the two countries, Malaysia and Pakistan. Pakistan has its high commission (embassy) in Kuala Lumpur, and Malaysia has its high commission in Islamabad. Both countries are members of the Commonwealth of Nations and the Organisation of Islamic Cooperation.

== History ==
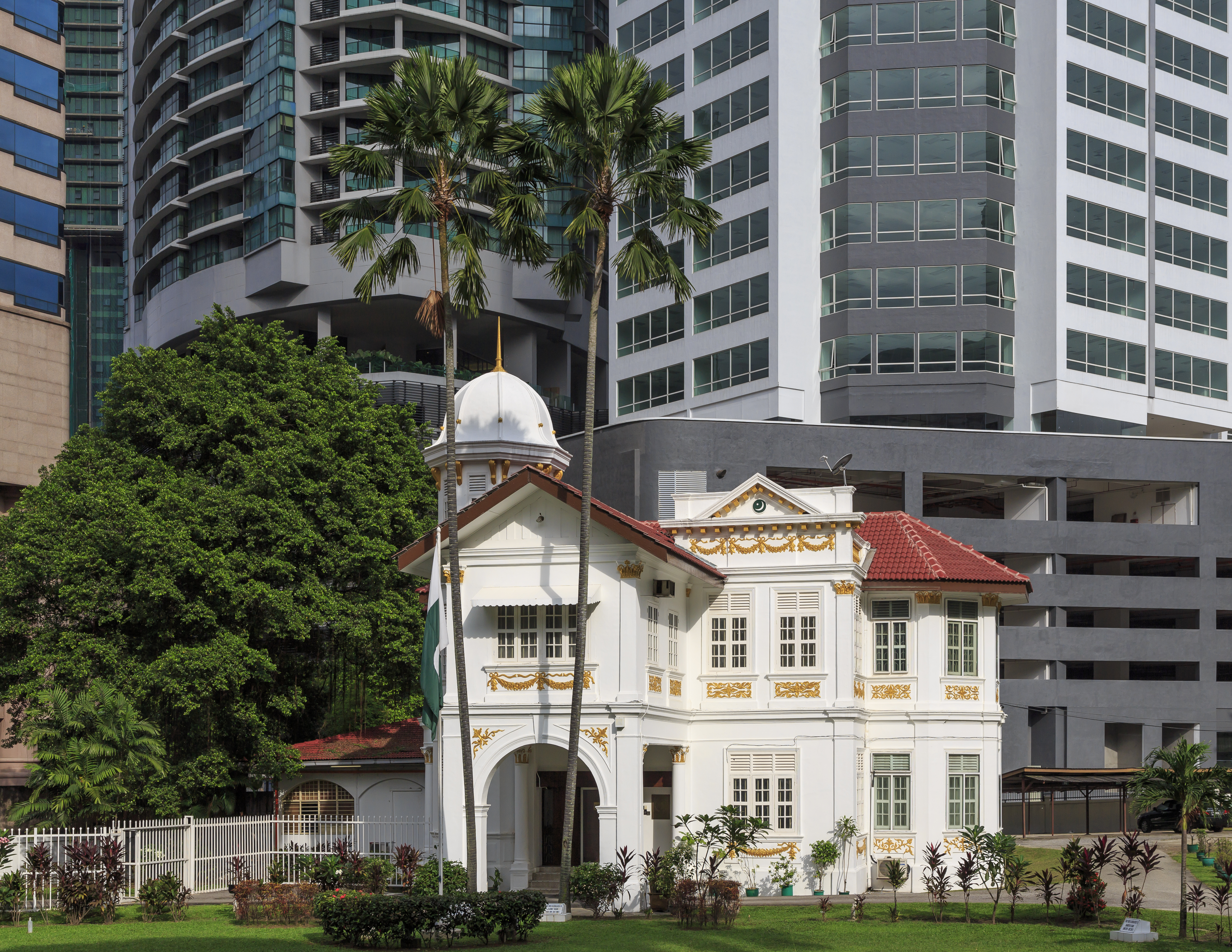
High Commission of Pakistan in Malaysia

Pakistan and Malaysia established their diplomatic relations on 13 August 1957 after the latter's independence. Initially, the High Commission of Malaysia was located in Karachi, which was the capital city of Pakistan then. On 5 October 1965, Pakistan severed diplomatic ties with Malaysia when the Malaysian representative at the UN Security Council (to which Malaysia had been elected in 1965), Radhakrishna Ramani, had taken sides in the Indo-Pakistani war over Kashmir. Pakistan's Foreign Minister Z. A. Bhutto said that Malaysia had taken an immoral position, had violated the solidarity of the African-Asian world." The Malaysian government rejected any Pakistani suggestion that Malaysia had sided with India in the dispute, and sent a note to the Pakistani high commission in Kuala Lumpur that Malaysia had not behaved wrongly to a fellow Muslim nation, challenged a Pakistani claim that Pakistan had tried to mediate the Malaysia-Indonesia dispute".

Shortly after that Malaysia accused Pakistan of being involved in "a sinister pattern of collusion with China and Indonesia against Malaysia". Speaking after a cabinet meeting, the Malaysian Prime Minister Tunku Abdul Rahman said: "I knew this was coming for a long time, and in particular because of the peculiar behaviour of Mr. Bhutto. Mr. Bhutto had given a poor excuse for breaking with Malaysia and what surprises me is that they had not broken off ties with India, with whom they are at war". After 11 months break, the relations was resumed with the help of Iran. When the relations have been normal, Pakistan became a supporter of the Federation of Malaysia which they refused to accept the non-inclusion of Brunei and the leaving of Singapore from the Malaysian Federation, Pakistan only established relations with those countries when Malaysia had done so. In 1968, the High Commission of Malaysia was moved to Islamabad, the new capital. On 2 October 2005, Malaysian Prime Minister Abdullah Ahmad Badawi held out assurance to Pakistani Prime Minister Shaukat Aziz during an hour-long meeting that Malaysia would support Pakistan's bid for a full dialogue partner of the Association of Southeast Asian Nations (ASEAN).

== Diplomatic relations ==
On 21 November 2018, Malaysia and Pakistan agreed to establish bilateral consultations between the two senior officials of their foreign affairs ministries.

== Economic relations ==
In 1986, Malaysia exported $515.5 million worth of goods to Pakistan mainly palm oil while Pakistan export to Malaysia was only $31.1 million. Thus, Pakistan has stated that it wants to explore more joint ventures with Malaysian companies. There is a trade and cultural pact between the two countries, under which the import and export of various goods is done on fairly large scale. The President and the Prime Minister of Pakistan along with other high officials visited Malaysia many times and Malaysian officials also paid a good will visit to Pakistan. Malaysia and Pakistan signed a free trade agreement called the Malaysia–Pakistan Closer Economic Partnership Agreement (MPCEPA) in January 2008.

Pakistan and Malaysia are linked by air transport. Pakistan International Airlines operates many flights from Karachi, Lahore, and Peshawar to Kuala Lumpur.

=== Automotive ===
On 21 March 2019, Proton announced to establish a manufacturing assembly plant in Pakistan, its first in the South Asian region.

==== Investment & Trade ====
On investment, Malaysia is Pakistan's third largest foreign investor behind China and United Kingdom for financial year 2017-2018 according to statistics provided by the State Bank of Pakistan.

In terms of bilateral trade, Malaysia is Pakistan's 16th largest trading partner while Pakistan is Malaysia's largest export market in South Asia and the third for import destination.

	2007		2008		2009		2010		2011		2012		2013		2014		2015		2016		2017	
Malaysia Exports	$1.17 B	▲	$1.72 B	▲	$1.63 B	▼	$2.12 B	▲	$2.63 B	▲	$2.08 B	▼	$1.89 B	▼	$1.29 B	▼	$977 M	▼	$1.03 B	▲	$1.09 B	▲
Pakistan Exports	$114 M	▲	$158 M	▲	$162 M	▲	$162 M	▲	$265 M	▲	$250 M	▼	$232 M	▼	$263 M	▲	$242 M	▼	$216 M	▼	$187 M	▼
Total Trade	$1.17 B	▲	$1.72 B	▲	$1.63 B	▼	$2.12 B	▲	$2.52 B	▲	$2.33 B	▼	$2.12 B	▼	$1.55 B	▼	$1.21 B	▼	$1.24 B	▲	$1.27 B	▲

== Security relations ==
On 18 August 2016, Pakistan Chief of Army Staff General Raheel Sharif arrived in Kuala Lumpur on an official visit. He held separate meetings with Malaysian Chief of Defence Forces General Zulkifeli Mohd Zin and Malaysian Army Chief General Raja Mohamed Affandi. Later, General Raheel also met Malaysian Minister of Defence Hishammuddin Hussein.

=== Malaysia–Pakistan Joint Committee on Defence Cooperation (JCDC) ===
In 1997, Malaysia and Pakistan agreed to set up a Joint Committee on Defense Cooperation exploring collaboration in their military-to-military ties.

=== MALPAK naval exercise ===
On 21 March 2017, Pakistan Navy Ships PNS Nasr and PNS Saif arrived at the Malaysian port of Langkawi to participate in first bilateral naval exercise MALPAK-I. Exercise were carried out in Straits of Malacca.

On 17 February 2019, Royal Malaysian Navy Ships KD Kasturi and KD Mahawangsa arrived in Karachi to participate in the bilateral MALPAK-II exercise. Pakistan Navy's ship PNS Saif, PNS Azmat, long-range maritime aircraft and helicopters participated in the MALPAK-II exercise carried out in Arabian Sea.

=== Military procurement ===
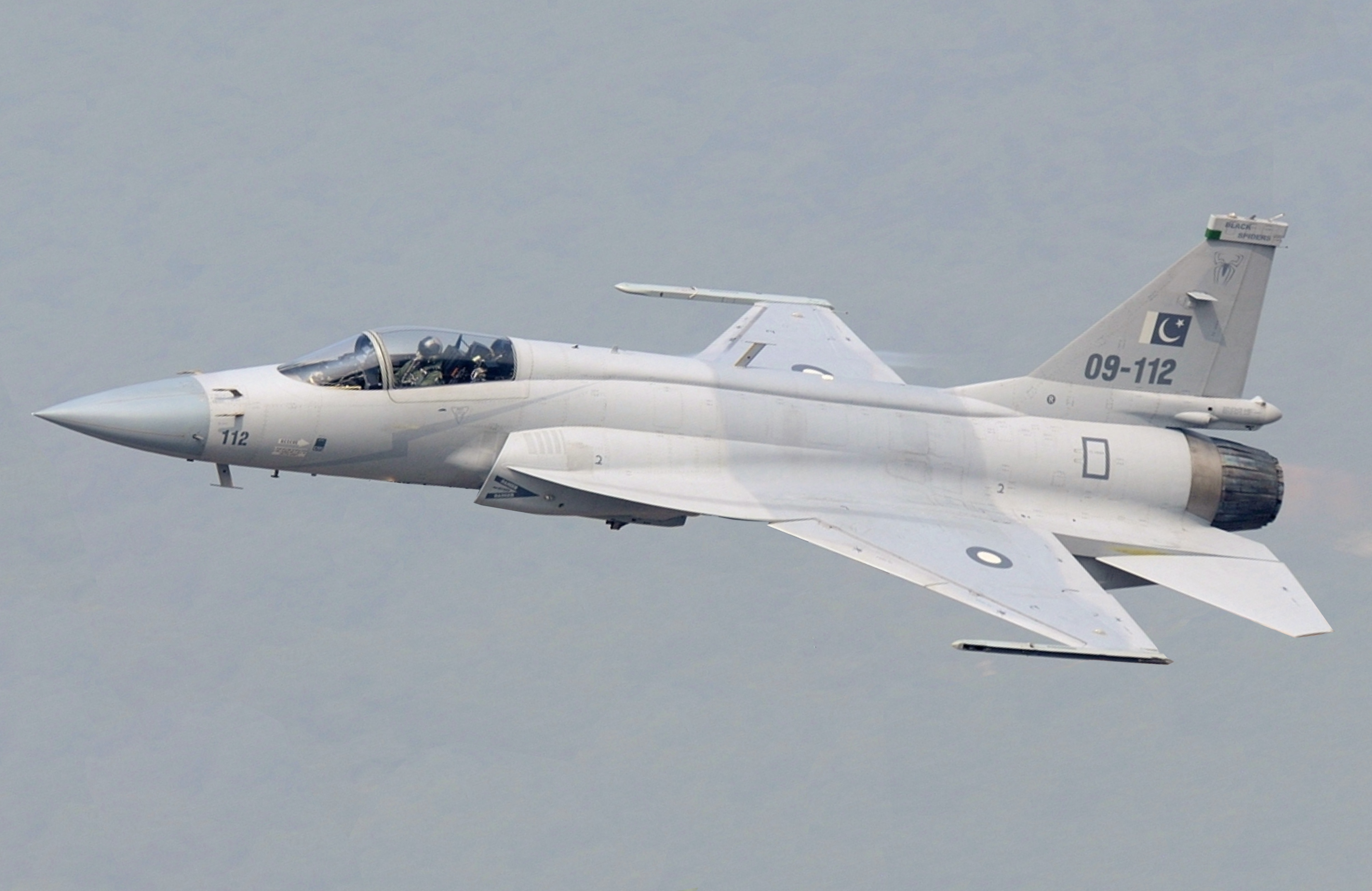
Pakistani JF-17 Thunder fighter jet

Since 2002, several Pakistani made weapons such as Anza and Bakhtar Shikan has been acquired by the Malaysian military as part of the arms deal with Pakistan. On 15 April 2018, it is further reported that Pakistan and Malaysia were in preliminary discussions about the potential export of the Pakistan Aeronautical Complex JF-17 Thunder combat aircraft.

== See also ==
- Pakistanis in Malaysia
- Foreign relations of Malaysia
- Foreign relations of Pakistan
