= Immigration to Malaysia =

Immigration to Malaysia is the process by which people migrate to Malaysia to reside in the country. The majority of these individuals become Malaysian citizens. After 1957, domestic immigration law and policy went through major changes, most notably with the Immigration Act 1959/63. Malaysian immigration policies are still evolving.

In Malaysia there are four categories of immigrants: family class (closely related persons of Malaysian residents living in Malaysia), economic immigrants (skilled workers and business people), other (people accepted as immigrants for humanitarian or compassionate reasons) and refugees (people who are escaping persecution, torture or cruel and unusual punishment).

== History ==
=== Pre-colonial migration ===
For most of human history people were free to move between regions. Malaysia's first generation of migrants consisted of indigenous peoples, the Orang Asli, believed either to have been among the first wave of human migration from Africa around 50,000 years ago, or to belong to the more recent events of Asian human evolution.

The Malay Peninsula enjoyed a position of strategic importance, connecting Indochina and the Indonesian archipelago, on the trade routes from China to India. As a result, it grew from port towns that thrived on trade, and hosted the next groups of migrants as merchants became domiciled in the ports, some settling permanently and assimilating into the local communities. By the 5th century, networks of these towns had evolved into organised political spheres of influence that contemporary historians describe as mandalas, as each was defined by its centre rather than its borders. At the periphery, control is less certain, borders may become permeable, In fact, mandalas sometimes overlapped, where areas could be subject to several powers, or none.

Langkasuka was among the earliest kingdoms founded on the Malay Peninsula, believed to have been founded in the 2nd century. By the 8th century it had come under the control of the powerful Srivijaya empire, that was based on the island of Sumatra (now part of Indonesia). In the 15th century, the centre of power shifted from Sumatra to the Malay Peninsula as the Malacca Sultanate succeeded Srivijaya as the region's dominant influence. In addition to being linked by political rule, Sumatra and the Malay Peninsula were also linked by intermarriage between Sumatran and Peninsular ruling elite, which led to migration of their followers.

Other significant early migrants are those now classified as Melayu Anak Dagang: non-Malays that migrated to the region and later assimilated into Malay culture (contrasted with Melayu Anak Jati: ethnic Malays that are native to the region):

- Minangkabau people from Sumatra, Indonesia. A renowned Malaysian of Minangkabau descent is Tuanku Abdul Rahman, the first Supreme Head of State (Yang di-Pertuan Agong) of the Federation of Malaya (the former government of Peninsular Malaysia).
- Bugis people from Sulawesi, Indonesia. Two renowned Malaysians of Bugis descent are Tun Abdul Razak, the 2nd Prime Minister of Malaysia, and his son Najib Razak, the 6th Prime Minister of Malaysia.

Researcher Anthony Reid draws another conclusion from this history - that Malaysia, like the US and Australia, is best viewed as an immigrant society:

In Malaysia of course official ideology requires that 62% of the population be regarded as 'sons of the soil', defined in racial terms rather than place of birth. But there is also an older pre-nationalist tradition there of understanding Malaya as an immigrant society, and a tendency as in other immigrant societies for the relatively recent migrants in all communities to provide much of the innovative energy and leadership...

=== The colonial era ===
The next wave of migration, by Europeans, was particularly significant as it signaled the beginning of the colonial era. The Portuguese arrived first, setting up in Malacca in 1511, while the English East India Company began operation in 1600, and the Dutch East India Company in 1602. As these Europeans settled in this region, they also married locals and other non-Europeans. The inter-racial marriages account for a new set of people in Malaysia, called the Eurasians. Adding these new groups to the Arab, Chinese, Indian, and Southeast Asian traders who settled, resulted in the urban complexes of Malacca and Penang becoming extraordinarily plural places, with no dominant community up to the mid-19th Century.

Although the colonial powers established 'political' boundaries to demarcate their respective territories, borders were kept open, mainly because of sparse population, and also to encourage immigration and the development of colonial territories.

After the Dutch moved to Indonesia, and with the British acquisitions of Penang (1786), Singapore (1819), Malacca (1824), and British influence in Sarawak (1841) and Sabah (1882), the British became the dominant investor in the region that would become Malaysia.

British colonial immigration policy and goals can be divided into three phases.

During the first phase, 1900–27, the country witnessed the expansion of the tin and rubber industries, along with construction of supporting infrastructure, and the entry of thousands of migrant workers to labor in these enterprises. The immigration rate (immigrants per 1,000 population) of Malaya (Peninsula Malaysia and Singapore) was the highest in the world throughout the period 1881-1939, more than ten times the rate of the United States. For Chinese, Indian and Indonesian, entry was completely free and unrestricted.

While Chinese, Indian, and Javanese migrants were often fleeing destitution caused by overpopulation, landlessness, or political turmoil, the indigenous people and Malays generally were not subject to these hardships. Thus, they were not receptive to working as wage labourers for the British colonizers. This meant the colonizers could not meet their aggressive goals of resource exploitation with existing stock of labour, leading them to invite/attract more migrant workers. Under the British colonial administration a divide and rule policy kept the immigrant workers apart from each other, and from the indigenous population, with the local Malays and the Indonesians confined to the rural areas as peasant farmers, the Indians mainly employed as wage labour in the plantations and in the infrastructure construction sectors, while the Chinese worked in the tin mines and in trade and commerce in the urban areas. This pattern of economic and geographical segregation continued to linger on in post-colonial Malaysia, as a legacy of colonial rule.

The second phase, during 1928–46, began when the colonial government enacted its first piece of restrictive legislation: the Immigration Restriction Ordinance. This legislation enabled the government to establish a basic framework for border controls, and empowered it with the means to control the entry of labor deemed surplus to the requirements of the country. The Great Depression brought rising unemployment and depressed economic conditions, forcing the closure of some mines and rubber estates. This prompted the government to impose a monthly quota on adult Chinese male immigration from August 1930. In January 1933 the Immigration Restriction Ordinance was replaced by the Aliens Ordinance. The Aliens Ordinance provided the colonial state with a mechanism for registering aliens resident in Malaya and represented an important stage in the development of statutes and measures to monitor immigrants in Malaya.

During the third phase, 1947–57, the Aliens Ordinance was replaced by the Immigration Ordinance of 1953. This Ordinance, coinciding with rising Malay nationalist sentiment, resulted in even more stringent border controls and laid down for the first time the specific composition of migrants allowed entry into Malaya, restricting by nationality and occupation, and thus placed greater emphasis on the skills of the migrants. New stipulations required potential immigrants to have job contracts of at least two years with Malayan firms and set a minimum earnings requirement.

Finally, the Malayan Emergency (1948–60) resulted in the introduction of the Internal Security Act (ISA), and a compulsory system of identification cards for all residents aged twelve years and over. The identity cards categorized people on the basis of their nationality and residential/occupational status and, in effect, created the 'outsider'. This an enduring legacy of colonial rule, adapted to the needs of the national state.

=== Post-colonial migration ===
Having experienced net emigration between 1952 and 1979, Malaysia registered positive net immigration in 1980 and, as of 2023, has done so in each year since. As of 2025, 3.38 million residents of Malaysia (9.9 per cent of the total population) were non-citizens.

== See also ==
- Ministry of Foreign Affairs (Malaysia)
- Immigration Department of Malaysia
- Malaysia My Second Home
- National Integrated Immigration System
- Malaysian diaspora
- Project IC
