= Punjabi Malaysians =

Panjābī Malā'iśiyā'ī
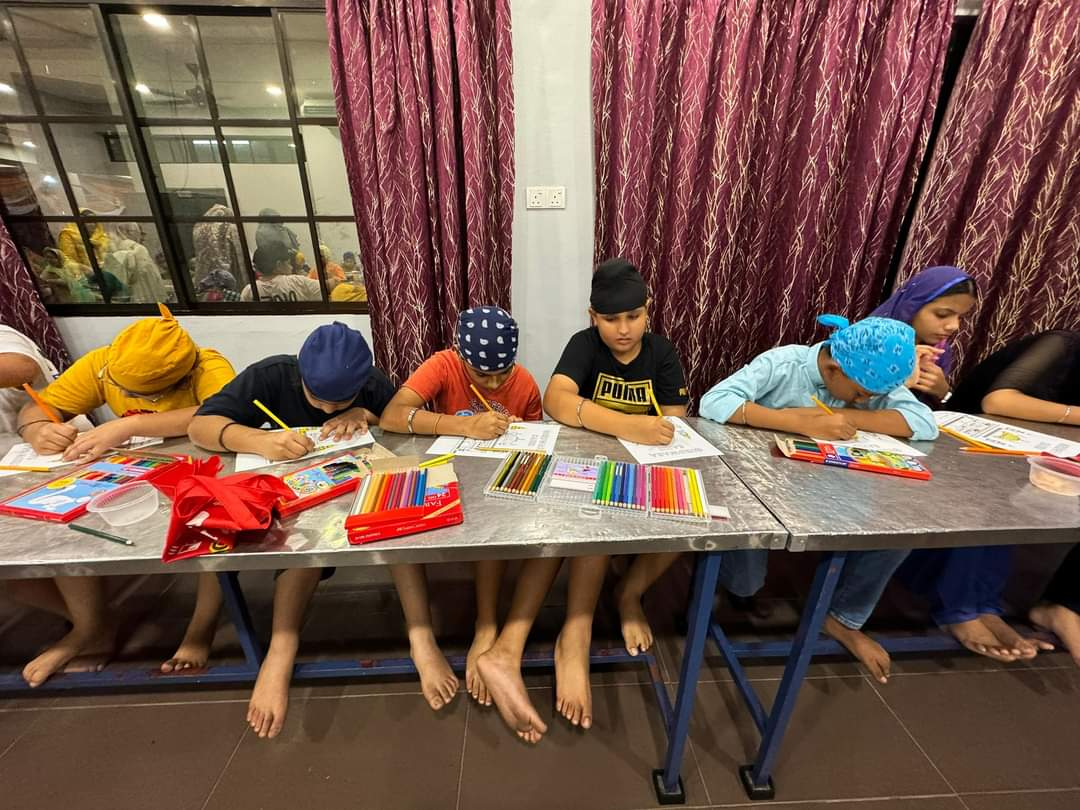
- A group of local Punjabi kids in Ipoh, Perak

Total population
- 100,000 (2010)

Regions with significant populations
- Peninsular Malaysia

Languages
- Punjabi · Hindi · Malay · English · Tamil

Religion
- Sikhism · Islam · Hinduism · Christianity

Related ethnic groups
- Malaysian Indians · Malaysian Pakistanis

Punjabi Malaysians are people of full or partial Punjabi descent who were born in or immigrated to Malaysia. Originating from the Punjab region of present-day India and Pakistan, Punjabi immigration to Malaysia began in the 19th century from what was then British India to British Malaya. The Punjabi Malaysian community today numbers over 100,000 – the majority of whom are Sikhs, although there are also sizeable Muslim, Hindu and Christian minorities. They form the largest Punjabi diaspora group in Southeast Asia, while within Malaysia, Punjabis are the fourth largest ethnicity of Indian or South Asian descent after the Tamils, Malayalis and Telugus.

== Demographics ==
Punjabis were brought to Malaysia in the mid-19th century, when both the Indian subcontinent and Malaysia were under British colonial rule. The earliest Punjabi arrivals included political prisoners from British India, as well as those recruited by the British to serve in the paramilitary and police forces in both Peninsular and East Malaysia, owing to their characterisation as a martial race. They were primarily men and largely composed of Sikhs, who established the foundations of Sikhism in Malaysia. Upon the completion of their service, many of these Punjabis returned to the subcontinent. Amongst the men who remained, those who were Muslims married local women and integrated into Malay society. With the expansion of the community, the second wave of Punjabi settlers included farmers, merchants, tradespeople, hawkers and those in the transportation business.

In the census of 1947, the Punjabi population in Malaysia numbered 30,592 – constituting by far the largest ethnicity from the northern part of the subcontinent settled in Malaysia. During the 1990s, they numbered anywhere from 30,000 to 60,000 individuals. Today, their population is considered to approach or be well in excess of 100,000. Punjabis are considered well-represented in multiple spheres of Malaysia's economy, in particular as professionals, in the academia and civil service, and in the mercantile and money-lending business. The Punjabi Party of Malaysia (PPM) was founded in 1986 and formally registered in 2003 to advance the political interests of the Malaysian Punjabi, and in particular, Sikh community.

The regions with the largest concentration of Malaysian Punjabis include the Klang Valley, Perak and Penang.

== Notable people ==
- Mohinder Singh Amar, field hockey player
- Melinder Bhullar, model
- Jagjit Singh Chet, field hockey player
- Gobind Singh Deo, politician
- Jagdeep Singh Deo, politician
- Satwant Singh Dhaliwal, biologist
- Faezah Elai, actress
- Avtar Singh Gill, field hockey player
- Ranjit Singh Gurdit, field hockey player
- Kiran Jassal, model
- Anita Raj Kaur, badminton player
- Sukhvinderjeet Singh Kulwant, field hockey player
- Sarjit Singh Kyndan, field hockey player
- Maninderjit Singh Magmar, field hockey player
- K. S. Nijhar, politician
- Aphthar Singh Piara, field hockey player
- Nauraj Singh Randhawa, athlete
- B. S. Rajhans, film director
- Harinder Singh Sekhon, sportsman
- Harnahal Singh Sewa, field hockey player
- Kavita Sidhu, model
- Nashatar Singh Sidhu, javelin thrower
- Tara Singh Sindhu, field hockey player
- Baljit Singh (b. 1986), field hockey player
- Baljit Singh (b. 1987), field hockey player
- Baljit Singh Jigiri Singh, politician
- Gian Singh, field hockey player
- Jagdish Singh, badminton player
- Kalwant Singh, drug trafficker
- Karamjit Singh, rally driver
- Karpal Singh, politician and lawyer
- Keshvinder Singh, politician
- Lall Singh, Test cricketer
- Manrick Singh, cricketer
- Pavandeep Singh, cricketer
- Ramkarpal Singh, politician
- Sanjay Singh, squash player
- Santokh Singh, football player
- Savinder Singh, field hockey player
- Shebby Singh, football player
- Suresh Singh, cricketer
- Virandeep Singh, cricketer
- Sanjna Suri, model
- Kuldip Singh Uijeer, field hockey player
- Ghulam-Sarwar Yousof, academic

== See also ==
- Malaysian Indians
- Pakistanis in Malaysia
- Sikhism in Malaysia
