= Bangladeshis in Malaysia =

মালয়েশিয়ায় বাংলাদেশি
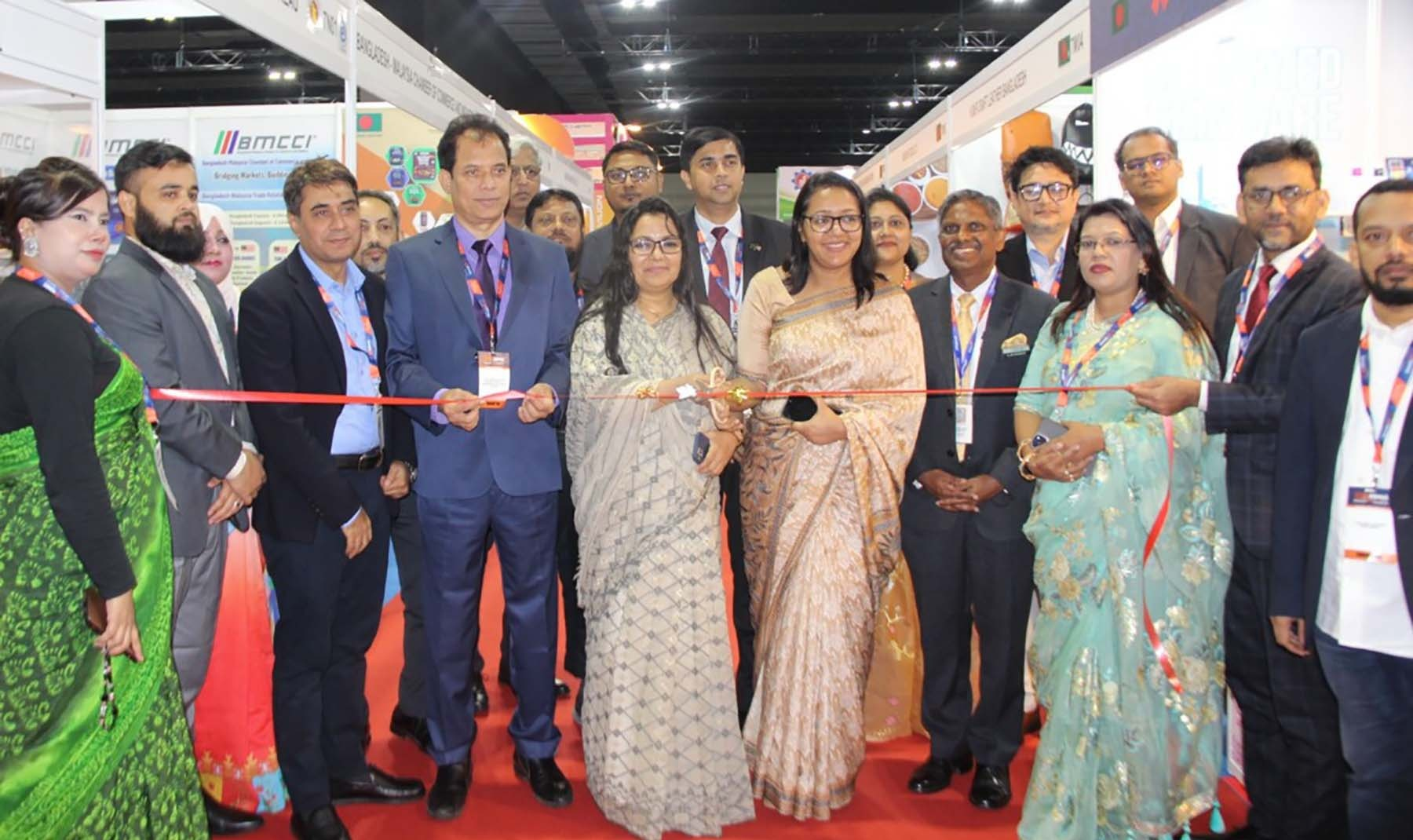
- Inauguration of the Bangladesh Pavilion at the Malaysia International Halal Showcase in Kuala Lumpur, Malaysia

Total population
- 898,970 (2025 est.)

Regions with significant populations
- Peninsular Malaysia

Languages
- Bengali, Malaysian, English

Religion
- Islam and Hinduism

Related ethnic groups
- Bangladeshi diaspora

Bangladeshis in Malaysia are members of the Bangladesh diaspora who currently reside in Malaysia. Bangladeshis in Malaysia form a large proportion of Malaysia's foreign labour force. Their population was estimated to total 898,970 persons, roughly one-third of all the foreign workers in Malaysia as of December 2024. In early 2016, a controversial agreement by Bangladeshi Prime Minister Sheikh Hasina was signed to send a total of 1.5 million Bangladeshi workers in stages for 3 years to Malaysia. This decision was met with criticism from both individuals in government and the general Malaysian public and was quickly revoked.

== Migration history ==
Bengali people have long established in Malaysia, history record demonstrated that the traders from the Bay of Bengal had been involved in commercial activities in the Sultanate of Malacca in the 15th-16th century.

During the colonial era, both British Malaya and the Strait Settlements received Bengali-speaking communities bought by the British from the Bengal Presidency that constitute modern-day Bangladesh (from East Bengal of British India) and West Bengal (of the Republic of India). The mass arrival from Bengal correlated with the larger migration from British India to work with the colonial government and companies. Many of them consist of traders, policemen, coolies, plantation labourers and colonial soldiers. This pioneer migration are largely taken place from the late 18th century to the 1930s. Today, there are estimated that around 230,000 people of Bengali ancestry in Malaysia. Among the legacy of the pioneers is the Bengali Mosque in Penang which was built in 1803.

The first migrant workers from modern-day Bangladesh are believed to have been a group of 500 who came in 1986 to work on plantations; the two countries concluded a governmental-level agreement on manpower exports in 1992, following which migration expanded sharply. Bangladesh is one of five countries, along with Indonesia, Pakistan, the Philippines, and Thailand, which have such agreements with Malaysia for manpower exports. As of 1999, official figures record 385,496 Bangladeshis as having gone to Malaysia for work, of whom roughly 229,000 were in the country at that time, forming 12% of all Bangladeshi workers overseas. This figure was roughly comparable to the numbers in Kuwait and the United Arab Emirates, but much smaller than the number in Saudi Arabia, the top destination, where roughly one million resided. Remittances from Malaysia to Bangladesh amounted to roughly US$5 million in 1993, but grew eleven times to US$57 million by 1999.

Construction workers form a large proportion of Bangladeshi migrant workers. From July 1992 until December 1995, of 89,111 Bangladeshis issued temporary work passes, 26,484, or 29.7%, worked in construction, forming one-fifth of all workers in the construction sector in Malaysia and making them the second-largest group behind Indonesians. 91.4% were first-time migrants, who had never previously worked abroad. Surveys showed between 6.4% and 14.9% admitted to working illegally, without proper employment authorisation or travel documents.

A scandal arose in 1996 when it became known that Bangladeshi consular officials in Kuala Lumpur had overcharged at least 50,000 workers applying for passport renewal by RM200-300, thus appropriating RM10-15 million for themselves. The situation resulted in many Bangladeshi workers becoming undocumented, and Bangladesh's government later came to an agreement with the Malaysian authorities to redress the situation and issue fresh passports to those affected. However, none of the officials concerned were penalised. The following year, an amnesty was offered under which 150,000 illegal workers were able to regularise their status.

== See also ==
- Bangladesh–Malaysia relations
- Bangladeshi diaspora
- Immigration to Malaysia
