= 2010 Malaysian census =

Census of the population of Malaysia

Population and Housing Census of Malaysia, 2010
6 July–22 August 2010

General information
- Country: Malaysia

Results
- Total population: 28,334,135 (▲2.0%)
- Most populous state / federal territory: Selangor (5,462,141)
- Least populous state / federal territory: Putrajaya (72,413)

The Population and Housing Census of Malaysia, 2010, was conducted by Department of Statistics from 6 July to 22 August 2010. It was carried out in three phases; the first phase from 6 to 21 July, the second phase from 22 July to 6 August, and the third phase from 6 to 22 August. To ensure a complete coverage, mapping-out activities were undertaken at the end of each phase. All persons living in private living quarters, collective living quarters such as college or university hostels, charitable or social welfare institutions, prisons, and shelters for homeless persons; were enumerated based on their usual place of residence in Malaysia on the Census Day that is 6 July 2010.

== See also ==
- Census in Malaysia
