= Iranians in Malaysia =

Total population
- 100,000 (2013)

Regions with significant populations
- Kuala Lumpur, Ampang, Mont Kiara, Penang

Languages
- Persian, Malay, English

Religion
- Predominantly Shia Islam · minority Sunni Islam and Sufism

Related ethnic groups
- Iranian diaspora, Persian people

Iranians in Malaysia form a diverse diaspora community in Southeast Asia, comprising students, expatriates, business owners, and a smaller number of refugees and asylum seekers.

== History ==
=== Early presence ===
Persian contact with the Malay Peninsula dates to maritime trade during the Sassanid era (224–651 CE), expanding after the arrival of Islam. Persian merchants exchanged spices and luxury goods at Malayan ports. Under the Malacca Sultanate, Persian traders integrated into the elite, introducing the title Shahbandar (harbor master). Persian linguistic influence remains in the Malay language through loanwords such as pasar (market), dewan (hall), and nakhoda (ship captain).

=== Modern migration ===
Modern migration surged after the 1979 Islamic Revolution and the Iran–Iraq War, with professionals and refugees moving to Malaysia, attracted by its visa-free entry policy for Iranian nationals. A second wave followed the 2009 Green Movement protests; activists and students used Malaysia as a transit point to the West.

== Demographics ==
In 2011, the Iranian embassy estimated the community at 70,000. By 2013, the number had risen to approximately 100,000, according to the Middle East Institute. Some later academic assessments have placed the figure higher, though reliable data is limited due to the transient nature of student and business visas. Students form the largest segment of the community, followed by business owners and entrepreneurs. Naturalisation is uncommon; as Christoph Marcinowski of the Middle East Institute observed, "it is very difficult for any foreign-born national, including Iranians, to obtain Malaysian citizenship". A small population of Iranian refugees and asylum seekers—fewer than 500 as of 2023—is registered with the UNHCR in Malaysia.

== Socio-economic contributions ==
As of 2011, Iranians held shares in more than 2,000 Malaysian businesses. In the same year, Iran exported approximately $500 million in goods to Malaysia, and 130,000 Iranian tourists visited the country. Many community members participate in the Malaysia My Second Home (MM2H) programme; Iranians formed the largest national group of MM2H participants from 2008 to 2010.

== Culture and religion ==
The community is predominantly Shia Muslim, with a minority of Sunni and Sufi adherents. In 1996, Malaysia's National Fatwa Committee issued a religious ruling branding Shia Islam as "deviant" and prohibited its propagation. As a result, religious observances such as Ashura are often conducted discreetly in private homes or rented halls. Major cultural festivals include Nowruz (Persian New Year) and Yalda Night, which are celebrated at venues such as the Iranian Cultural Centre in Kuala Lumpur.

== Challenges ==
Iranians in Malaysia face banking restrictions resulting from U.S. sanctions against Iran, which have led Malaysian banks to close or freeze Iranian accounts, complicating the payment of tuition fees and living expenses. In 2013, Malaysia suspended its visa‑on‑arrival policy for Iranian nationals at the request of Australia, though a 14‑day visa‑free entry was later reinstated. In September 2025, the governments of Iran and Malaysia agreed to extend the visa‑free eligibility period for citizens of both countries to 30 days, effective 3 September 2025. Sectarian tensions related to Shia practices have also posed ongoing difficulties for the community.

== Notable individuals ==
- Asghar Yaghoubi – Iranian sculptor and founder of the Cube Gallery in Kuala Lumpur (2008), the first Iranian‑owned art space in Southeast Asia.
- Pegah Jahangiri – Iranian visual artist and doctoral student at the University of Malaya, known for blending Persian motifs with Malaysian batik techniques.
- Hussain Najadi (1938–2013) – Banker of Persian descent who founded the Arab Malaysian Banking Group in 1975, a pioneering figure in Malaysia's financial sector.

== See also ==
- Iran–Malaysia relations
- Iranian diaspora
- Immigration to Malaysia
