= Malaysian people of European descent =

Ethnic people

Malaysian people of European descent are less than .1% of the population, but the British Empire had ruled Malay Peninsula for over a hundred years.

== Notable people ==
- David Rowley
- Diana Danielle
- Farish A. Noor
- Julia Rais
- Julia Ziegler
- Matthew Davies
- Quentin Cheng
- Stuart Wark
- Stuart Wilkin
- Sarkies Brothers
