= Timorese in Malaysia =

Malaysians of East Timorese origin
Total population
- Hundreds

Regions with significant populations
- Johore, Sabah

Languages
- Malay, Indonesian, Tetun and Portuguese

Religion
- Roman Catholicism, Protestant, Islam

Related ethnic groups
- Demographics of East Timor, other ethnic groups in Indonesia

The East Timorese Malaysians or Florenese Malaysians consists of people of full or partial Timorese descent who were born in or immigrated to Malaysia. Timorese in Malaysia consist mainly of Timorese formerly resident in Indonesian West Timor as well as recent migrants from East Timor. Most of the Timorese arrived following the occupation of East Timor by Indonesia. Most of these Timorese reside in the state of Sabah especially on the east coast area of Tawau Division with some of them intermarried with the local peoples.

== Relations between the state of Sabah and East Timor ==
Since the independence of East Timor from Indonesia, the first President of East Timor Xanana Gusmão has paid a visit to the state of Sabah on a working visit and to see the Timorese communities there.

== See also ==
- East Timor–Malaysia relations
