= Indonesian citizens in Malaysia =

Indonesians in Malaysia
Total population
- estimated 2,000,000 (2013)

Regions with significant populations
- Nationwide less population in Terengganu and Kelantan

Languages
- Indonesian; Malay; and other Indonesian languages

Religion
- Islam; Christianity; Buddhism; Hinduism

Related ethnic groups
- Indonesian diaspora

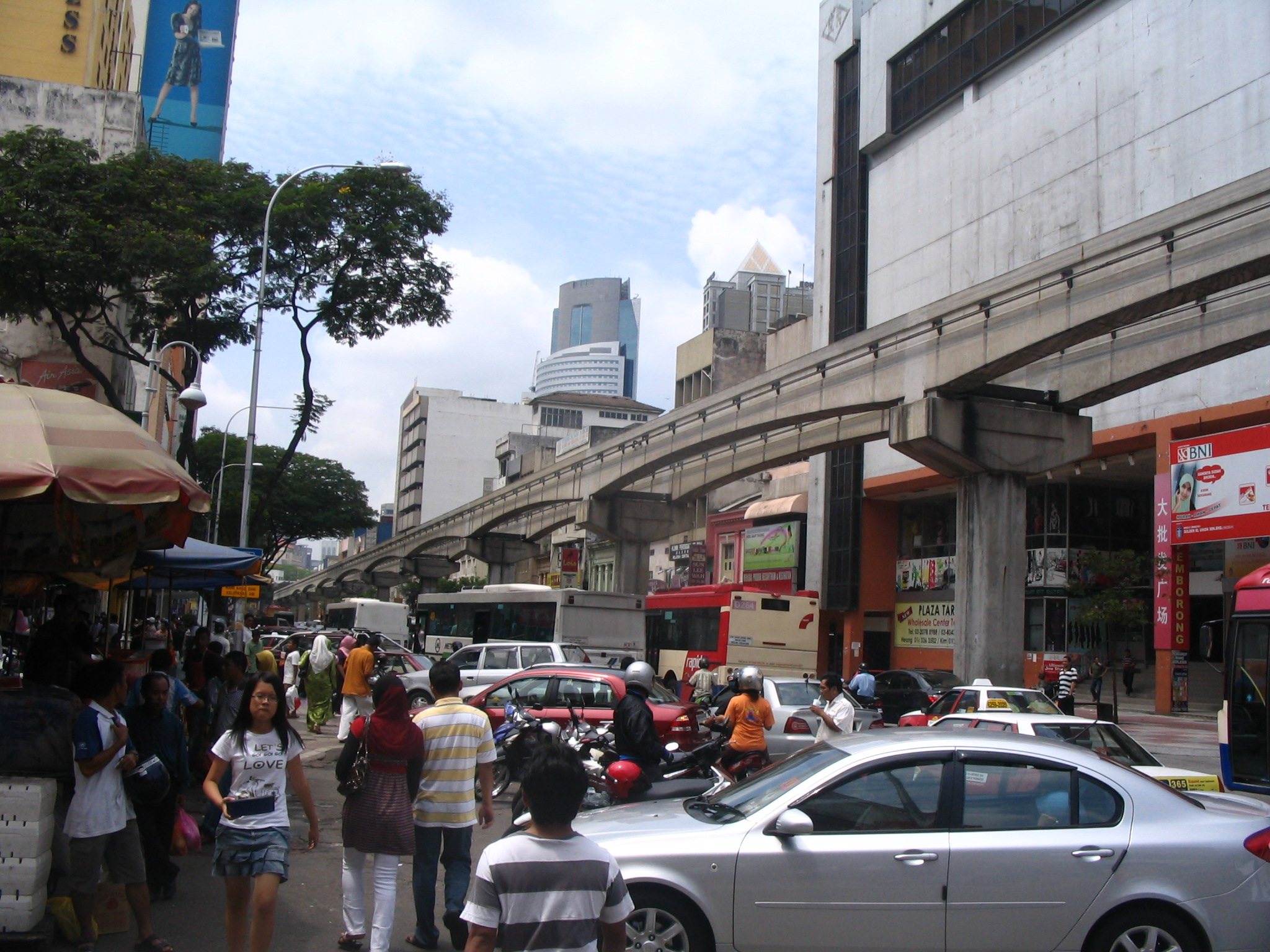
Chow Kit, area that features a large Indonesian community in Kuala Lumpur.

Indonesian citizens in Malaysia are Indonesian citizens who live and work in Malaysia. Indonesians in Malaysia comprised a large numbers of labour and domestic workers. It is estimated that 83 percent of migrant workers in Malaysia are Indonesian.

== History ==
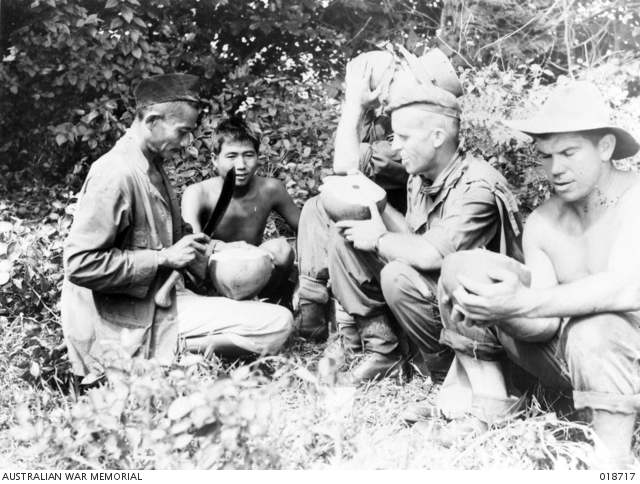
Native Indonesians in Labuan Island, British Borneo (present-day Malaysia) serving coconut water to Australian troops as a gratitude during the Battle of Labuan to recapture the island from the Japanese.

The migration of Indonesian to Malaysia can be traced back since before the colonial time especially during the Srivijaya and Majapahit empires. Interracial marriages between Sultanates such as between Sultan Mansur Shah of Malacca and the Princess Raden Galuh Chandra Kirana of Majapahit are stated in the Malay Annals. Other historical texts such as Tuhfat al-Nafis (known as Sejarah Melayu dan Bugis (History of the Malays and Bugis)), stated the relations between different Sultanates of Johor-Riau, Kedah, Perak, Selangor, Pahang, and Terengganu on the peninsula with the east and west coasts of Sumatra and Kalimantan.

As the British assumed control over the whole territory of the present-day Malaysia during the colonial period, Malaysia was integrated into world commodity and capital markets, became the provider of resources for its coloniser (suzerain) and began to facing the shortage of labour workers. The British then searching for labour source from countries like India and China. The Javanese became the third labour source and the British viewed and treated them different from the Indian and Chinese as they were regarded as origination from the same racial stock as the Malays. A pattern of differential treatment for migrants based on ethnicity was thus established, which was to have major implications for labour migration into Malaya after independence in 1957. The flow of Indonesian migrant workers to the West Malaysia experienced a sharp increase in the 1930s. The results of the 1950 Malaysian population census indicated that there were 189,450 people born in the Island of Java, 62,200 people originated from South Kalimantan, 26,300 people from Sumatra, 24,000 people from the Island of Bawean (East Java), and another 7,000 people from Sulawesi. The movement received a declined following the war between the two countries but rise again when the relationship been improved. The movement then saw a significant rise in the 1970s following the implementation of the New Economic Policy in Malaysia.

== Cultures-influenced ==
As there is a huge intermarriage and connection between peoples in both countries, culture spread are not an unusual thing in Malaysia despite national sentiments issue and accusation by neighbouring Indonesia over the alleged stealing of culture. For example, most Indonesian influenced food heritage such as Amplang, Ayam penyet, Bakso, Botok botok, Bubur pedas, Lontong, Nasi kuning, Pecal, Rempeyek, Rendang and Telur pindang are very popular in Malaysia since been introduced by their own peoples even before the colonial period when the cultural exchange was happen.

== See also ==
- Indonesia–Malaysia relations
- Malaysians of Indonesian descent
