= Africans in Malaysia =

Demographic in Malaysia

African Malaysians
Orang Melayu Afrika (Malay)

Total population
- N/Av

Regions with significant populations
- Johor · Kuala Lumpur · Negeri Sembilan · Penang · Perak · Selangor · Sabah · Sarawak

Languages
- Malay · French · Arabic · English · Languages of Africa (Igbo, Yoruba)

Religion
- Islam · Christianity

Related ethnic groups
- African people

Africans in Malaysia or African Malaysians, are people of full or partial African descent who were born in or immigrated to Malaysia. Immigration from Africa to Malaysia is only a recent phenomenon, with Europe and the rest of Asia traditionally being the largest sources of migration to Malaysia.

Globalization brought more Africans to Malaysia for tourism, business and to study at Malaysian universities. Medical tourism has also attracted Africans to Malaysia. Immigration of Africans to Malaysia and other Asian countries has become increasingly common due to tighter restrictions on immigration in Europe.

In 2012, around 79,352 Africans entered Malaysia legally. They were issued with a total of 25,467 student visas.
