= Pakistanis in Malaysia =

Pakistani diaspora in Malaysia

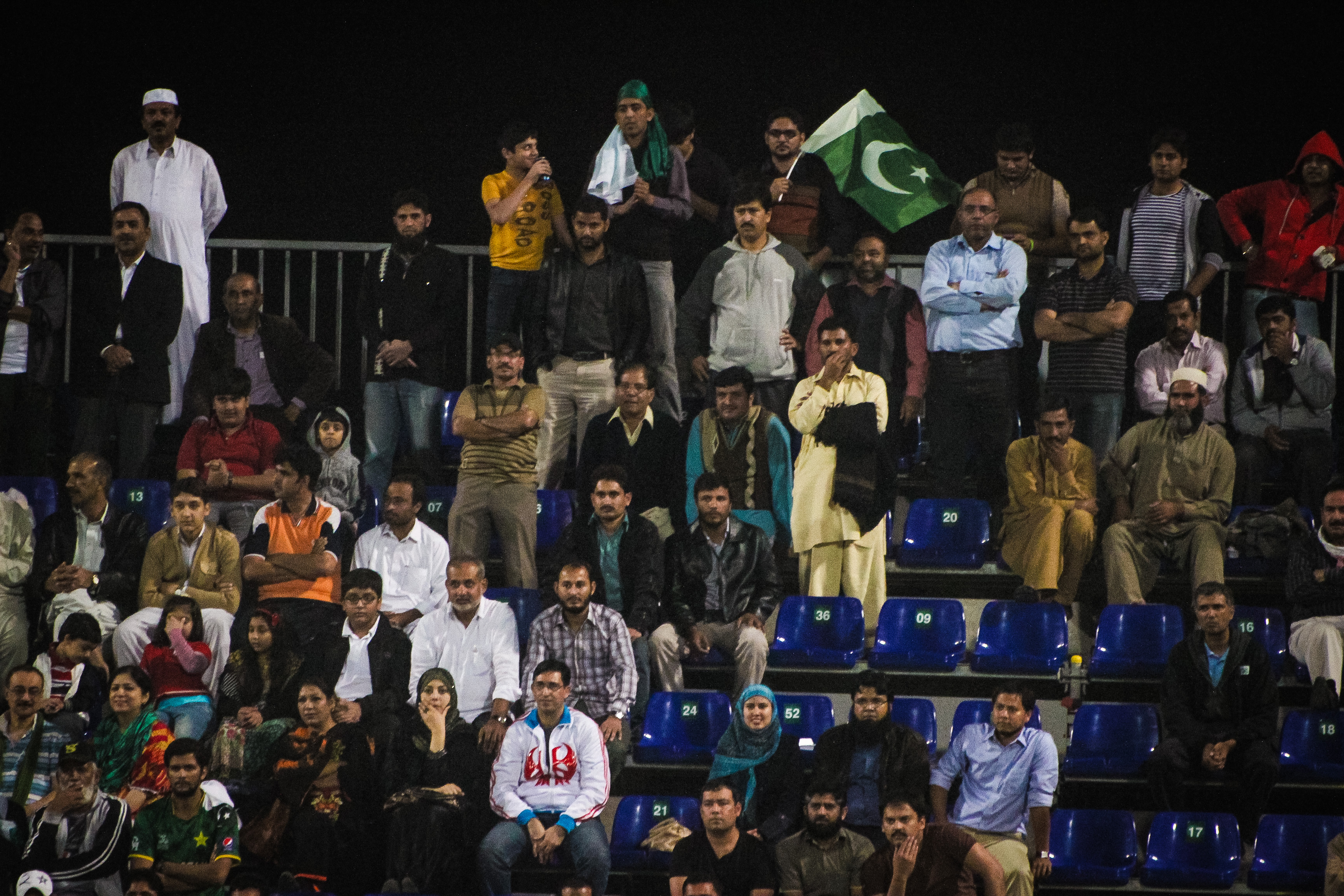
- Pakistani supporters in Malaysia during a hockey match between Pakistan and Malaysia.

Total population
- 85,013 (2020 official govt estimate)

Languages
- Urdu · Saraiki · Punjabi · Pashto · Malay · Sindhi · English

Religion
- Predominantly; Islam; Minority; Hinduism

Related ethnic groups
- Pakistani diaspora, Jawi Peranakan

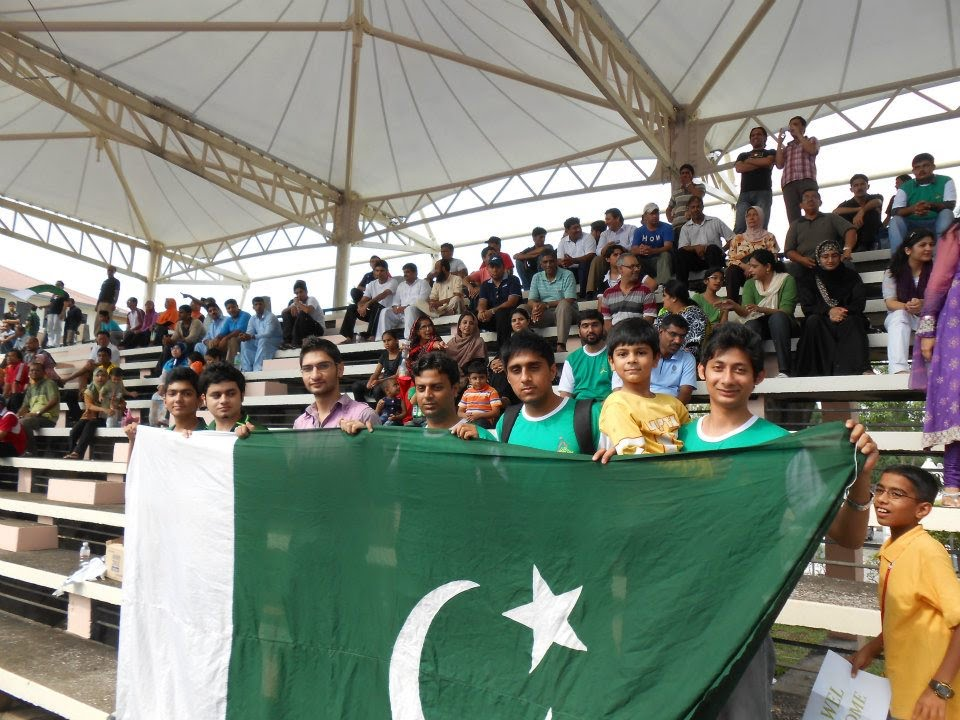
Pakistanis in Malaysia

Pakistanis in Malaysia form the largest Pakistani diaspora community in southeast Asia and they also make up the 6th largest group of foreign workers/nationals in Malaysia as of 30 June 2017 according to the Malaysia's home ministry.

== Population ==
The Malays and Pakistanis share strong Muslim identity. At the time of Malaysia's independence under the Federation of Malaya Independence Act 1957, there were more than two hundred thousand Pakistanis residing in Malaysia, rather than forming a separate group under the categorised system, at the suggestion of Malays themselves, Pakistanis immersed themselves into the Malay group, thus they became part of the Bumiputra elite, enriched by social ties, intermarriage, and shared economic and political aspirations. They also took positions in the civil service administration and gradually rose to the upper echelons of government, by then inextricably intermixed with the Malay majority.

The actual number of Pakistani people in Malaysia is generally understated, as the figure provided by the Pakistani Ministry of Labour merely assert that those who hold Pakistani citizenship. An absolute number of Pakistanis people and their descendants are likely to exceed 100,000. This is heavily contributed to fact that the early settlers came from British Raj (which includes present-day Pakistan) during the colonial days have obtained Malaysian citizenship. Throughout the years, most of Pakistani-Malaysians and their descendants are partially or fully assimilated with the Malay majority due to their common Islamic background, high level of intermarriage and to receive state aid of Malaysian affirmative action policy under Article 153, thus registered themselves as Malays. Nonetheless, they identified their ethnic roots as Pakistani. A vast majority of Pakistanis can be considered as having South Asian racial ancestry, given their close roots to the Indo-Aryan people groups of the region. The primary languages spoken by Pakistanis in Malaysia is Urdu, as well as Malay.

== Employment ==
According to official figures released by Malaysia's Home Ministry the number of legal foreign workers from Pakistan stood at 59,281 as of June 2017. Under a 2005 agreement between Pakistan and Malaysia, as many as 100,000 Pakistanis may eventually work in Malaysia, especially in the manufacturing, construction, and plantation sectors; the Pakistani workers are intended to replace nearly 400,000 illegal immigrants from Indonesia, the Philippines, Bangladesh, India, and Sri Lanka who departed the country under an amnesty which ended in March 2005. Lt. General Tahir Mahmud Qazi, Pakistan's High Commissioner to Malaysia, expected that the number of Pakistanis in Malaysia would reach that figure of 100,000 by the end of 2010.

Some Pakistani workers recruited by the unscrupulous employment agencies often live in bad conditions in Malaysia. Social practices of victimisation and the precarious conditions in which they live make them feel insecure, alienated, and emotionally tense. Some of their fellow Pakistani friends and relatives who acted as agents and sub-agents are also being partly responsible for victimising them.

== Travel ==
In addition to the Pakistanis working in Malaysia, the country receives as many as 50,000 visitors from Pakistan each year; Pakistan's Airblue plans has launched direct flights to Kuala Lumpur in 2009 and ordered fourteen Airbus A320 planes to service the route.

== Demographics ==
Historical population
Year	Pop.	±% p.a.
1970	...	—
1980	...	—
1991	...	—
2000	...	—
2010	...	—
2017	59,281	—
2020	85,013	+12.77%

== Notable people ==
Almost all figures in the list of the notable people Pakistani descent in Malaysia are of mixed descent, particularly with the ethnic Malays. Mixed-marriage is a pattern which is shared with most of Pakistani descent in Malaysia (excluding to the recently arrived migrants), after settling in the Malaysian soil after generations, assimilation process and the common Islamic background.

- Ashmen Iskandar Weiss – Malaysian teen idol
- Aliakbar Gulasan - nominated assemblyman of the Sabah State Legislative Assembly
- Bront Palarae – Malaysian actor
- Ghulamhaidar Khan – politician, member of Sabah State Legislative Assembly (MLA) for Kawang
- Izara Aishah – Malaysian model and actress
- Kalsom of Pahang – Former Sultanah of the state of Pahang
- Mohd Asghar Khan Goriman Khan – 20th Chief of the Royal Malaysian Air Force
- Musa Aman – politician, former Chief Minister (CM) and current Yang di-Pertua Negeri (TYT) of Sabah
- Neelofa – Malaysian beauty queen and television personality
- Yakubah Khan – politician, former Sabah State Minister of Science, Technology and Innovation and current member of Sabah State Legislative Assembly (MLA) for Karambunai

== See also ==
- Malaysia–Pakistan relations
- Punjabi Malaysians
- Pakistani diaspora
- Ethnic groups in Malaysia
