= Malaysia–Vietnam relations =

- Malaysia: Vietnam

Malaysia–Vietnam relations date to at least the 15th century. Malaysia forged diplomatic ties with the modern-day Vietnamese state on 30 March 1973; as of 2015, these ties are still in existence. During the late 1970s and 1980s, the countries' relationship became strained as a result of the Cambodian–Vietnamese War and the influx of Vietnamese boat people into Malaysia. The subsequent resolution of these issues saw the cultivation of strong trade and economic ties, and bilateral trade between the countries grew strongly, with an expansion into areas including information technology, education and defence. Both countries are members of APEC and ASEAN.

Vietnam and Malaysia share a maritime border in the Gulf of Thailand and the South China Sea, and have overlapping claims in the Spratly Islands. Both have an embassy located in the other's capital; Vietnam has an embassy in Kuala Lumpur, and Malaysia has an embassy in Hanoi and a consulate office in Ho Chi Minh City. Historical records show that Vietnamese people have visited states and Sultanates comprising modern-day Malaysia in small numbers since the 18th century, and Malaysia is currently home to a large Vietnamese expatriate community consisting of migrant workers, mail order brides and students, numbering around 100,000 people. Vietnam also hosts a small Malaysian expatriate community, consisting mostly of businessmen based in Ho Chi Minh City and Hanoi.

== History ==
=== Early contacts (7th to 18th century) ===
The earliest record of historic contact between present-day Malaysia and Vietnam dates back to 7th century, when according to the Tang dynasty's annals, Buddhist monks from northern Vietnam ventured to the Malay peninsula during their trips to India. In 767, Srivijaya or Javanese fleets invaded northern Vietnam. Champa and Malay kingdoms throughout the Medieval age often maintained close contact. The earliest record of diplomatic contact between the Viet state and Malaysia is dated back to 1469, when soldiers of Vietnamese Dai Viet kingdom had captured a Malaccan tributary mission en route to the Chinese Ming dynasty, killing some of them, and castrating and enslaving the survivors. Dai Viet expressed their intent to conquer Malacca by naval force at the time; this intent was conveyed to the Chinese emperor in a later mission in 1481. The Chinese emperor ordered Malacca to raise soldiers in the event of a similar attack and pressured Vietnam to not take a naval expedition to Malacca. Malaccan auxiliaries defeated the Vietnamese during a battle in Lan Xang as reported in a Chinese account. The Malay Annals also mention a Cham prince taking some of his followers to form a small Cham colony in Malacca when Vietnam invaded Champa in 1471, and deploying military assistance to Johor to fend off a botched military conquest in the 1590s. In the mid 17th-century, the Cham vassal states Panduranga and Kelantan cultivated close diplomatic ties when they led a long-term diplomatic mission to Kelantan to learn more about Malay culture and Islam. Subsequent Champa kings after Po Rome, beginning with his son Po Saut, periodically received Malay Muslim missionaries from Kelantan in the 17th and 18th centuries. The town of Pengkalan Chepa (lit. "Champa Landing") was known as a focal point of Cham migrants to Kelantan during this time.

=== British colonial era (18th to mid-20th century) ===
Not long after Penang was established as a port by the British at the end of the 18th century, Vietnamese junks began to visit the area for trade at the instruction of the Vietnamese emperor in Hue. An early account in the late 1790s showed Nguyen Anh's (who became Emperor Gia Long) merchant ship docking in Penang carrying cargoes of sugarcane en route to India. Soldiers referred to Penang in its Sino-Vietnamese terminology, Tân Lang dữ (Chinese character: 檳榔嶼); a royal narrative in 1810 showed the Vietnamese began to refer to Penang as Cù lao Cau, meaning Palm Island. Vietnamese Catholics travelled to Penang for seminary studies from the 1840s; these included illuminary Pétrus Ky. ethnic Chinese from Cochinchina sailed to the east in the Sultanate of Terengganu to trade in poultry and rice; some also settled there and assimilated with the local Chinese.

In the late 1920s and early 1930s, Ho Chi Minh played a key role in facilitating the formation of the Nanyang Communist Party—later renamed the Malayan Communist Party (MCP)—and visited Malaya on several occasions, such as presiding over a ceremony to mark the formation of the Malayan Communist Party in Buloh Kasap, Johor, in April 1930. Ho Chi Minh's influence on the MCP paved the way for Lai Teck, who was also of Vietnamese origin, to be appointed as the MCP's Secretary General between 1934 and 1938. Collaboration and communications between the MCP and the Vietnamese Communists increased following Lai Teck's disappearance in the late 1940s; the MCP briefly facilitated the shipping and transport of light ammunitions to the Viet Minh around this time. During World War II, both the Viet Minh and Malayan Peoples' Anti-Japanese Army (MPAJA) opposed the Japanese invasion of French Indochina and Malaya. Closer ties between communist cadres from Malaya and Vietnam were forged following successful efforts by the Communist victory at Dien Bien Phu in 1954; the Viet Minh provided small-scale logistical and communication support and training to the MCP in the 1950s and 1960s.

=== Vietnamese refugees (1975 to 2005) ===
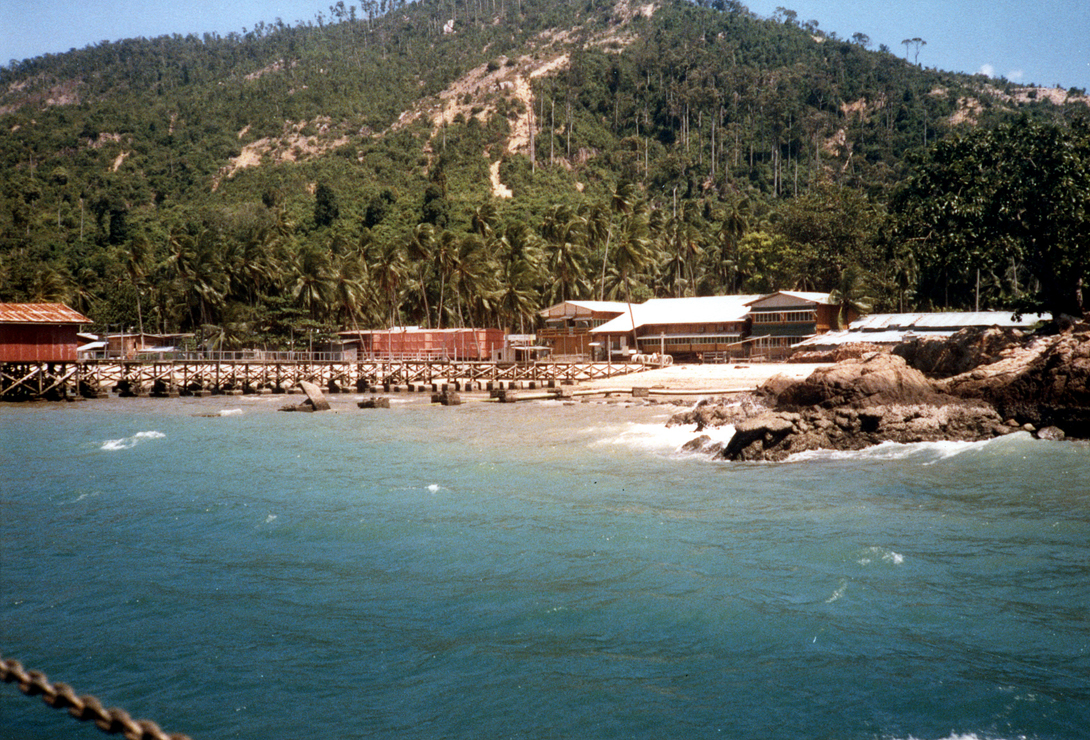
The jetty for the Pulau Bidong refugee camp 1985, where up to 10,000 refugees may have been housed at any point of time. The camp was closed in 1991.

In May 1975, shortly after the Fall of Saigon at the end of the Vietnam War, the first Vietnamese refugees arrived in Malaysia, and the first boat that arrived carried 47 refugees. Until 1978, more Vietnamese fled their country, and many of them were of Chinese descent. According to Malaysian government statistics, the country hosted 19,000 refugees in November 1978, compared to 500 in 1977. The Malaysian government responded by directing its Home Ministry to set up Federal Task Force VII in 1978, which was tasked with limiting the rising number of refugees from landing in Malaysia. The press reported incidents of Malaysian police and army personnel turning away the refugees, but some refugees resorted to deliberately sinking their boats to gain admittance to Malaysia. When the government was informed of boat-sinking attempts made by the refugees, then Deputy Prime Minister Mahathir Mohamad announced in June 1979 that legislation would be introduced to empower the police and navy to shoot refugees attempting to land. The government quickly recanted Mahathir's shooting threat.

The first Vietnamese refugee camp was opened in Pulau Bidong in August 1978 with United Nations assistance; the island accommodated up to 25,000 refugees. Other refugee camps were set up at Pulau Tengah, Pulau Besar, Kota Bharu, Kuantan, Sarawak and Sabah. In 1982, a transit centre was established at Sungei Besi, where refugees awaiting deportation to Western countries that were willing to accept them would be housed. The number of Vietnamese refugee arrivals fluctuated between 1981 and 1983, before a period of significant decrease from 1984 to 1986. In 1987, Malaysia and other neighbouring countries saw a sudden increase in the number of Vietnamese refugees landing in Malaysia. At an ASEAN summit in June 1987, member countries chastised the Vietnamese government for not having sufficiently addressed the refugee problem.

In August 1988, Malaysia and Vietnam jointly proposed an involuntary repatriation agreement, which provided for Vietnamese refugees that failed to gain admittance to Western countries to be counselled to return to Vietnam. A few Vietnamese government delegations were deployed to conduct outreach sessions at some of the refugee camps. This arrangement was considered unsuccessful because less than 40 individuals registered for the voluntary repatriation programme between 1988 and 1989. A deadline was set for 14 March 1989, whereby all Vietnamese who arrived before that date would automatically be considered refugees and all refugees arriving after that date would undergo a screening process to assess whether they qualified for refugee status. The screening process was proposed by the United Nations High Commissioner for Refugees (UNHCR) in June 1988; it involved thorough background checks on arrivals to determine whether they qualify for refugee status to be sent to any Western countries that were willing to accept them. Within 10 months, 4,000 of 9,000 refugees were sent to Western countries. In the same period, an additional 11,000 refugees arrived in Malaysia.

The implementation of stringent rules that require Vietnamese arrivals to qualify for refugee status prompted some of them to opt for the voluntary repatriation programme; between 1,000 and 2,000 arrivals to Malaysia returned to Vietnam in 1989. Refugees who opted to return to Vietnam were provided with a monthly stipend for up to one year by the UNHCR. In the early 1990s, as Vietnam began to experience economic growth, the number of refugee arrivals to Malaysia dropped. Joint collaborations between Malaysia, Vietnam and UNHCR to address the problem enabled Malaysia to reduce the size of its Vietnamese refugee populace, facilitating the closure of the Pulau Bidong refugee camp in November 1991. 3,000 Vietnamese refugees participated in the voluntary repatriation programme, and Malaysia's refugee populace reduced to 6,000 by 1994. Most of the remaining arrivals were not able to pass the UNHCR screening process and were classified as illegal immigrants. The majority of them expressed their reluctance to be repatriated to Vietnam; demonstrations and rioting broke out when news of the camp's impending closure was announced in 1995. Sungei Besi refugee camp was later closed in June 1996. The last refugees returned to Vietnam in 2005.

== Diplomatic ties ==
Malaysia established diplomatic ties with North Vietnam on 31 March 1973 at the ambassadorial level after the Paris Peace Accords were signed that year. An agreement between the ambassadors of Malaysia and Vietnam was reached in 1975. The following year, Malaysia first opened its embassy in Hanoi, while Vietnam also opened its embassy in Kuala Lumpur on 29 May 1976. In the mid to late 1970s, bilateral ties were strained as Malaysia pressured Vietnam to embrace the ZOPFAN concept, which the latter interpreted as a version of the anti-communist containment policy. From 12 to 17 October 1978 Vietnamese Prime Minister Pham Van Dong visited Malaysia. Here he pledged Vietnam would not interfere in the internal affairs of other nations and laid a wreath at the National Monument.

When Vietnam invaded Cambodia in 1979, many Vietnamese sought refuge in Malaysia from that time onwards and into the 1980s, and caused economic and national security problems to Malaysia especially to its racial balance as most of the Vietnamese refugees resemble the Chinese people. Bilateral ties normalised from 1988 onwards, when Vietnam announced plans to withdraw from Cambodia. In the early 1990s, government leaders of both countries held several diplomatic visits and summits, which produced many agreements that emphasised economic co-operation and development. Strengthening ties also saw the opening of a consulate office in Ho Chi Minh City in January 1991. Vietnam expressed its interest in joining ASEAN with Malaysia's support in 1994 as the countries continued to foster close economic ties. Vietnam joined ASEAN in 1995; its entry was warmly welcomed by Malaysia.

In the 1990s, bilateral ties were characterised by trade and economic co-operation; other areas of bilateral co-operation were explored from 2000 onwards. In that year, Vietnam and Malaysia reached an agreement on bilateral efforts on law enforcement and suppressing the trans-national drug trade. In 2004, three Memoranda of Understanding (MoU) in the areas of information technology, education and diplomatic ties, and co-operation-in-general were signed. Bilateral co-operation between both countries was also extended to defence matters in 2008 when another MoU was signed, which proposed for joint military trainings and collaboration in the defence industry between the Malaysian and Vietnamese militaries. The MoU also provided for the navies of both countries to prevent Vietnamese fishermen from encroaching into Malaysian waters for fishing activities as well as to control piracy.

=== Relations with South Vietnam (1957 to 1975) ===
Malaysia–South Vietnam relations

- Malaysia: South Vietnam

Relations with the former state of South Vietnam were established when South Vietnam recognised the Federation of Malaya's independence on 1957. From that point, Malaya provided aid to the South Vietnamese regime in its fight against the Viet Cong and North Vietnamese army. Malayan Prime Minister Tunku Abdul Rahman made a first visit on 1958 which was reciprocated twice by the South Vietnamese President Ngô Đình Diệm on 28–31 January 1958 and in October 1961. By 1963, when Malaya transformed into Malaysia (with an additional territory in the island of Borneo), the main government in Kuala Lumpur worried the influence of North Vietnamese communists would threaten its existence in accordance to the Domino theory, thus changing its position to become very supportive of the American involvement in the Vietnam War as Malaysia had also experienced a communist insurgency of its own. Tunku Abdul Rahman then expressed these concerns in December 1966 and called on the United States and the United Kingdom to provide increased logistical support to war efforts in Vietnam. Malaysia hosted training courses in public administration and jungle warfare for government officials, and provided motorcycles to bolster the South Vietnamese police and military logistical capabilities. Towards the end of the Vietnam War in 1975, Malaysia closed its embassy in Saigon in two stages; first it withdrew the embassy dependants on 12 April 1975, before a complete closure 16 days later—two days before the fall of Saigon. Malaysia had also extended recognition to the short-lived Provisional Revolutionary Government of the Republic of South Vietnam within days of its formation in May 1975, citing Malaysia's impartial position on political ideology and social system.

== Embassy ==
The Embassy of Malaysia in Hanoi is currently located at 43-45 Dien Bien Phu Street, where it has been located since 2004. Malaysia also has a Consular Office in Ho Chi Minh City that was opened in 1991, and its executive functions were later upgraded to that of Consular-General one year later. The Malaysian embassy in Hanoi has shifted three times since 1976:

- Thong Nhat Hotel (later renamed Sofitel Legend Metropole Hanoi), 1976–1983
- Van Phuc Diplomatic Compound, 1983–1984
- Fortuna Hotel Hanoi, 1984–2004

The Vietnamese embassy in Kuala Lumpur is located at 4 Persiaran Stonor and was opened in 1976 through the acquisition of the former South Vietnamese embassy. The Vietnamese embassy also has separate offices catering to labour and defence matters in two separate locations within Kuala Lumpur set up in the 2000s. In February 2013, the Vietnamese embassy secured the purchase of 0.69 hectares (2 acres) of land in Precinct 15, Putrajaya, that would be used for the construction and subsequent relocation of the Vietnamese embassy.

=== Vietnamese ambassadors to Malaysia ===
South Vietnam ambassadors to Malaysia

1. Phạm Khắc Rậu (1957–1958, Chargé d'affaires, resident in Singapore)
2. Tăng Văn Chỉ (1958–1959, Chargé d'affaires, resident in Singapore)
3. Trần Kim Phượng (1959–1964, Chargé d'affaires, resident in Singapore)
4. Trần Kim Phượng (1964–1967)
5. Nguyễn Duy Quang (1967–1973)
6. Vũ Kinh Luân (1973–1975, Chargé d'affaires, until the Fall of Saigon)

== Economy and trade ==
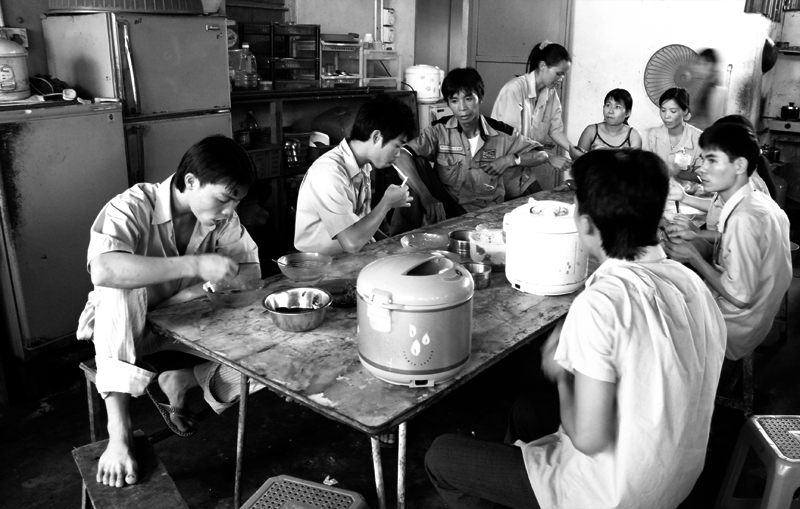
Vietnamese factory workers having a lunch break in their dormitory at Taiping, Perak

Bilateral trade between Malaysia and Vietnam stood at US$2.2 million following the end of the Vietnam War in 1975. Within the first three years after the war, Malaysia proposed to extend economic and technical assistance to Vietnam's oil palm and rubber industries. Malaysia exported zinc to Vietnam and signed a contract that would facilitate the import of Vietnamese vegetables into Malaysia. These early co-operations and proposals ended following Vietnam's invasion of Cambodia in 1979. Economic co-operation slowly resumed from 1988, when bilateral trade between the countries stood at $50 million. In 1990, bilateral trade increased to $140 million and to $235 million in 1991. Around this time, Malaysian businessmen began to open hotels in Vung Tau to cater to its flourishing tourism industry. At a bilateral summit in 1992, both countries agreed on the idea of joint oil and gas exploration; Vietnam has a sizeable number of oil fields in the South China Sea.

Around this time, Malaysian statuory boards and government-linked companies including Bank Negara, MIDAS and Petronas started to provide technical assistance programmes to Vietnam. Vietnam also sought Malaysia's assistance to develop its banking sector; Malaysia's Public Bank formed joint ventures with VID bank (later BIDV bank) to open branches in Hanoi and Ho Chi Minh City between 1993 and 1994. By 1994, Malaysia became ASEAN's second largest investor in Vietnam. Exports from Vietnam to Malaysia mainly consisted of rice, rubber, oil seeds and machinery, while Malaysia exported machinery, equipment and chemicals mainly derived from the former's economic assistance to the country. Malaysian businessmen were responsible for the development of the An Don Export Processing Zone beginning in 1994 in Danang. At an APEC meeting in 1994, Malaysia's Prime Minister Mahathir Mohamad spoke of the belief that Malaysia did not need to be totally self-reliant in food, and expressed his interest in procuring some food from Vietnam as a means of strengthening economic ties. Two years later, Malaysian-made Proton Wira cars were first sold in Vietnam.

A joint commission meeting between the countries in 1996 brought skilled and semi-skilled workers entering Vietnam from Malaysia from that time onwards. Between 2002 and 2003, the first wave of Vietnamese workers arrived in Malaysia to provide labour for its expanding manufacturing sector. By 2003, there were 67,000 Vietnamese workers in Malaysia; both countries signed a memorandum of understanding exempting unskilled Vietnamese workers from needing a sufficient grasp of English or the Malay language to qualify for employment. The number of Vietnamese work permit holders increased slightly to 80,000-90,000 by 2011; their presence later extended to other sectors including construction, housekeeping, agriculture and the service sector. A few Vietnamese workers found employment in Chinese restaurants as waiters, and learnt to speak some Chinese as well.

In 2015, Malaysia was the largest ASEAN's investor in Vietnam with total pledges of US$2.47 billion. Malaysia and Vietnam have signed a joint statement on strategic partnership in economic matters along with a memorandum of understanding on joint patrol, hotline contact, search and rescue co-ordination, and piracy prevention in the South China Sea. There is also a Malaysia Business Chamber in Vietnam. In 2019, Vietnam ambassador to Malaysia Lê Quý Quỳnh said at a business conference in Kuala Lumpur on July that they are targeting to raise bilateral trade between the two countries to US$25 billion by 2025. Both countries had signed an agreement on five-year action programme from 2015 until 2020, aiming to lift bilateral trade turnover to US$15 billion by 2020. A joint statement was issued in the same year with both agreed to increase political, economic, security co-operation and work together to maintain peace in the South China Sea.

== Social developments ==
A sizeable number of Malaysian men have foreign wives, especially Vietnamese women. Accounts of such marriages first surfaced in the 1990s, but in the 2000s these marriages became especially popular with older Chinese Malaysian men. A thriving matchmaking industry in which prospective grooms could select Vietnamese brides based on road shows and profiling methods has developed. Malaysian spouses cited the inability to find a local spouse because of career commitments and cultural affinity between Chinese Malaysians and Vietnamese as their main motivations for finding a Vietnamese wife. Such unions have faced considerable issues, such as language barriers, cases in which wives abandon their Malaysian spouses and take their mixed-race children back to Vietnam, and extortion. A Chinese community leader, Michael Chong, said the key reason for runaway Vietnamese brides was their inability to adapt to Malaysian life and society, and that many of the women married to escape poverty in their homeland.

Malaysia is home to almost 100,000 Vietnamese nationals, mostly concentrated in the industrial hubs in the West Malaysian states of Penang, Negeri Sembilan, Selangor and Johor. Vietnamese migrant workers have occasionally been mistreated by employers, and have faced overcrowded dormitories, salary deductions and physical abuse at work. A sizeable number of crimes in Malaysia, including robbery, rape, murder, and prostitution, have been attributed to the Vietnamese community. In 2008, the then Inspector-General of the Malaysian police Musa Hassan, said the Malaysian police had handled more than 200 cases of crimes involving the Vietnamese community in 2008. Vietnamese women are common in the Malaysian prostitution trade, Malaysian clients have attributed their popularity to their alluring physique and good hospitality practices. Some Vietnamese prostitutes have reportedly resorted to registering false student passes or false marriages with local men to gain employment in this trade; many were forced into prostitution after being tricked by unscrupulous agents promising them employment as waitresses or factory workers in Malaysia.

== Resident diplomatic missions ==
- Malaysia has an embassy in Hanoi and a consulate-general in Ho Chi Minh City.
- Vietnam has an embassy in Kuala Lumpur.

== See also ==
- Foreign relations of Malaysia
- Foreign relations of Vietnam
- Vietnamese people in Malaysia
