= Vietnamese people in Malaysia =

Malaysians of Vietnamese origin
Total population
- 70,000

Regions with significant populations
- Kuala Lumpur, Negeri Sembilan, Penang, Selangor, Johor, Sabah, Sarawak

Languages
- Vietnamese, Chinese and Malay

Religion
- Predominantly Vietnamese folk religion, atheism, Buddhism, Caodaism, and Christianity

Related ethnic groups
- Vietnamese

The Vietnamese Malaysians consists of people of full or partial Vietnamese descent who were born in or immigrated to Malaysia. The estimated number of people who speak Vietnamese in Malaysia is 70,000 in the country.

== Migration history ==
=== Vietnamese refugees ===
After the Fall of Saigon, in 1975 (at the end of the Vietnam War) Malaysia experienced the immigration of Vietnamese refugees. The first refugee boat that arrived in Malaysia was in May 1975, carrying 47 people. A Vietnamese refugee camp was established later in Pulau Bidong in August 1978 with the assistance of the United Nations. Other refugee camps were also set up in other regions of Malaysia such as Pulau Tengah, Pulau Besar, Kota Bharu, Kuantan, Sarawak, Sabah, and Kuala Lumpur. In 1989 many Vietnamese refugees were sent back, violating Malaysia's agreement with the UN to help the refugees. Approximately 5,401 refugees were denied asylum in Malaysia. At a conference in Geneva in June 1989, an agreement had been reached stating that refugees arriving past March 1989 were no longer automatically labeled as refugees. As Vietnam began to witness economic growth in the early 1990s, the number of refugee arrivals also quickly dropped in the early 1990s. The joint collaboration efforts between Malaysia, Vietnam and UNHCR to address the refugee problem enabled Malaysia to quickly downsize its Vietnamese refugee populace, facilitating the closure of the Pulau Bidong refugee camp in November 1991.

=== Present ===
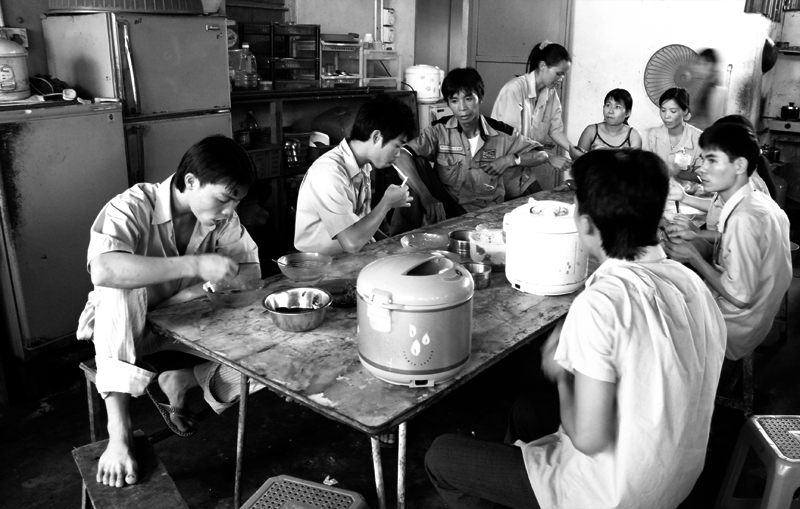
A group of Vietnamese factory workers having a break in Taiping, Perak

A joint commission meeting between the two countries in 1996 saw the arrival of skilled and semi-skilled workers entering Vietnam from Malaysia in the late 1990s. Between 2002 and 2003, Malaysia saw the first wave of Vietnamese workers coming to Malaysia to provide for its labour demand in the expanding manufacturing sector. By 2003, there were 67,000 Vietnamese workers in Malaysia and both countries signed a Memorandum of Understanding which exempted unskilled Vietnamese workers from having to master a sufficient grasp of English or Malaysian language to qualify for employment. The number of Vietnamese work permit holders increased slightly to 80,000-90,000 by 2011, and their presence later expanded to other sectors including construction, housekeeping, agriculture and service sectors. However, these permits also had been used by sexual traffickers to lure Vietnamese women into Malaysian brothels; one raid in January 2014 rescued a total of 108 victims, which 37 of them still have a valid passports.

== See also ==
- Malaysia–Vietnam relations
- Vietnamese diaspora
- Ethnic groups in Malaysia
