= Demographics of Malaysia =

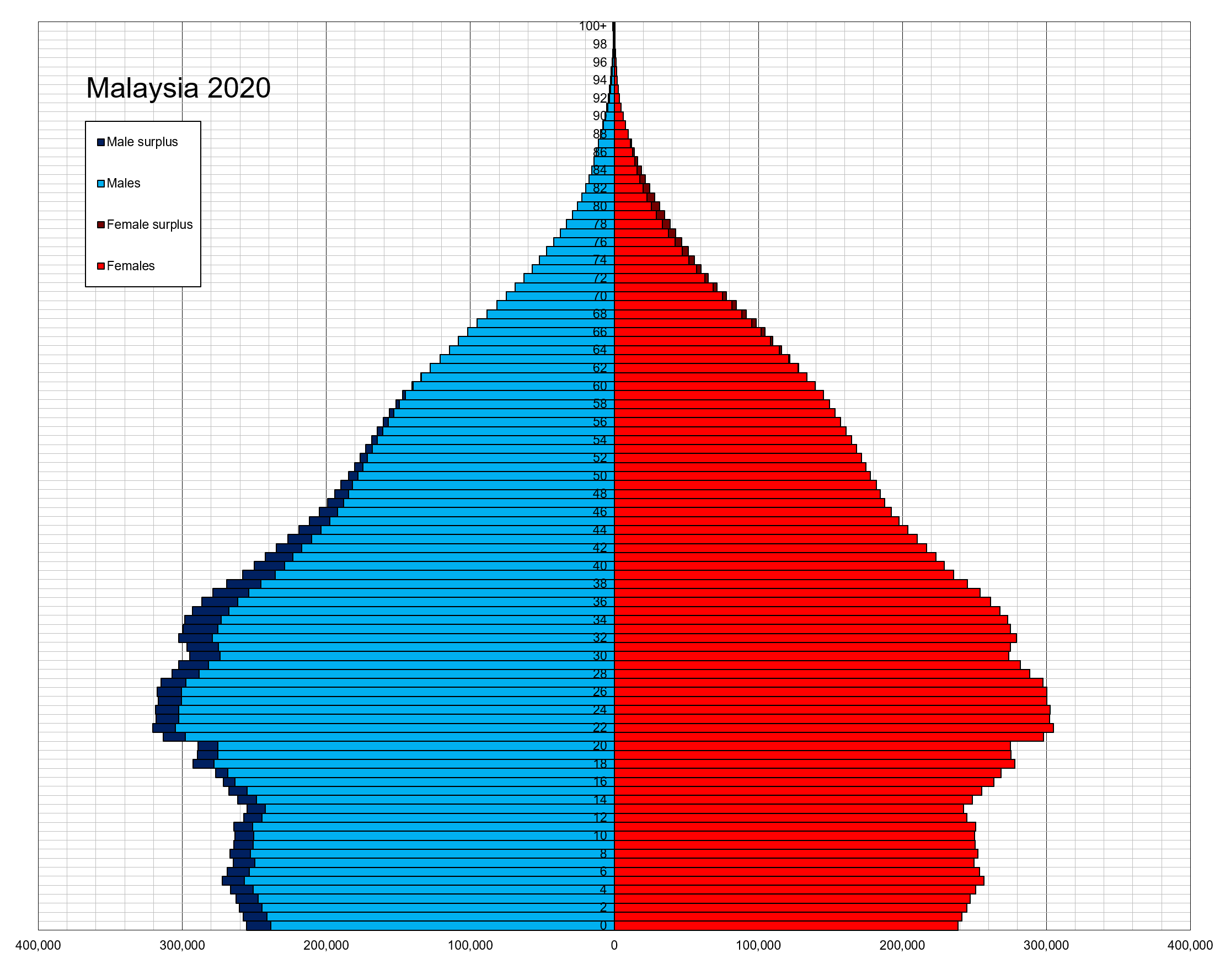
- Population pyramid of Malaysia in 2020
- Population: 36,385,115 (1 May 2026)
- Growth rate: 1.13% (2026 est.)
- Birth rate: 11.6 births/1,000 population (2025 est.)
- Death rate: 5.8 deaths/1,000 population (2025 est.)
- Life expectancy: 76.13 years
  - male: 74.5 years
  - female: 77.88 years
- Fertility rate: 1.47 children born/woman (2025 est.)
- Infant mortality: 6.58 deaths/1,000 live births
- Net migration rate: 1.48 migrant(s)/1,000 population (2022 est.)
- Immigrant share: 10.7% (2024)

Age structure
- 0–14 years: 22.45%
- 15–64 years: 69.43%
- 65 and over: 8.13%

Sex ratio
- Total: 1.09 male(s)/female (2026 est.)
- At birth: 1.07 male(s)/female
- Under 15: 1.06 male(s)/female
- 65 and over: 1.15 male(s)/female

Nationality
- Nationality: Malaysian
- Major ethnic: Malay/Bumiputera
- Minor ethnic: Chinese (23.3%); Indian (6.7%); Others (0.7%)

Language
- Official: Malay (Note: Malay serves as a lingua franca spoken by over 80% of the population.)
- Spoken: English, Manglish, Mandarin, Tamil and others

Malaysia is a multi-ethnic country with a diverse population. As of 2026, the official population estimate is about 36.3 million. According to the 2020 census, there were 32,447,385 people including non-citizens, placing Malaysia as the 43rd most populous country globally. In 2025, around 6.2 million lived in East Malaysia and 27.8 million in Peninsular Malaysia. Population distribution is uneven, with about 79 percent of citizens residing in Peninsular Malaysia, which covers less than 40 percent of the country's total land area.

As of 2017, Malaysia's population was growing at an annual rate of 1.94 percent. Based on projections from the 2010 census, fertility rates among the three largest ethnic groups were estimated at 2.4 children per woman for Malays and Bumiputeras, 1.8 for Indians and 1.4 for Chinese. Malay fertility rates were about 40 percent higher than those of Indians and 56 percent higher than those of Chinese. By 2023, Malays and other Bumiputeras made up 69.9 percent of the population, while Chinese and Indians comprised 22.8 and 6.6 percent respectively.

Although the absolute number of Chinese increased from 2.4 million in 1957 to 6.6 million in 2017, their proportion of the population has declined since independence, when they formed around 45 percent of Malaya. In contrast, the Malay population grew from approximately 3.1 million in 1957 to 15.5 million in 2017. Due to various socioeconomic factors, including differences in fertility rates, migration trends and policy dynamics, the share of non-Malay and non-Bumiputera communities, such as the Chinese and Indians, has gradually declined since 1957.

== Population size and structure ==
Censuses were taken in Malaysia in 1970, 1980, 1991, 2000, 2010, and 2020. The total population is around 32.4 million according to the 2020 census. The population distribution is highly uneven, with some 20 million residents concentrated in Peninsula Malaysia. 74.7% of the population is urban. Due to the rise in labour-intensive industries, Malaysia is estimated to have over 3 million migrant workers, which is about 10% of the Malaysian population. The exact numbers are unknown: there are a million legal foreign workers and perhaps another million unauthorised foreigners. The state of Sabah alone had nearly 25% of its 2.7 million population listed as illegal foreign workers in the last census. Sabah based NGOs estimate that out of the 3 million population, 2 million are illegal immigrants.

Additionally, according to the World Refugee Survey 2008, published by the US Committee for Refugees and Immigrants (USCRI), Malaysia hosts a population of refugees and asylum seekers numbering approximately 155,700. Of this population, approximately 70,500 refugees and asylum seekers are from the Philippines, 69,700 from Burma, and 21,800 from Indonesia. The USCRI named Malaysia as one of the ten worst places for refugees on account of the country's discriminatory practices toward them. Malaysian officials are reported to have turned deportees directly over to human smugglers in 2007, and Malaysia employs RELA, a volunteer militia, to enforce its immigration law.

View source data.
View source data.
View source data.

Population in Peninsular Malaysia by parliamentary constituency (2020 census)

=== Population distribution by states and territories ===
Source: National Census 2000, Department of Statistics Malaysia.

Population in Peninsular Malaysia by local authority (2020 census)

==== In 2000 ====
State	Population	Area (km^{2})	Pop. density	Urban pop.	Bumiputra	Chinese	Indians
Johor	2,740,625	18,987	144	65.2%	57.1%	35.4%	6.9%
Kedah	1,649,756	9,425	175	39.3%	76.6%	14.9%	7.1%
Kelantan	1,313,014	15,024	87	34.2%	95.0%	3.8%	0.3%
Malacca	635,791	1,652	385	67.2%	62.8%	30.1%	6.5%
Negeri Sembilan	859,924	6,644	129	53.4%	57.9%	25.6%	16.0%
Pahang	1,288,376	35,965	36	42.0%	76.8%	17.7%	5.0%
Penang	1,313,449	1,031	1274	80.1%	42.5%	46.5%	10.6%
Perak	2,051,236	21,005	98	58.7%	54.7%	32.0%	13.0%
Perlis	204,450	795	257	34.3%	85.5%	10.3%	1.3%
Selangor	4,188,876	7,960	526	87.6%	53.5%	30.7%	14.6%
Terengganu	898,825	12,955	69	48.7%	96.8%	2.8%	0.2%
Sabah	2,603,485	73,619	35	48.0%	80.5%	13.2%	0.5%
Sarawak	2,071,506	124,450	17	48.1%	72.9%	26.7%	0.2%
FT Kuala Lumpur	1,379,310	243	5676	100.0%	43.6%	43.5%	11.4%
FT Labuan	76,067	92	827	77.7%	79.6%	15.8%	1.3%
FT Putrajaya	45,000	148	304	100.0%	94.8%	1.8%	2.7%

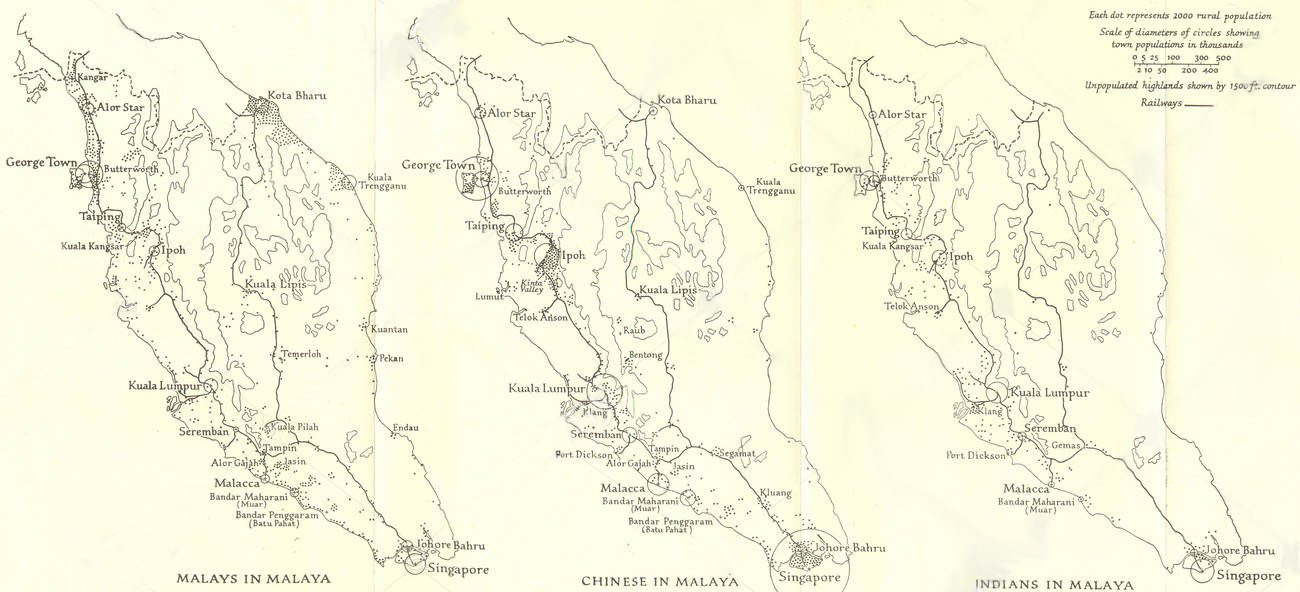
Visual distribution of races in Malaya (1945)

- Putrajaya data is for 2004.
- Population estimates are rounded to the nearest hundred.

==== In 2010 ====
Source: National Census 2010, Department of Statistics Malaysia

State	Population	Area (km^{2})	Pop. density	Urban pop.(%)	Bumiputra (%)	Chinese (%)	Indian (%)
Johor	3,348,283	18,987	174	71.9%	58.9%	33.6%	7.1%
Kedah	1,890,098	9,425	199	64.6%	77.9%	13.6%	7.3%
Kelantan	1,459,994	15,024	97	42.4%	95.7%	3.4%	0.3%
Malacca	788,706	1,652	470	86.5%	66.9%	26.4%	6.2%
Negeri Sembilan	997,071	6,644	150	66.5%	61.3%	23.2%	15.2%
Pahang	1,443,365	35,965	40	50.5%	79.0%	16.2%	4.4%
Penang	1,520,143	1,031	1,500	90.8%	43.6%	45.6%	10.4%
Perak	2,258,428	21,005	110	69.7%	57.0%	30.4%	12.2%
Perlis	227,025	795	280	51.4%	88.4%	8.0%	1.2%
Selangor	5,411,324	7,960	670	91.4%	57.1%	28.6%	13.5%
Terengganu	1,015,776	12,955	69	59.1%	97.0%	2.6%	0.2%
Sabah	3,117,405	73,619	42	54.0%	84.8%	12.8%	0.3%
Sarawak	2,420,009	124,450	19	53.8%	74.8%	24.5%	0.3%
FT Kuala Lumpur	1,627,172	243	6,891	100.0%	45.9%	43.2%	10.3%
FT Labuan	86,908	92	950	82.3%	83.7%	13.4%	0.9%
FT Putrajaya	67,964	148	1,400	100.0%	98.0%	0.7%	1.2%

==== In 2020 ====
Source: National Census 2020, Department of Statistics Malaysia

State	Population	Area (km^{2})	Pop. density	Urban pop.(%)	Bumiputra (%)	Chinese (%)	Indian (%)
Johor	4,009,670	18,987	210	77.4%	60.1%	32.8%	6.6%
Kedah	2,131,427	9,425	225	67.3%	80.1%	12.3%	6.3%
Kelantan	1,792,501	15,024	119	44.1%	96.6%	2.5%	0.3%
Malacca	998,428	1,652	604	90.9%	71.7%	22.1%	5.6%
Negeri Sembilan	1,199,974	6,644	180	69.3%	63.3%	21.9%	14.3%
Pahang	1,591,295	35,965	44	52.8%	81.0%	14.7%	3.7%
Penang	1,740,405	1,031	1,686	92.5%	44.7%	44.9%	9.7%
Perak	2,496,041	21,005	119	72.0%	60.9%	27.2%	11.5%
Perlis	284,885	795	348	53.8%	88.8%	7.4%	1.8%
Selangor	6,994,423	7,960	882	95.8%	60.6%	27.3%	11.3%
Terengganu	1,149,440	12,955	89	64.2%	97.6%	2.1%	0.2%
Sabah	3,418,785	73,619	46	54.7%	88.7%	9.5%	0.2%
Sarawak	2,453,677	124,450	20	57.0%	75.7%	23.8%	0.2%
FT Kuala Lumpur	1,982,112	243	8,157	100.0%	47.7%	41.6%	10.0%
FT Labuan	95,120	92	1038	88.9%	86.2%	11.7%	1.1%
FT Putrajaya	109,202	49	2,215	100.0%	97.9%	0.6%	1.2%

==== In 2025 ====
Source: Dosm. (n.d.). Department of Statistics Malaysia. https://www.dosm.gov.my/portal-main/release-content/current-population-estimates-2025

State	Population	Area (km^{2})	Pop. density	Bumiputra (%)	Chinese (%)	Indian (%)
Johor	4,205,900	18,987	221	61.2%	31.8%	6.5%
Kedah	2,228,000	9,425	236	81.0%	11.7%	6.1%
Kelantan	1,907,700	15,024	126	96.7%	2.4%	0.3%
Malacca	1,052,500	1,652	637	72.8%	21.1%	5.5%
Negeri Sembilan	1,244,600	6,644	187	64.6%	20.9%	14.0%
Pahang	1,678,200	35,965	46	82.0%	13.9%	3.5%
Pulau Pinang	1,803,300	1,031	1,749	46.2%	43.7%	9.5%
Perak	2,574,900	21,005	122	62.4%	26.0%	11.2%
Perlis	297,800	795	374	89.2%	7.0%	1.8%
Selangor	7,406,800	7,960	930	61.8%	26.3%	11.0%
Terengganu	1,246,900	12,955	96	97.8%	1.9%	0.1%
Sabah	3,759,600	73,619	51	89.2%	8.9%	0.2%
Sarawak	2,529,800	124,450	20	76.3%	23.2%	0.2%
FT Kuala Lumpur	2,074,100	243	8,535	49.0%	40.4%	9.8%
FT Labuan	100,900	92	1096	86.6%	10.8%	1.0%
FT Putrajaya	120,800	49	2,465	98.0%	0.5%	1.2%

=== Population age distribution trends for 2001–2016 ===
Year	< 15 Years	15 - 64 Years	> 64 Years	Population (in millions)
2001	32.7%	63.4%	3.9%	24.12
2002	31.9%	64.1%	4.0%	24.72
2004	30.4%	65.5%	4.1%	25.91
2005	29.7%	66.1%	4.2%	26.48
2006	29.2%	66.5%	4.3%	26.83
2007	28.7%	66.9%	4.4%	27.00
2008	28.2%	67.3%	4.5%	27.54
2009	27.7%	67.7%	4.6%	27.90
2010	27.2%	68.1%	4.7%	28.25
2015	24.9%	69.3%	5.8%	31.20
2016	24.5%	69.5%	6.0%	31.71

Data from July 2010.

=== Structure of the population ===
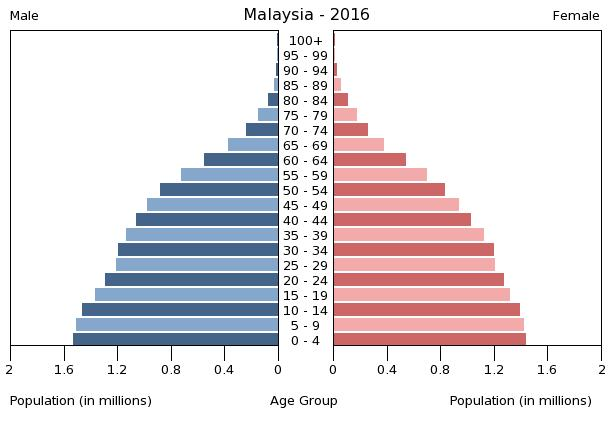
Population pyramid

Population Estimates by Sex and Age Group (01.VII.2011) (Data refer to projections based on the 2000 Population Census.):

Age group	Male	Female	Total	%
Total	14 523 912	14 028 800	28 552 712	100
0–4	1 257 227	1 197 893	2 455 120	8.60
5–9	1 258 724	1 200 377	2 459 101	8.61
10–14	1 407 479	1 333 133	2 740 612	9.60
15–19	1 382 650	1 298 541	2 681 191	9.39
20–24	1 305 753	1 255 439	2 561 192	8.97
25–29	1 225 425	1 202 220	2 427 645	8.50
30–34	1 156 987	1 133 836	2 290 823	8.02
35–39	1 084 255	1 055 838	2 140 093	7.50
40–44	1 021 261	980 714	2 001 975	7.01
45–49	923 951	878 655	1 802 606	6.31
50–54	780 930	741 641	1 522 571	5.33
55–59	627 320	599 062	1 226 382	4.30
60–64	440 893	421 490	862 383	3.02
65–69	276 593	276 416	553 009	1.94
70–74	180 583	198 929	379 512	1.33
75–79	104 871	127 903	232 774	0.82
80–84	56 445	73 578	130 023	0.46
85–89	22 803	31 736	54 539	0.19
90+	9 762	21 399	31 161	0.11
Age group	Male	Female	Total	Percent
0–14	3 923 430	3 731 403	7 654 833	26.81
15–64	9 949 425	9 567 436	19 516 861	68.35
65+	651 057	729 961	1 381 018	4.84

Population Estimates by Sex and Age Group (01.VII.2015) (Estimates based on the adjusted Population and Housing Census of 2010.):

Age group	Male	Female	Total	%
Total	15 994 299	15 001 407	30 995 706	100
0–4	1 342 280	1 250 354	2 592 634	8.36
5–9	1 290 296	1 220 033	2 510 329	8.10
10–14	1 361 753	1 289 823	2 651 576	8.55
15–19	1 467 520	1 374 861	2 842 381	9.17
20–24	1 666 826	1 512 363	3 179 189	10.26
25–29	1 636 156	1 453 738	3 089 894	9.97
30–34	1 421 538	1 277 508	2 699 046	8.71
35–39	1 122 020	1 012 167	2 134 187	6.89
40–44	966 696	919 886	1 886 582	6.09
45–49	866 201	857 006	1 723 207	5.56
50–54	802 194	754 597	1 556 791	5.02
55–59	662 308	642 015	1 304 323	4.21
60–64	504 442	495 056	999 498	3.22
65–69	370 875	378 953	749 828	2.42
70–74	225 299	236 337	461 636	1.49
75–79	151 764	168 867	320 631	1.03
80–84	73 949	85 206	159 155	0.51
85–89	38 547	47 792	86 339	0.28
90–94	13 383	14 359	27 742	0.09
95+	10 252	10 486	20 738	0.07
Age group	Male	Female	Total	Percent
0–14	3 994 329	3 760 210	7 754 539	25.02
15–64	11 115 901	10 299 197	21 415 098	69.09
65+	884 069	942 000	1 826 069	5.89

Population Estimates by Sex and Age Group (01.VII.2020) (Estimates based on the adjusted results of the Population and Housing Census of 2010.):

Age group	Male	Female	Total	%
Total	16 805 601	15 851 659	32 657 260	100
0–4	1 313 211	1 228 960	2 542 171	7.78
5–9	1 321 691	1 232 295	2 553 986	7.82
10–14	1 288 772	1 215 312	2 504 084	7.67
15–19	1 468 340	1 367 361	2 835 701	8.68
20–24	1 649 108	1 483 506	3 132 614	9.59
25–29	1 729 641	1 518 081	3 247 722	9.94
30–34	1 503 303	1 374 201	2 877 504	8.81
35–39	1 325 416	1 243 400	2 568 816	7.87
40–44	1 041 407	969 239	2 010 646	6.16
45–49	900 990	878 715	1 779 705	5.45
50–54	809 250	824 736	1 633 986	5.00
55–59	744 683	723 021	1 467 704	4.49
60–64	604 050	605 327	1 209 377	3.70
65–69	442 747	458 890	901 637	2.76
70–74	310 254	336 607	646 861	1.98
75–79	171 384	194 969	366 353	1.12
80–84	101 116	119 005	220 121	0.67
85+	80 238	78 034	158 272	0.48
Age group	Male	Female	Total	Percent
0–14	3 923 674	3 676 567	7 600 241	23.27
15–64	11 776 188	10 987 587	22 763 775	69.71
65+	1 105 739	1 187 505	2 293 244	7.02

=== Age distribution in Malaysia ===
Source: Department of Statistics Malaysia. (2024, July 31). [2024] Current Population Estimates. OpenDOSM. https://open.dosm.gov.my/publications/population_2024. Department of Statistics Malaysia, 2025. [2025] Current Population Estimates. OpenDOSM. Available at: https://open.dosm.gov.my/publications/population_2025 [Accessed 17 October 2025]. Department of Statistics Malaysia. (2023, July 31). Current Population Estimates: 2023. OpenDOSM. https://open.dosm.gov.my/publications/population_2023.

Age distribution of the Malay population in Malaysia, 2020–2025
Age groups	0–14 (%)	15–64 (%)	65-over (%)	Total
2020	4,398,800 (26%)	11,434,100 (67.6%)	1,080,100 (6.4%)	16,913,000
2021	4,462,200 (25.9%)	11,643,600 (67.5%)	1,142,600 (6.6%)	17,248,400
2022	4,476,400 (25.7%)	11,763,700 (67.5%)	1,181,900 (6.8%)	17,422,000
2023	4,489,100 (25.5%)	11,893,600 (67.5%)	1,232,200 (7.0%)	17,614,900
2024	4,498,200 (25.3%)	12,028,800 (67.5%)	1,285,800 (7.2%)	17,812,800
2025	4,463,100 (24.8%)	12,161,700 (67.7%)	1,356,400 (7.5%)	17,981,200

Age distribution of the Chinese population in Malaysia, 2020–2025
Age groups	0–14 (%)	15–64 (%)	65-over (%)	Total
2020	1,489,000 (21.6%)	4,801,000 (69.7%)	602,400 (8.7%)	6,892,400
2021	1,424,000 (20.7%)	4,835,600 (70.2%)	632,100 (9.1%)	6,891,700
2022	1,350,400 (19.6%)	4,868,200 (70.9%)	655,100 (9.5%)	6,873,700
2023	1,278,300 (18.6%)	4,903,700 (71.4%)	684,200 (10.0%)	6,866,200
2024	1,215,900 (17.7%)	4,927,900 (71.9%)	713,500 (10.4%)	6.857,300
2025	1,143,600 (16.7%)	4,951,000 (72.3%)	755,000 (11%)	6,849,600

Age distribution of the Indian population in Malaysia, 2020–2025
Age groups	0–14 (%)	15–64 (%)	65-over (%)	Total
2020	446,300 (22.3%)	1,411,800 (70.7%)	140,700 (7%)	1,998,800
2021	431,400 (21.5%)	1,422,400 (71.1%)	148,800 (7.4%)	2,002,600
2022	414,700 (19.6%)	1,430,600 (70.9%)	154,600 (9.5%)	1,999,900
2023	400,000 (20%)	1,440,700 (71.9%)	162,000 (8.1%)	2,002,700
2024	386,100 (19.3%)	1,449,300 (72.2%)	169,700 (8.5%)	2,005,100
2025	368,500 (18.4%)	1,457,900 (72.6%)	179,700 (9%)	2,006,100

=== Major cities ===
Kuala Lumpur is the capital and largest city of Malaysia. Although many executive and judicial branches of the federal government have moved to Putrajaya, Kuala Lumpur is the seat of the Parliament of Malaysia, making it the country's legislative capital. It is also the economic and business centre of the country, and is a primate city. Kuala Lumpur is also the only Alpha-rated global city in Malaysia. Along with Subang Jaya, Klang, Petaling Jaya, Shah Alam, Kajang-Sungai Chua, Ampang Jaya and Selayang it forms the country's largest and most important urban area, the Klang Valley.

George Town, the capital city of Penang used to be Malaysia's largest and only city until the 1970s when Kuala Lumpur was granted city status. Today, George Town, rated a Gamma global city, serves as the financial, industrial and medical tourism hub in the northern region of Malaysia. Together with Seberang Perai in mainland Penang, Sungai Petani, Kulim, Bandar Baharu and Yan in Kedah, and portions of Kerian and Selama in Perak, it forms the George Town Conurbation, the nation's second largest metropolitan area with a population of over 2.84 million.

Johor Bahru, the capital city of Johor and the largest state capital city in Malaysia, forms the third largest urban area as well as Malaysia's largest metropolitan area without spanning other states. It is situated at the country's southern end, comprising the cities of Johor Bahru, Iskandar Puteri and Pasir Gudang, along with Kulai and Pontian. Located next to Singapore, it is also an important industrial, tourism and commercial hub for Malaysia.

Other major cities in Malaysia include Ipoh, Kota Kinabalu and Kuching.

Largest cities and municipalities in Malaysia Department of Statistics, Malaysia (2020)
Rank	Name	State	Pop.	Rank	Name	State	Pop.
1	Kuala Lumpur	Federal Territory	1,982,112	11	Ipoh	Perak	759,952
2	Kajang	Selangor	1,047,356	12	Seremban	Negeri Sembilan	681,541
3	Seberang Perai	Penang	946,092	13	Iskandar Puteri	Johor	575,977
4	Subang Jaya	Selangor	902,086	14	Kuantan	Pahang	548,014
5	Klang	Selangor	902,025	15	Sungai Petani	Kedah	545,053
6	Johor Bahru	Johor	858,118	16	Ampang Jaya	Selangor	531,904
7	Shah Alam	Selangor	812,327	17	Kota Kinabalu	Sabah	500,425
8	George Town	Penang	794,313	18	Malacca City	Malacca	453,904
9	Petaling Jaya	Selangor	771,687	19	Sandakan	Sabah	439,050
10	Selayang	Selangor	764,327	20	Alor Setar	Kedah	423,868

== Vital statistics ==
=== Registered births and deaths ===
Data from Department of Statistics Malaysia:

	Average population	Live births	Deaths	Natural change	Crude birth rate (per 1000)	Crude death rate (per 1000)	Natural change (per 1000)	Crude migration rate (per 1000)	Total fertility rate (TFR)
1947	4,908,100				43.0	19.4	23.6		
1948	4,987,400				40.4	16.3	24.2	−8.0	
1949	5,081,800				43.8	14.2	29.6	−10.7	
1950	5,226,500				42.0	15.8	26.2	2.3	
1951	5,337,200				43.6	15.3	28.3	−7.1	
1952	5,506,400				44.4	13.6	30.8	0.9	
1953	5,706,000				43.7	12.4	31.3	4.9	
1954	5,888,600				43.8	12.2	31.6	0.4	
1955	6,058,300				43.0	11.5	31.6	−2.8	
1956	6,251,600				45.5	11.3	34.3	−2.4	
1957	6,278,800				46.2	12.4	33.7	−29.3	
1958	6,504,600				43.3	11.0	32.3	3.7	6.275
1959	6,702,600				42.1	9.7	32.4	−2.0	6.175
1960	8,118,000				40.9	9.5	31.4	179.8	6.045
1961	8,378,500				41.8	9.2	32.6	−0.5	6.195
1962	8,651,800				40.4	9.4	31.0	1.6	6.040
1963	8,920,200				38.1	8.5	29.7	1.3	5.970
1964	9,168,400				38.2	7.7	30.5	−2.7	5.970
1965	9,436,600				36.1	7.5	28.5	0.8	5.630
1966	9,732,800				36.7	7.3	29.4	2.0	5.725
1967	10,007,400				34.9	7.2	27.7	0.5	5.385
1968	10,252,800				35.2	7.2	28.0	−3.5	5.385
1969	10,500,200				33.3	7.0	26.3	−2.2	5.055
1970	10,881,800				32.4	6.7	25.7	10.6	4.885
1971	11,159,700				32.8	6.6	26.3	−0.8	4.870
1972	11,441,300				32.2	6.3	25.9	−0.7	4.710
1973	11,719,800				31.1	6.3	24.8	−0.5	4.485
1974	12,001,300				31.3	6.0	25.3	−1.3	4.420
1975	12,300,300				30.7	6.0	24.8	0.1	4.275
1976	12,588,100				30.9	5.7	25.3	−1.9	4.235
1977	12,901,100				30.3	5.8	24.5	0.4	4.090
1978	13,200,200				29.7	5.4	24.3	−1.1	3.950
1979	13,518,300				30.4	5.4	25.0	−0.9	3.990
1980	13,879,200				30.6	5.3	25.4	1.3	3.990
1981	14,256,900				31.2	4.9	26.3	0.9	4.015
1982	14,651,100				31.0	5.0	26.0	1.6	3.960
1983	15,048,200				30.2	5.1	25.1	2.0	3.825
1984	15,450,400				31.0	5.0	25.9	0.8	3.905
1985	15,882,700	497,414			31.5	5.0	26.6	1.4	3.980
1986	16,329,400				30.6	4.7	25.8	2.3	3.850
1987	16,773,500	488,200			29.3	4.5	24.7	2.5	3.680
1988	17,219,100	507,579			29.7	4.6	25.0	1.6	3.705
1989	17,662,100	469,663			26.8	4.6	22.2	3.5	3.355
1990	18,102,400	497,522	83,244	414,278	27.9	4.6	23.3	1.6	3.490
1991	18,547,200	511,527	84,221	427,306	27.6	4.5	23.0	1.6	3.447
1992	19,067,500	528,475	86,040	442,435	27.7	4.5	23.2	4.9	3.473
1993	19,601,500	541,887	87,626	454,261	27.6	4.5	23.2	4.8	3.466
1994	20,141,700	537,654	90,079	447,575	26.7	4.5	22.2	5.4	3.353
1995	20,681,800	539,295	95,103	444,192	26.1	4.6	21.5	5.3	3.278
1996	21,222,600	540,866	95,520	445,346	25.6	4.5	21.1	5.0	3.226
1997	21,769,300	537,104	97,042	440,062	24.8	4.5	20.4	5.4	3.125
1998	22,333,500	554,573	97,906	456,667	23.5	4.8	18.8	7.1	2.971
1999	22,909,500	554,200	100,900	453,300	22.8	4.9	17.9	7.9	2.896
2000	23,494,900	569,500	102,100	467,400	22.9	4.3	18.6	7.0	2.926
2001	24,030,500	505,479	104,531	400,948	21.0	4.3	16.7	6.1	2.709
2002	24,542,500	494,538	110,367	384,171	20.2	4.5	15.7	5.6	2.609
2003	25,038,100	481,399	112,744	368,655	19.2	4.5	14.7	5.5	2.494
2004	25,541,500	481,800	113,192	368,608	18.9	4.4	14.4	5.7	2.450
2005	26,045,500	474,473	115,436	359,037	18.2	4.4	13.8	5.9	2.362
2006	26,549,900	472,698	117,778	354,920	17.8	4.4	13.4	6.0	2.299
2007	27,058,400	479,647	120,670	358,977	17.7	4.5	13.3	5.9	2.274
2008	27,567,600	493,203	127,098	366,105	17.9	4.6	13.3	5.5	2.274
2009	28,081,500	501,644	131,328	370,316	17.9	4.7	13.2	5.4	2.245
2010	28,588,600	491,239	130,978	360,261	17.2	4.6	12.6	5.5	2.136
2011	29,062,000	511,594	135,463	376,131	17.6	4.7	12.9	3.7	2.174
2012	29,510,000	526,012	138,692	387,320	17.8	4.7	13.1	2.3	2.188
2013	30,213,700	503,914	142,202	361,712	16.7	4.7	12.0	11.8	2.022
2014	30,708,500	528,612	150,318	378,294	17.2	4.9	12.3	4.1	2.072
2015	31,186,100	521,136	155,786	365,350	16.7	5.0	11.7	3.9	2.002
2016	31,633,500	508,203	162,201	346,002	16.1	5.1	11.0	3.3	1.918
2017	32,022,600	508,685	168,168	340,517	15.9	5.3	10.6	1.7	1.890
2018	32,382,300	501,945	172,031	329,914	15.5	5.3	10.2	1.0	1.841
2019	32,523,000	489,863	174,254	315,609	15.1	5.4	9.7	−5.4	1.781
2020	32,447,400	471,504	167,181	304,323	14.5	5.2	9.4	−11.7	1.715
2021	32,576,300	439,744	224,931	214,813	13.5	6.9	6.6	−2.6	1.696
2022	32,698,100	423,124	206,780	216,344	12.9	6.3	6.6	−2.9	1.631
2023	33,401,800	455,761	196,965	258,796	13.6	5.9	7.7	13.3	1.732
2024	34,058,800	414,918	198,992	215,926	12.2	5.8	6.4	12.9	1.554
2025	34,300,000	396,175	199,807	196,368	11.6	5.8	5.8	1.6	1.47 (e)
2026									1.37 (e)

==== Current vital statistics ====
Period	Live births	Deaths	Natural increase
January—September 2025	294,298	147,416	+146,882
January—September 2026	277,576	151,154	+126,422
Difference	▼ –16,722 (-5.68%)	▲ +3,738 (+2.54%)	▼ −20,460

=== UN estimates ===
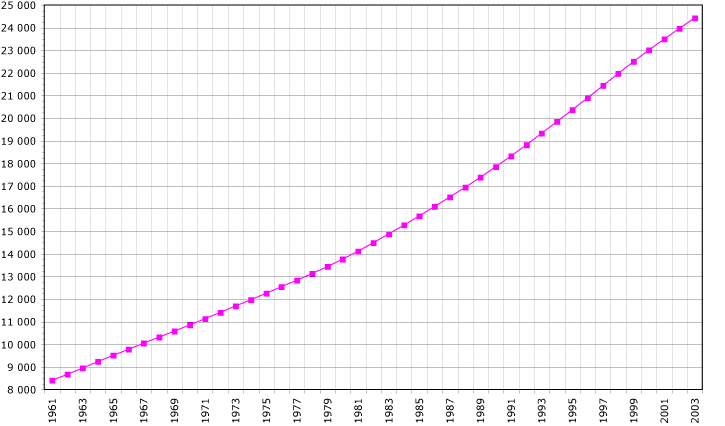
Population growth from 1961 to 2003

Data from United Nation:

Period	Live births per year	Deaths per year	Natural change per year	CBR^{1}	CDR^{1}	NC^{1}	TFR^{1}	IMR^{1}
1950–1955	280 000	92 000	188 000	42.7	14.0	25.3	6.23	96.4
1955–1960	318 000	89 000	229 000	41.9	11.7	28.9	6.23	79.5
1960–1965	361 000	86 000	275 000	40.8	9.7	29.9	6.23	64.3
1965–1970	351 000	82 000	268 000	34.2	8.0	28.1	5.21	51.0
1970–1975	365 000	82 000	283 000	31.4	7.1	25.9	4.56	40.4
1975–1980	385 000	83 000	302 000	29.4	6.3	21.7	3.93	31.9
1980–1985	436 000	86 000	350 000	29.5	5.8	26.4	3.73	25.3
1985–1990	488 000	91 000	397 000	28.7	5.3	26.9	3.59	19.9
1990–1995	535 000	97 000	438 000	27.5	5.0	22.8	3.42	15.7
1995–2000	559 000	104 000	454 000	25.3	4.7	19.8	3.18	12.4
2000–2005	572 000	114 000	458 000	19.4	4.5	14.9	2.45	
2005–2010	571 000	127 000	443 000	17.6	4.6	13.0	2.22	
2010–2015				17.1	4.7	12.4	2.11	
2015–2020				16.8	5.1	11.7	2.01	
2020–2025				15.9	5.5	10.4	1.92	
2025–2030				14.5	5.9	8.6	1.85	
^{1} CBR = crude birth rate (per 1000); CDR = crude death rate (per 1000); NC = natural change (per 1000); TFR = total fertility rate (number of children per woman); IMR = infant mortality rate per 1000 births

=== Registered Births and Deaths by Ethnic Group in Malaysia (2009-now) ===
Registered Births

Time	Malay	Other Bumiputera	Chinese	Indian	Total
2009	293,676 (62.8%)	63,826 (13.7%)	80,567 (17.2%)	29,383 (6.3%)	467,452
2010	297,947 (63.7%)	67,126 (14.4%)	74,310 (15.9%)	28,069 (6%)	467,452
2011	314,513 (64.4%)	69,652 (14.3%)	76,848 (15.7%)	27,265 (5.6%)	488,278
2012	318,358 (63.6%)	70,581 (14.1%)	85,649 (17.1%)	26,325 (5.2%)	500,913
2013	320,290 (66.1%)	68,822 (14.2%)	70,418 (14.5%)	24,987 (5.2%)	484,517
2014	334,961 (66.6%)	69,009 (13.7%)	74,159 (14.7%)	24,734 (5%)	502,863
2015	336,436 (67.7%)	67,110 (13.5%)	69,884 (14.1%)	23,677 (4.7%)	497,107
2016	335,361 (68.7%)	64,974 (13.3%)	65,568 (13.4%)	22,462 (4.6%)	488,365
2017	339,513 (69.4%)	65,365 (13.4%)	62,213 (12.7%)	22,314 (4.5%)	489,405
2018	337,239 (70%)	64,911 (13.5%)	57,926 (12%)	21,905 (4.5%)	481,981
2019	324,528 (69.4%)	64,170 (13.7%)	58,184 (12.4%)	21,028 (4.5%)	467,910
2020	374,032 (83.9%)		51,241 (11.5%)	20,379 (4.6%)	445,652
2021	304,620 (72.7%)	52,520 (12.5%)	43,833 (10.5%)	17,956 (4.3%)	418,929
2022	291,353 (72.5%)	52,928 (13.2%)	40,249 (10%)	17,439 (4.3%)	401,969
2023	305,494 (71.4%)	57,608 (13.5%)	44,818 (10.5%)	20,064 (4.6%)	427,984
2024	272,718 (70.4%)	51,982 (13.4%)	44,914 (11.6%)	17,914 (4.6%)	387,528
2025	262,627 (73.6%)	48,845 (13.7%)	31,840 (8.7%)	14,666 (4.0%)	357,978

=== Total fertility rate ===
==== Before 1950 ====
Years	1920	1921	1922	1923	1924	1925	1926	1927	1928	1929
Total Fertility Rate in Malaysia	5.45	5.40	5.35	5.30	5.25	5.19	5.14	5.09	5.04	4.99

Years	1930	1931	1932	1933	1934	1935	1936	1937	1938	1939
Total Fertility Rate in Malaysia	4.94	4.89	4.84	4.91	4.99	5.07	5.15	5.23	5.43	5.63

Years	1940	1941	1942	1943	1944	1945	1946	1947	1948	1949
Total Fertility Rate in Malaysia	5.45	5.33	5.20	5.07	4.94	4.82	4.69	5.05	5.41	5.81

==== TFR by ethnic group ====
	Malays	Chinese	Indians	Total
2010	2.695	1.517	1.733	2.136
2011	2.694	1.557	1.663	2.174
2012	2.743	1.719	1.579	2.188
2013	2.640	1.384	1.474	2.022
2014	2.653	1.414	1.384	2.018
2015	2.553	1.353	1.361	1.941
2016	2.482	1.345	1.337	1.892
2017	2.472	1.200	1.282	1.890
2018	2.415	1.112	1.256	1.841
2019	2.288	1.111	1.198	1.781
2020	2.192	0.981	1.177	1.715
2021	2.074	0.849	1.104	1.696
2022	2.066	0.787	1.076	1.631
2023	2.158	0.884	1.243	1.732
2024	1.910	0.893	1.111	1.554

==== TFR by state ====
Total fertility rate (TFR) by state according to year:

State	2011	2015	2020
Putrajaya	1.44	1.37	2.78
Kuala Lumpur	1.53	1.40	1.49
Penang	1.62	1.51	1.25
Sabah	1.81	1.64	1.33
Selangor	1.96	1.82	1.57
Johor	2.18	1.88	1.94
Melaka	2.23	1.93	1.73
Sarawak	2.23	2.01	1.53
Negeri Sembilan	2.30	2.02	1.96
Perak	2.39	2.05	1.66
Pahang	2.50	2.31	1.94
Perlis	2.56	2.33	1.96
Kedah	2.61	2.37	2.03
Terengganu	3.46	2.80	2.86
Kelantan	3.77	3.07	2.66

==== TFR by Race in 2024 ====
Total fertility rate (TFR) by state according to year: Source:

State	Malay	Chinese	Indian
Putrajaya	1.90	0.93	0.97
Kuala Lumpur	1.54	0.75	0.59
Penang	1.58	0.82	0.85
Sabah	3.45	0.59	1.40
Selangor	1.70	0.84	0.77
Johor	1.97	1.04	1.63
Melaka	1.81	1.03	0.76
Sarawak	1.69	1.21	0.75
Negeri Sembilan	1.88	0.84	0.81
Perak	1.88	0.93	0.84
Pahang	2.04	0.92	0.75
Perlis	1.64	0.74	0.48
Kedah	1.94	0.72	1.01
Terengganu	2.60	0.88	0.38
Kelantan	2.41	1.16	0.73

=== Life expectancy at birth ===
Life expectancy in Malaysia since 1950

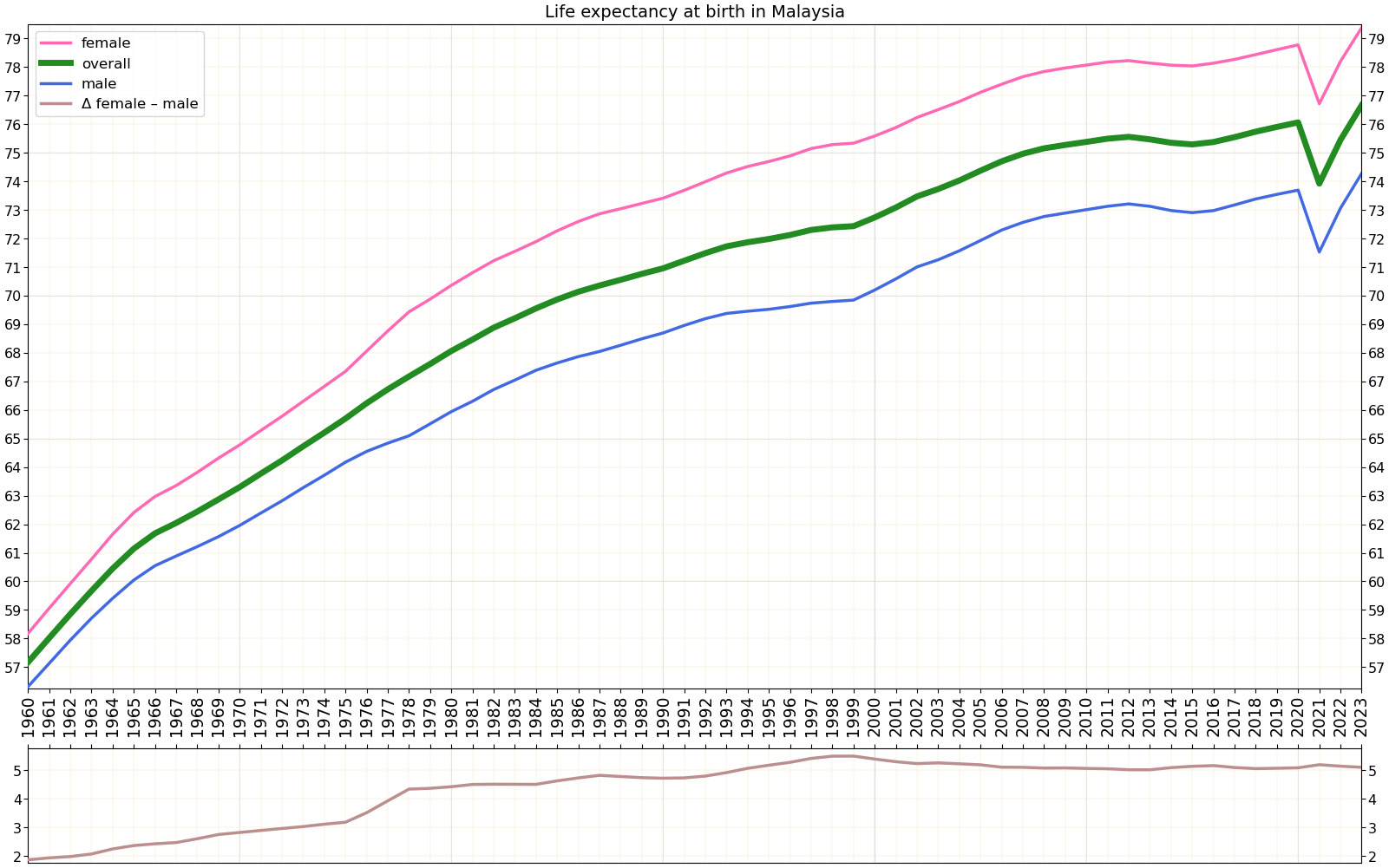
Life expectancy in Malaysia since 1960 by gender

Average life expectancy at age 0 of the total population.

Period	Life expectancy in Years	Period	Life expectancy in Years
1950–1955	54.8	1985–1990	70.1
1955–1960	57.9	1990–1995	71.3
1960–1965	60.9	1995–2000	72.3
1965–1970	63.3	2000–2005	73.2
1970–1975	65.4	2005–2010	73.7
1975–1980	67.2	2010–2015	74.7
1980–1985	68.8	2015–2020	75.9

== Ethnolinguistic groups ==
Ethnic groups in Malaysia (2025 census)
1. Bumiputeras (70.6%)
2. Chinese (22.1%)
3. Indians (6.50%)
4. Others (0.80%)

Malaysia's population comprises many ethnic groups. People of Austronesian origin make up the majority of the population, and are known as the Bumiputras. Large Chinese and Indian minorities also exist. Malays, as Bumiputra, see Malaysia as their land, and since race riots in 1969, Bumiputra have been especially privileged in Malaysia – top government positions are reserved for Malays, and the Malays received cheaper housing, priority in government jobs as well as business licenses. However, since the riot, racial stability has prevailed, if not full harmony, and mixed marriages are on the rise. In the 2010 census, 68.8 per cent of the population were considered bumiputera, 23.2 per cent Malaysian Chinese, and 7 per cent Malaysian Indian. In 2021 these figures were 69.7 per cent bumiputera, 22.5 per cent Chinese, and 6.8 per cent Indian.

Distribution of the Bumiputera and Chinese population in Malaysia

Group	Total
Malay, Malaysian language	6,916,000
Malay, Kedah	3,095,000
Malay, East coast	2,448,000
Han Chinese, Hokkien	1,903,000
Tamil	1,796,000
Han Chinese, Hakka	1,729,000
Han Chinese, Cantonese	1,396,000
Han Chinese, Teochew	1,004,000
Han Chinese, Mandarin	986,000
Minangkabau	901,000
Kadazan-Dusun, Central	714,000
Iban	686,000
Javanese	640,000
Arab people	500,000
Filipino, Tagalog	456,000
Han Chinese, Hainanese	396,000
Han Chinese, Northern Min	384,000
Brunei Malay, Kedayan	350,000
Malay, East Malaysia	280,000
Han Chinese, Eastern Min	256,000
Straits Chinese	244,000
Nepalese	224,000
Tausug	209,000
Malayali, Malayalam	228,900
Bugis	139,000
Telugus, Telugu	120,000
Murut people	110,131
Punjabis, Indian Punjabis	100,000
Siamese	80,000
Semai	50,000
Temiar	40,000
Lun Bawang/Lundayeh	31,600
Kelabit people	5,000

=== Bumiputras ===
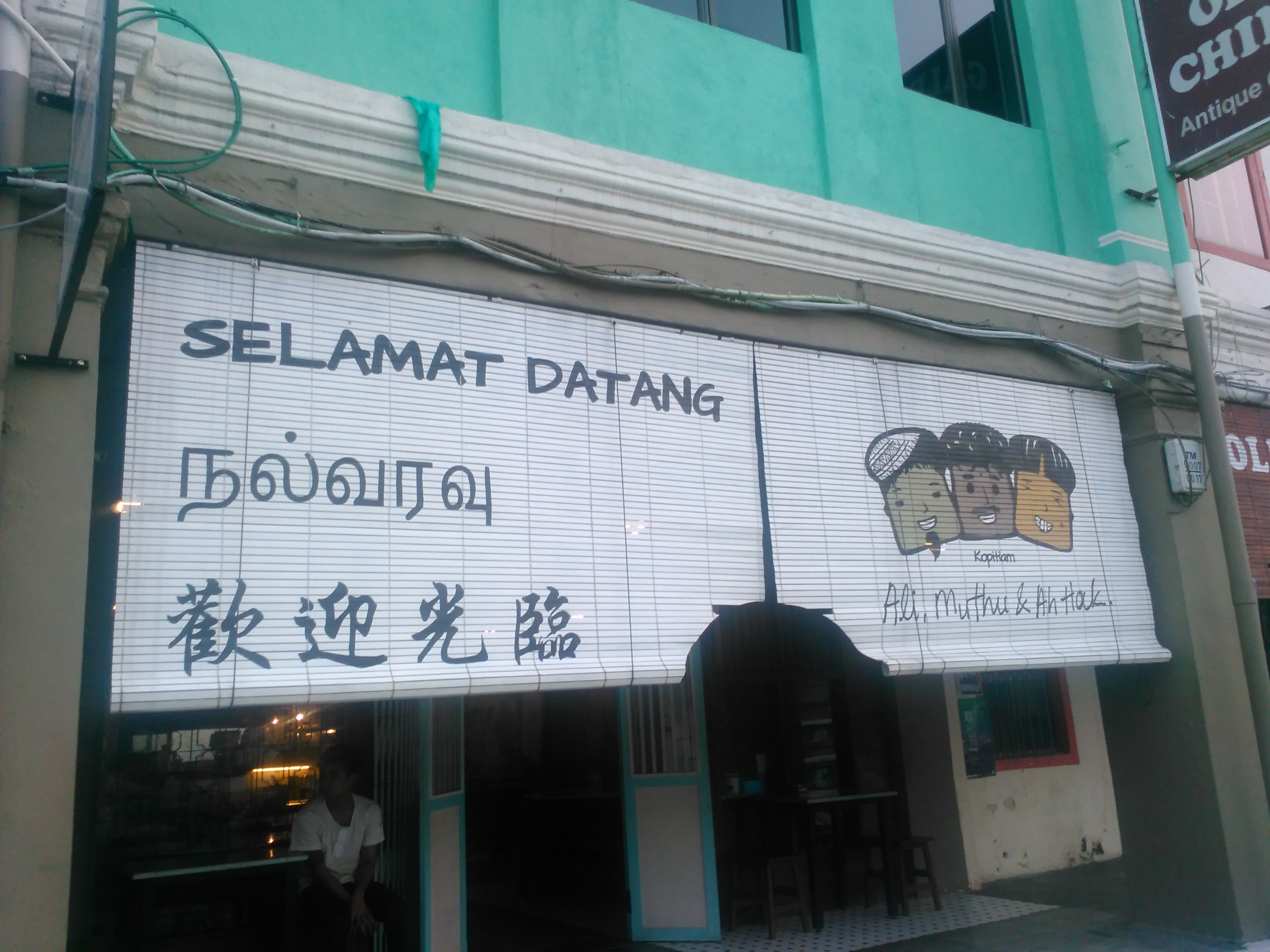
A storefront of a Kuala Lumpur kopi tiam that depicts the languages and ethnic groups of Malaysia

Bumiputras totaling 69.7% of Malaysia's population as of 2021 are divided into Muslim Malays proper, who make up the majority of the Malaysian population at 57.9%; and other bumiputra, who make up 13.2% of the Malaysian population, and most of whom belong to various Austronesian ethnic groups related to the Muslim Malays. Bumiputra status is also accorded to certain non-Malay indigenous peoples, including Orang Asli and the natives of Sabah and Sarawak. Laws over who gets Bumiputra status vary between states. Some Eurasians can obtain bumiputra privileges, providing they can prove they are of Portuguese (Kristang) descent.

==== Malays ====
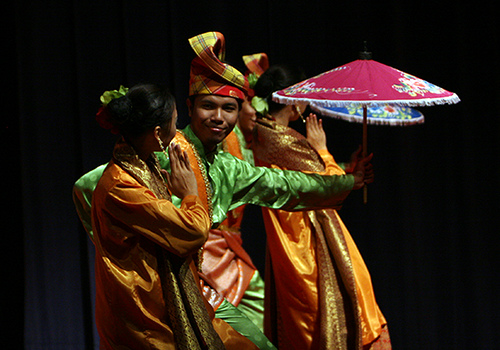
A Malay joget performance.

The Malays are an ethnic group predominantly inhabiting the Malay Peninsula and parts of Sumatra and Borneo. They form the largest community in Malaysia and play a dominant role politically. They make up about half of the total population. By constitutional definition, Malays are Muslims who practice Malay customs (adat) and culture.

Their language, Malay (Bahasa Melayu), is the national language of the country. Citizens of Minangkabau, Bugis or Javanese origins, who can be classified "Malay" under constitutional definitions may also speak their respective ancestral tongues. However, English is also widely spoken in major towns and cities across the country. Malays from different states in Malaysia carry distinct dialects that can sometimes be unintelligible to most of their fellow countrymen. By definition of the Malaysian constitution, all Malays are Muslims.

In the past, Malays wrote in Pallava or using the Sanskrit-based alphabet of Kawi. Arabic traders later introduced Jawi, an Arabic-based script, which became popular after the 15th century. Until then reading and writing were mostly the preserve of scholars and nobility, while most Malay commoners were illiterate. Jawi was taught along with Islam, allowing the script to spread through all social classes. Nevertheless, Kawi remained in use by the upper-class well into the 15th century. The Romanised script was introduced during the colonial period and, over time, it came to replace both Sanskrit and Jawi. This was largely due to the influence of the European education system, wherein children were taught the Latin alphabet.

Malay culture shows strong influences from Buddhism, Hinduism and animism. However, since the Islamisation movement of the 1980s and 90s, these aspects are often neglected or banned altogether. Because any Malay-speaking Muslim is entitled to Bumiputra privileges, many non-Malay Muslims have adopted the Malay language, customs and attire in the last few decades. This is particularly the case with Indian Muslims from the peninsula and the Kedayan of Borneo. The Malay ethnic group is distinct from the concept of a Malay race, which encompasses a wider group of people, including most of Indonesia and the Philippines.

==== Other Bumiputras ====
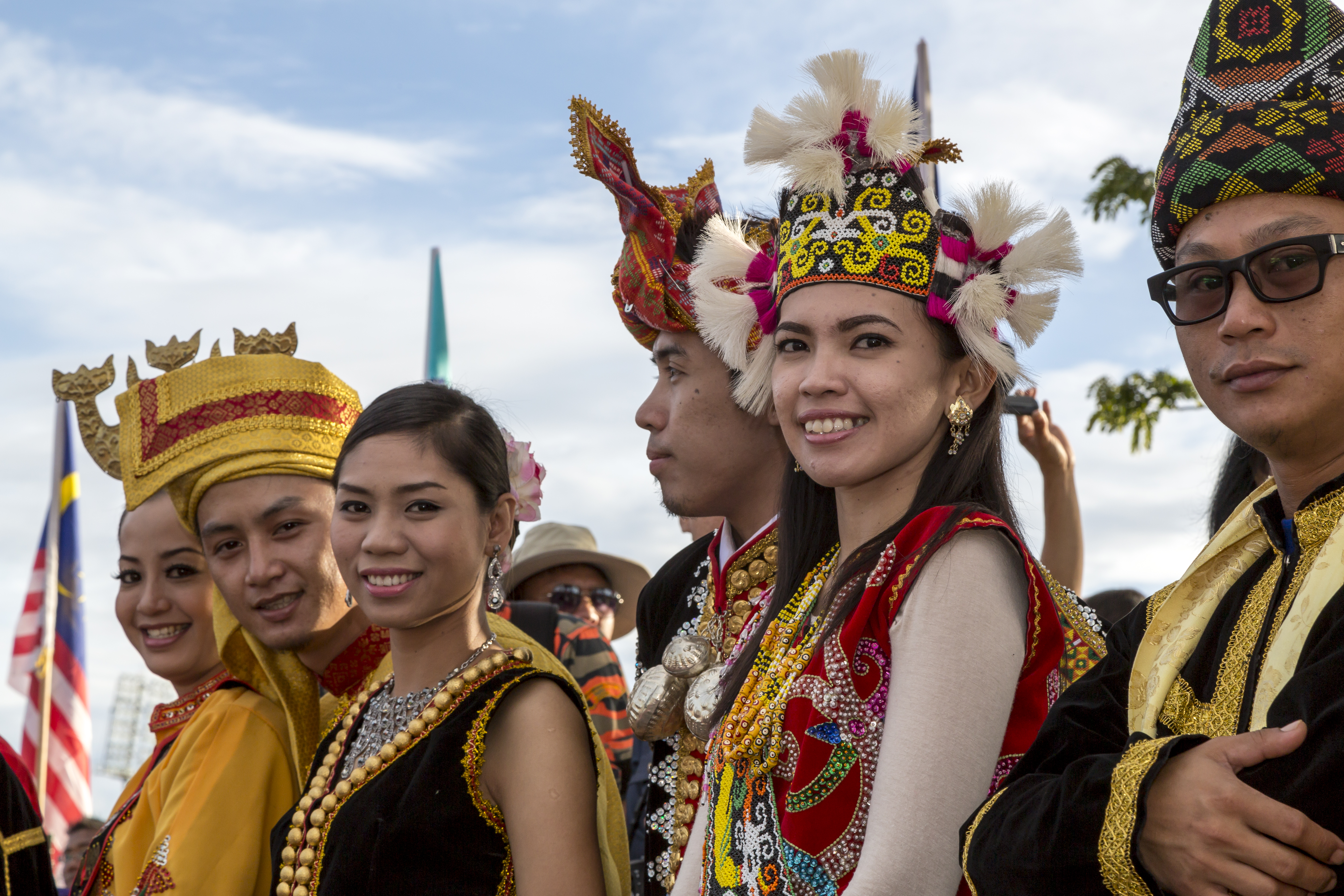
Ethnic groups in Sabah

Malaysia has many other non-Malay indigenous people, who are given Bumiputra status. The indigenous tribes are the oldest inhabitants of Malaysia, and the indigenous groups of Peninsular Malaysia are known collectively as Orang Asli and in East Malaysia as "Orang Asal". They account for about 11 percent of the nation's population, and represent a majority in East Malaysia of Sabah and Sarawak. In Sarawak, the dominant tribal group are the Dayak people, who are either Iban (also known as Sea Dayak) or Bidayuh (also known as Land Dayak) of which are mainly Christians. The Iban form the largest of all indigenous groups, numbering over 600,000 (35% of Sarawak's population), who mostly still live in traditional longhouses which can hold up to 200 people. Longhouses are mostly places along the Rajang and Lupar rivers and their tributaries, although many Iban have moved to the cities. The Bidayuhs, numbering around 170,000, are concentrated in the southwestern part of Sarawak. They, together with other indigenous groups in Sarawak make up over half of the states population.

The largest indigenous tribe in Sabah is the Kadazan, most of whom are Christians and rice farmers. They live as subsistence farmers. Sabah has a large number of indigenous people, 19.3% of the population are Kadazan-Dusuns, and 16.5% are Bajaus.

There also exist aboriginal groups in much smaller numbers on the peninsula, where they are collectively known as Orang Asli (literally meaning "original person"). The 140,000 Orang Asli comprise a number of different ethnic communities. Many tribes, both on the peninsula and in Borneo, were traditionally nomadic or semi-nomadic hunter—gatherers who practice animism, including the Punan, Penan and Senoi. However, their ancestral land and hunting grounds are commonly reclaimed by the state, shifting them to inferior land and sometimes pushing them out of their traditional way of life. One group of Orang Asli are called 'Negritos' and are deeply related to the ancestors of other modern East Asian people. They consist one of the earliest layers of population. Some Negrito sub-groups are now extinct, such as the Semang Bakau of Penang. Other bumiputera minorities to a lesser degree include the Malaysian Siamese, Khmers, Chams, Burmese and the Indian Muslims commonly known as Mamaks.

=== Non-Bumiputras ===
Minorities who lack Bumiputra status have established themselves in Malaysia. Those who are not considered to be Bumiputras make up a considerable portion of the Malaysian population – non-Malays once constituted around 50% of the population of peninsula Malaya (1947–1957), but have since declined in percentage term due to a higher birthrate of Malays owing to favorable policies by the government as well as some degree of out-migration by the Chinese. A large number of the non-Bumiputra arrived during the colonial period, but most of the non-Bumiputras were native-born by 1947 as large-scale immigration had effectively ceased by the late 1940s. Some Chinese families, known as Peranakan ("straits-born"), have resided in Malaysia since as far back as 15th century Malacca.

==== Chinese ====
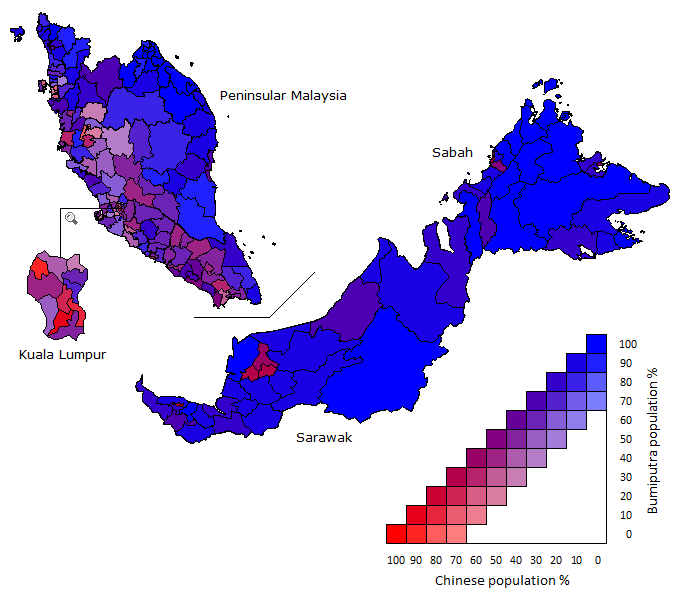
Malay Chinese

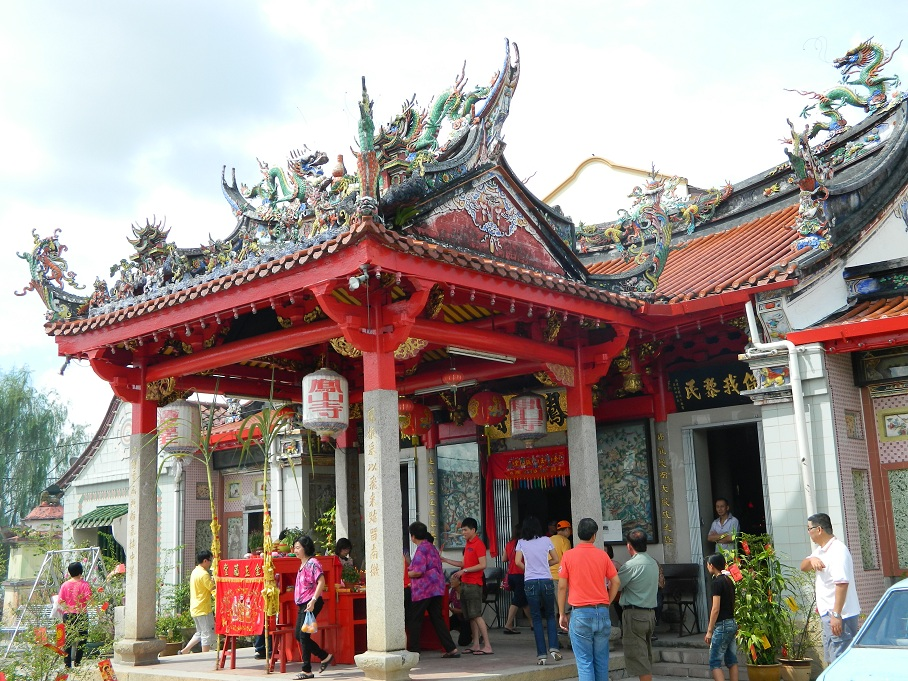
Malaysian Chinese in Perak

The second largest ethnic group at 6.69 million are the Chinese who make up 22.8% of the population excluding non-citizens as of 2022. They have been dominant in trade and business since the early 20th century. Malaysian Chinese businesses developed as part of the larger bamboo network, a network of overseas Chinese businesses operating in the markets of Southeast Asia that share common family and cultural ties. George Town, Ipoh and Iskandar Puteri are Chinese-majority cities, while Penang was the only state in Malaysia with a non-Bumiputera majority population. As of 2020, the Chinese comprised over 41% of Penang's population, making it the only state with a Chinese plurality. The Chinese have been settling in Malaysia for many centuries, as seen in the emergence of the Peranakan culture, but the exodus peaked during the nineteenth century through trading and tin-mining. When they first arrived, the Chinese often worked the most grueling jobs like tin mining and railway construction. Later on, some of them owned businesses that became large conglomerates in today's Malaysia. Most Chinese are Tao Buddhist and retain strong cultural ties to their ancestral homeland.

The first Chinese people to settle in the Straits Settlements, gradually adopted elements of Malayan culture, and some intermarried with the Malayan community. A distinct sub-ethnic group called babas (male) and nyonyas (female) emerged. Babas and nyonyas as a group are known as Peranakan. They produced a syncretic set of practices, beliefs, and arts, combining Malay and Chinese traditions in such a way as to create a new culture. The Peranakan culture is still visible to this day in the former Straits Settlements such as Singapore and Penang.

The Chinese community in Malaysia, depending on the predominant dialect in a particular region, speaks a variety of Chinese dialects including Mandarin, Hokkien, Cantonese, Hakka and Teochew. In certain regions in Malaysia, some dialects are more widely used; Hokkien predominates in Penang and Kedah, while most Chinese in the former centres of tin mining, such as Ipoh and Kuala Lumpur, speak Cantonese. More recently, however, with the standardised, compulsory use of Mandarin in Chinese schools, a huge majority of Malaysian Chinese now speak Mandarin, a non-native language that originated from northern China.

On the other hand, it was reported that up to 10% of Malaysian Chinese are primarily English-speaking. The English-speaking Chinese minority is typically concentrated in cities such as Kuala Lumpur, Petaling Jaya, Puchong, Subang Jaya, George Town and Ipoh. The English speakers form a distinct subset within the larger Chinese community, as they are known to have a less Sinocentric mindset, and are rather Westernized in thinking and attitudes.

==== Indian ====
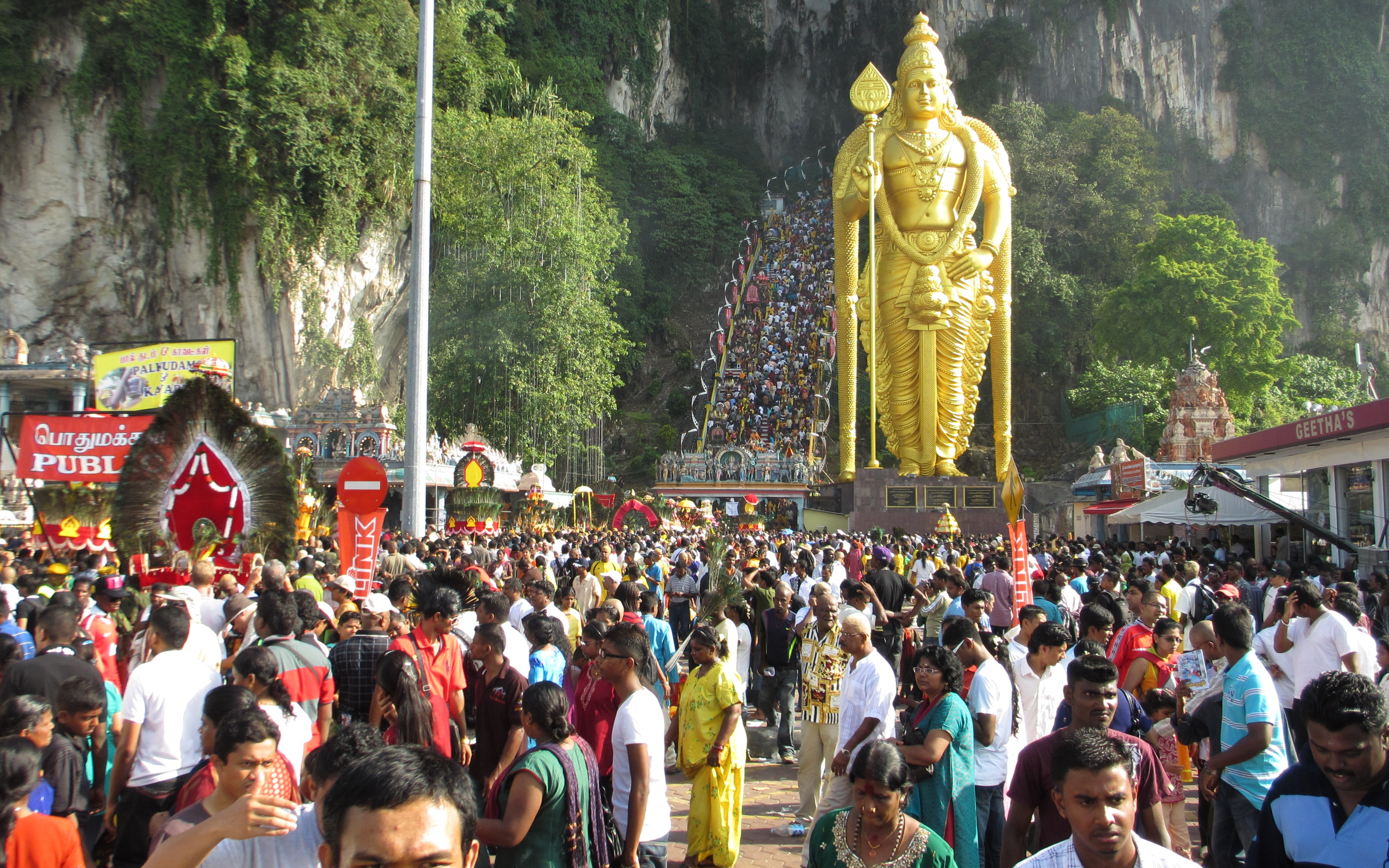
Malaysian Indians in Selangor

The 2.02 million Indian community in Malaysia is the smallest of the three main ethnic groups, comprising only 6.6% of the total population excluding non-citizens as of 2021. Indians were brought in to Malaysia during the British colonial period in late 18th century and early 19th centuries. During the British colonial rule, Indian labourers, who were mostly south Indian Tamils from Tamil Nadu and some Telugus and Malayalis from other parts of South India, were brought to Malaya to work on sugarcane and coffee plantations, rubber and oil palm estates, construction of buildings, railways, roads and bridges. Between 1800 to 1920, 740k Indians migrated to Malaysia.English-educated Ceylon Tamils from Ceylon (now Sri Lanka), and some Malaysian Telugus and Malayalees (from Kerala) were brought in to handle white-collar jobs. Kerala had the first mission schools in India and as such produced English educated administrators. Both ethnicities worked mainly as clerks, public servants, teachers, hospital assistants, doctors and in other skilled professions. As for the Punjabis from Punjab, most of them where enlisted in the army in Malaya while some handled the bullock-cart services in the country.

The Indians who came to Malaysia brought with them the Hindu religion, its unique temples called Kovils and the Sikhs with their Gurdwaras. Tamil cuisine is hugely popular. More than 86% of Malaysian Indians adhere to Hinduism. The Chitty community in Malacca are descendants of much earlier Indian immigrants who adopted local culture. Though they remain Hindu, the Chitties speak Bahasa Malaysia and women dress in sarong kebayas. The Hindu community celebrates two main festivals — Deepavali and Thaipusam — and many other smaller religious events each year. Both ethnic Telugu people and Malayalees from Andhra Pradesh and Kerala celebrate the Ugadi festival (new year) and Onam. The ethnic Punjabis celebrate Vasakhi, Lodi and Gurpurab. Majority of the Indians in Malaysia speak Tamil (also lingua franca among all Indians) while Telugu, Malayalam and Punjabi are also spoken by minorities.

==== Others ====
A small minority of Malaysians do not fit into the broader ethnic groups. A small population exists of people of European and Middle Eastern descent. Europeans and Middle Easterners, who first arrived during the colonial period, assimilated through intermarriage into the Christian and Muslim communities. Most Eurasian Malaysians trace their ancestry to British, Dutch and/or Portuguese colonists, and there is a strong Kristang community in Malacca.

The Nepalese are mostly migrant workers from Nepal totalling 356,199 of which Malaysian Citizens are as little over 600 and lives in Rawang, Selangor. Originally brought by the British as bodyguards and security personnel, Nepali population consist of Rana, Chettri, Rai and Gurung clans. Other minorities include Filipinos and Burmese. A small number of ethnic Vietnamese from Cambodia and Vietnam settled in Malaysia as Vietnam War refugees.

There is no general consensus on the ethnic profiling of children of mixed parentage. Some choose to be identified according to paternal ethnicity while others simply think that they fall in the "Others" category. The majority choose to identify themselves as Malay as long as either parent is Malay, mainly due to the legal definition of Bumiputra and the privileges that comes along with it. Children of Chinese–Indian parentage are known as Chindians. Though this is not an official category in national census data, it is an increasing number especially in urban areas due to the increasing ethnic Chinese-Indian relationships.

Many other people from around the world have moved to Malaysia. There are over 70,000 Africans who have emigrated to Malaysia.

== Languages ==
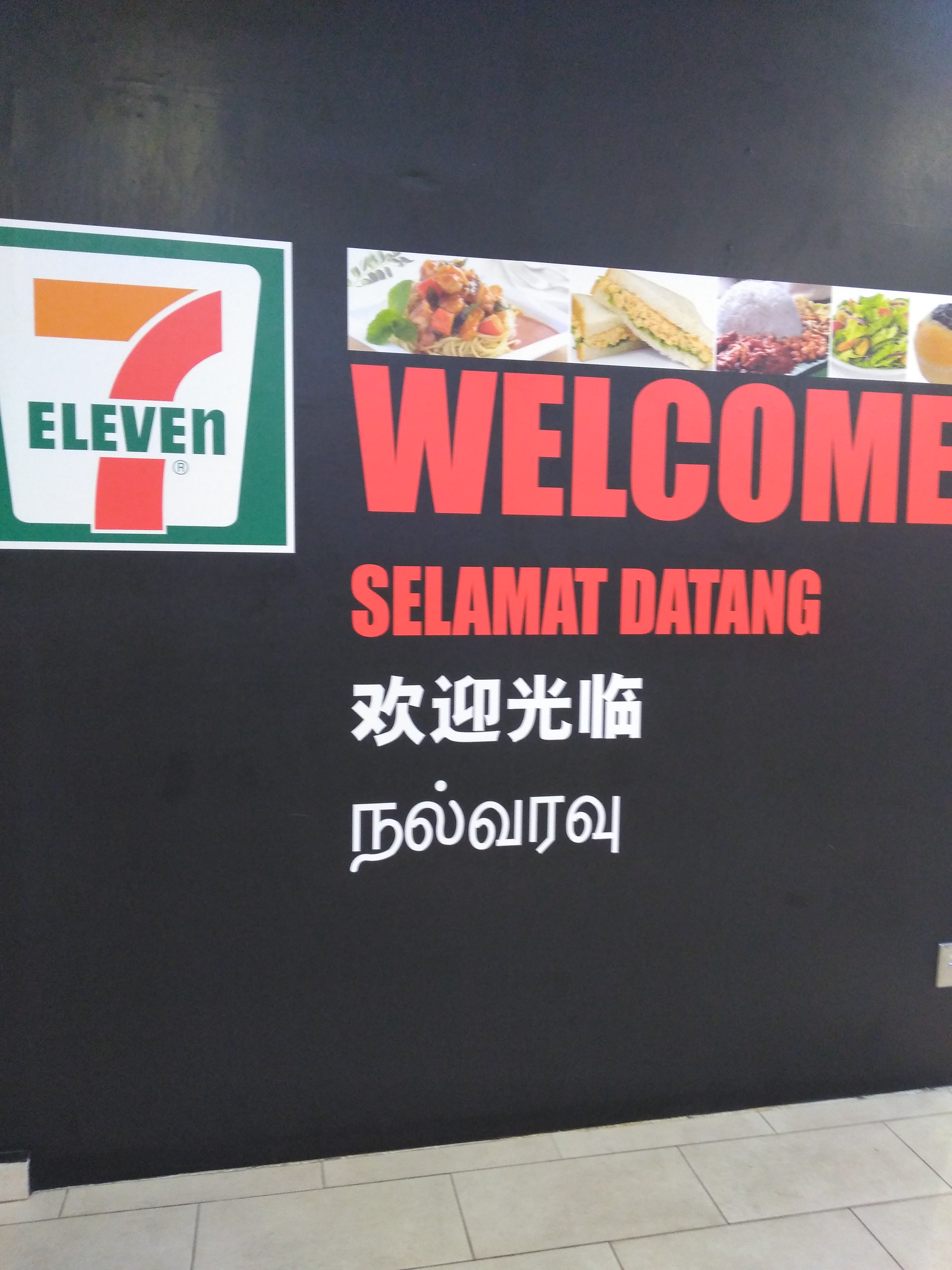
A sign at 7-Eleven stores showing common languages in Malaysia: English, Malay, Chinese, and Tamil

Malaysia contains speakers of 137 living languages, 41 of which are found in Peninsula Malaysia. The official language of Malaysia is known as Bahasa Malaysia, a standardised form of the Malay language. English was, for a protracted period, the de facto, administrative language of Malaysia, though its status was later rescinded. Despite that, English remains an active second language in many areas of Malaysian society and is taught as a compulsory subject in all public schools. Many businesses in Malaysia conduct their transactions in English, and it is sometimes used in official correspondence. Examinations are based on British English, although there has been much American influence through television.

Malaysian English, also known as Malaysian Standard English (MySE), is a form of English derived from British English, although there is little official use of the term, except with relation to education. Malaysian English also sees wide use in business, along with Manglish, which is a colloquial form of English with heavy Malay, Chinese languages and Tamil influences. Most Malaysians are conversant in English, although some are only fluent in the Manglish form. The Malaysian government officially discourages the use of Manglish.

Malaysian Chinese mostly speak Chinese languages from the southern provinces of China. The more common languages in Peninsular Malaysia are Hokkien, Cantonese, Hakka, Teochew, Hainanese, and Hokchiu. In Sarawak, most ethnic Chinese speak either Fuzhounese or Hakka while Hakka predominates in Sabah except in the city of Sandakan where Cantonese is more often spoken despite the Hakka-origins of the Chinese residing there. Hokkien is mostly spoken in Penang, Kedah and Perlis, whereas Cantonese is mostly spoken in Ipoh and Kuala Lumpur. However, in Malaysia as a whole, the majority of ethnic Chinese now speak Mandarin, a non-native language from northern China (originally spoken by the Beijing elite and chosen as the official language of China), as their first language, while English is the first language for the rest. Some of the less-spoken languages such as Hainanese are facing extinction. As with Malaysian youths of other races, most Chinese youth are multilingual and can speak up to four languages with at least moderate fluency – their native Chinese language, Mandarin, English and Malay.

Tamil is the most common language spoken among Indians in Malaysia, especially in Peninsular Malaysia where they still maintain close cultural ties with their homeland Tamil Nadu & Ceylon. This is because there are far fewer Indians in East Malaysia than in the Peninsula. Tamil community from Ceylon have their own Tamil dialect known as Sri Lankan Tamil. Besides Tamil, the Malayalam Language is spoken by over 200,000 Malayalees in Malaysia, predominantly in Perak, Selangor, Negeri Sembilan and Johore. Telugu is also spoken by the Telugu community. Punjabi language is commonly spoken by the Punjabi community. Besides that, Sinhala is used by a small number of Sinhalese community from Sri Lanka.

Citizens of Minangkabau, Bugis or Javanese origins, who can be classified "Malay" under constitutional definitions may also speak their respective ancestral tongues. The native tribes of East Malaysia have their own languages which are related to, but easily distinguishable from, Malay. The Iban is the main tribal language in Sarawak while Dusunic languages are spoken by the natives in Sabah. A variant of the Malay language that is spoken in Brunei is also commonly spoken in both states.

Some Malaysians have Caucasian ancestry and speak creole languages, such as the Portuguese-based Malaccan Creoles, and the Spanish-based Zamboangueño Chavacano. Thai is also spoken in some areas.

== Citizenship ==
Citizenship is usually granted by lex soli. Citizenship in the states of Sabah and Sarawak in Malaysian Borneo are distinct from citizenship in Peninsular Malaysia for immigration purposes. Every citizen is issued a biometric smart chip identity card, known as MyKad, at the age of 12, and must carry the card at all times.

== Religion ==
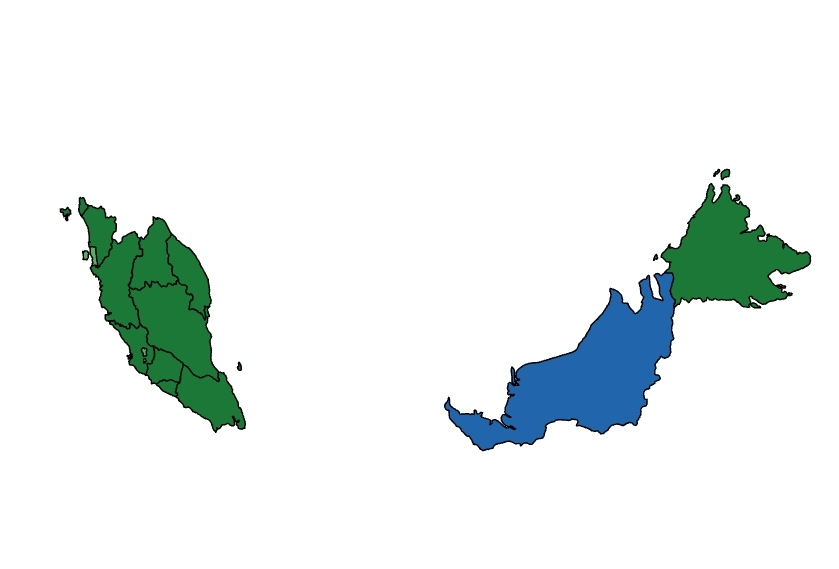
Dominant religious confessions in Malaysia according to 2020 census. Dark green: Muslim majority > 50% Light green: Muslim plurality < 50% Blue: Christian majority > 50%

Islam is the largest and state religion of Malaysia, although Malaysia is a multi-religious society and the Malaysian constitution guarantees religious freedom. Despite the recognition of Islam as the state religion, the first 4 prime ministers have stressed that Malaysia could function as a secular state. According to the Population and Housing Census 2020 figures, approximately 63.5 percent of the population practised Islam; 18.7 percent Buddhism; 9.1 percent Christianity; 6.1 percent Hinduism; and 2.7 percent practise other religions or reported having no religion or did not provide any information. The percentage population of Muslims has been steadily increasing – from 58.6% in 1991, 60.4% in 2000, 61.5% in 2010, to 63.5% of the 2020 census.

The majority of Malaysian Indians follow Hinduism (84.5%), with a significant minority identifying as Christians (7.7%), Sikhs (3.9%), Muslims (3.8%), and 1,000 Jains. Most Malaysian Chinese follow a combination of Buddhism, Taoism, Confucianism and ancestor-worship but, when pressed to specify their religion, will identify themselves as Buddhists. Statistics from the 2000 Census indicate that 75.9% of Malaysia's ethnic Chinese identify as Buddhist, with significant numbers of adherents following Taoism (10.6%) and Christianity (9.6%), along with small Hui-Muslim populations in areas like Penang. Christianity constitutes a slim majority of the non-Malay Bumiputra community (50.1%) with an additional 36.3% identifying as Muslims while 7.3% follow folk religion.

=== Islam ===
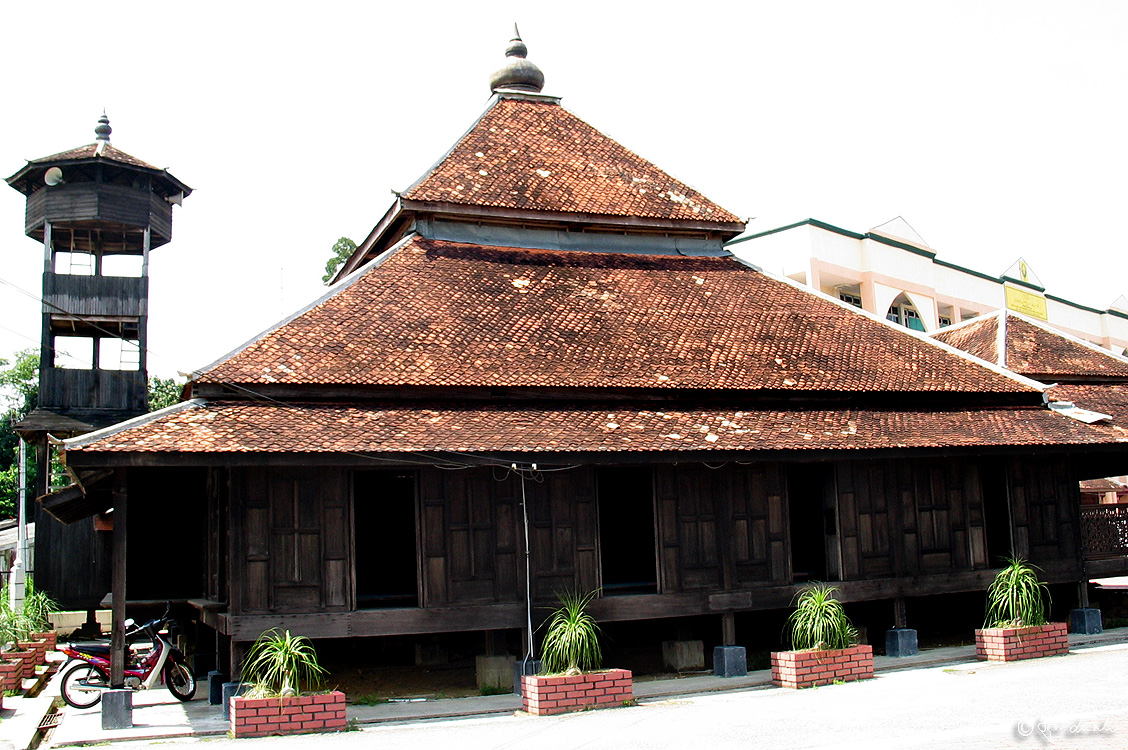
Kampung Laut Mosque in Tumpat is one of the oldest mosques in Malaysia, dating to early 18th century

Islam is thought to have been brought to Malaysia around the 12th century by Arab traders. Since then the religion has become the predominant religion of the country and is recognised as the state's official religion. All ethnic Malays are considered Muslim by Article 160 of the Constitution of Malaysia.

Muslims are obliged to follow the decisions of Syariah courts in matters concerning their religion. The Islamic judges are expected to follow the Shafi`i legal school of Islam, which is the main madh'hab of Malaysia. The jurisdiction of Shariah courts is limited only to Muslims in matters such as marriage, inheritance, divorce, apostasy, religious conversion, and custody among others. No other criminal or civil offences are under the jurisdiction of the Shariah courts, which have a similar hierarchy to the Civil Courts. Despite being the supreme courts of the land, the Civil Courts (including the Federal Court) do not hear matters related to Islamic practices, as ratified by Mahathir Mohamad in the late 1980s. Regulation of sexual activities among the Muslim population is strict; with laws prohibiting unmarried couples from occupying a secluded area or a confined space to prevent suspicion of acts forbidden in Islam.

== Education ==
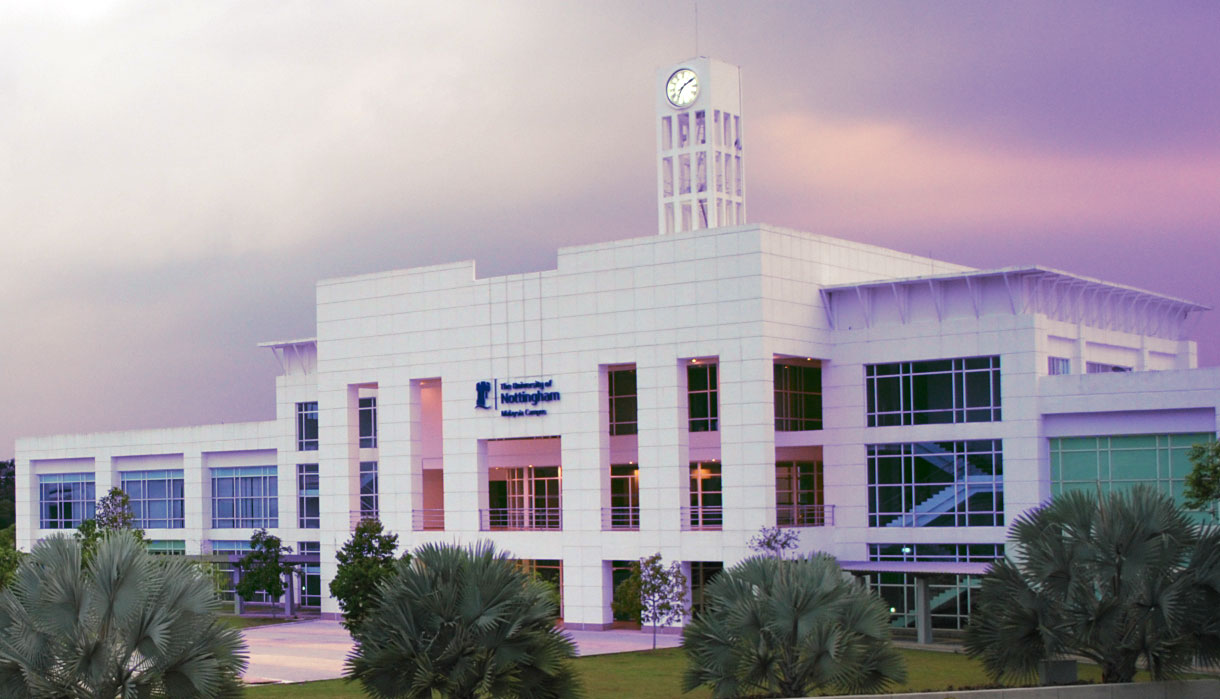
Malaysia campus of the University of Nottingham at Semenyih, Selangor

Literacy rates (percentage of people over 15 who can read and write) are high in Malaysia, with an overall literacy rate of 88.7%. Literacy rates are higher among males (92%) than females (85.4%)

Education in Malaysia is monitored by the federal government Ministry of Education. The education system features a non-compulsory kindergarten education followed by six years of compulsory primary education, and five years of optional secondary education. Most Malaysian children start schooling between the ages of three and six, in kindergarten.

=== Primary education ===
Children begin primary schooling at the age of seven for a period of six years. Primary schools are divided into two categories, national primary schools and vernacular school. Vernacular schools (Sekolah Jenis Kebangsaan) use either Chinese or Tamil as the medium of instruction, whereas national primary schools (Sekolah Kebangsaan) uses Bahasa Malaysia as the medium of instruction for subjects except English, Science and Mathematics.

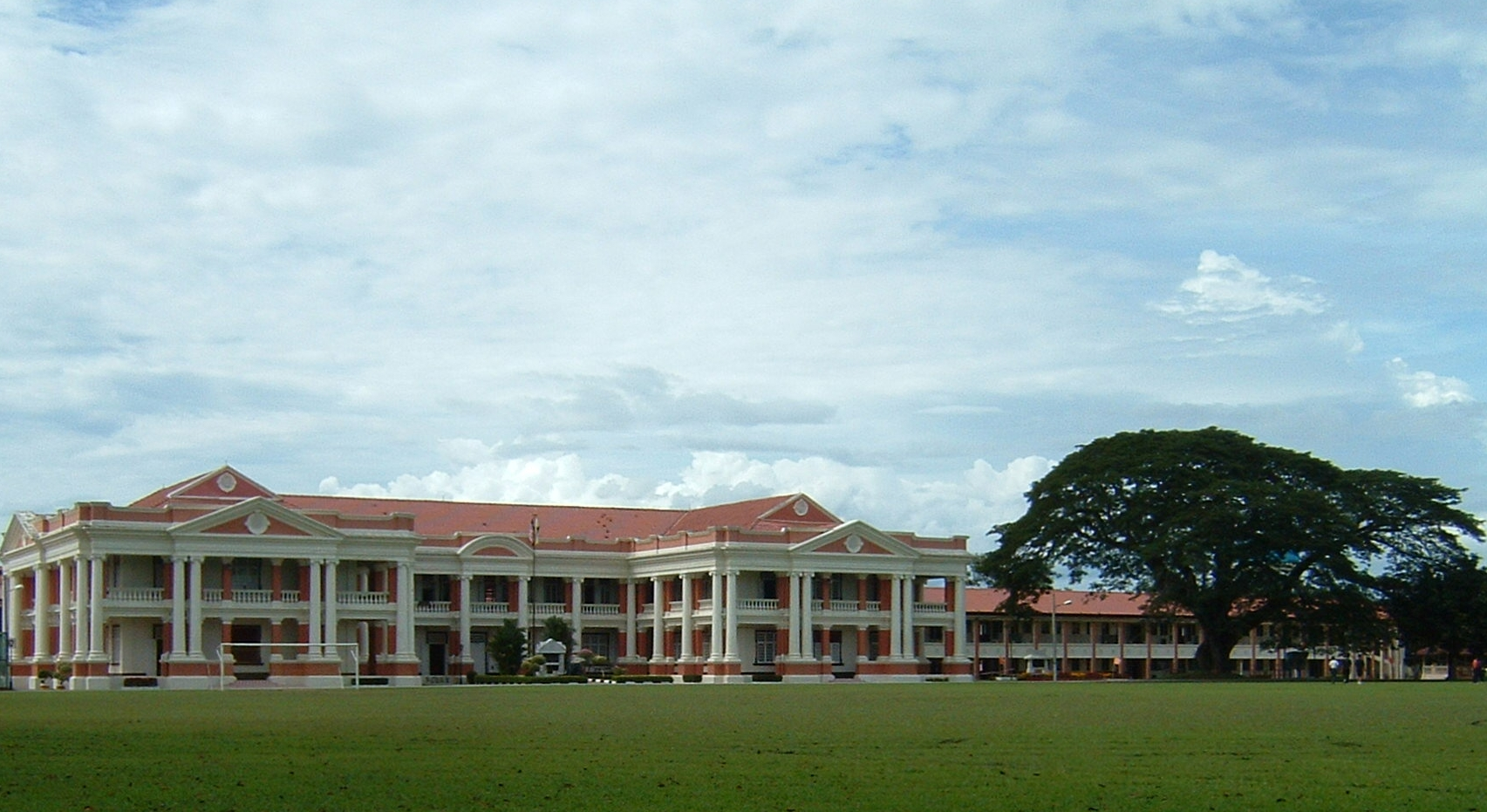
Malay College Kuala Kangsar (MCKK) is one of the earliest boarding schools established in British Malaya.

Before progressing to the secondary level of education, pupils in Year 6 are required to sit the Primary School Achievement Test (Ujian Pencapaian Sekolah Rendah, UPSR). A programme called First Level Assessment (Penilaian Tahap Satu, PTS) taken during Primary Year 3 was abolished in 2001.

=== Secondary education ===
Secondary education in Malaysia is conducted in secondary schools (Sekolah Menengah Kebangsaan) for five years. National secondary schools use Malay as the main language of instruction. The only exceptions are Mathematics and Science and languages other than Malay, however this was only implemented in 2003, prior to which all non-language subjects were taught in Malay. At the end of Form Three, which is the third year, students are evaluated in the Form Three Assessment ("Pentaksiran Tingkatan Tiga", PT3)（ now abolished ）. Secondary students no longer sit for PMR in Form Three that has been abolished in 2014. In the final year of secondary education (Form Five), students sit the Malaysian Certificate of Education (Sijil Pelajaran Malaysia, SPM) examination, which is equivalent to the former British Ordinary or 'O' Levels. The government has decided to abandon the use of English in teaching maths and science and revert to Bahasa Malaysia, starting in 2012.

Malaysian national secondary schools are sub-divided into several types: National Secondary School (Sekolah Menengah Kebangsaan), Religious Secondary School (Sekolah Menengah Agama), National-Type Secondary School (Sekolah Menengah Jenis Kebangsaan) (also referred to as Mission Schools), Technical Schools (Sekolah Menengah Teknik), Residential Schools and MARA Junior Science College (Maktab Rendah Sains MARA).

There are also 60 Chinese Independent High Schools in Malaysia, where most subjects are taught in Chinese. Chinese Independent High Schools are monitored and standardised by the United Chinese School Committees' Association of Malaysia (UCSCAM). However, unlike government schools, independent schools are autonomous. It takes six years to complete secondary education in Chinese independent schools. Students will sit a standardised test conducted by UCSCAM, which is known as the Unified Examination Certificate (UEC) in Junior Middle 3 (equivalent to PMR) and Senior Middle 3 (equivalent to A level). A number of independent schools conduct classes in Malay and English in addition to Chinese, enabling the students to sit the PMR and SPM additionally.

=== Tertiary education ===
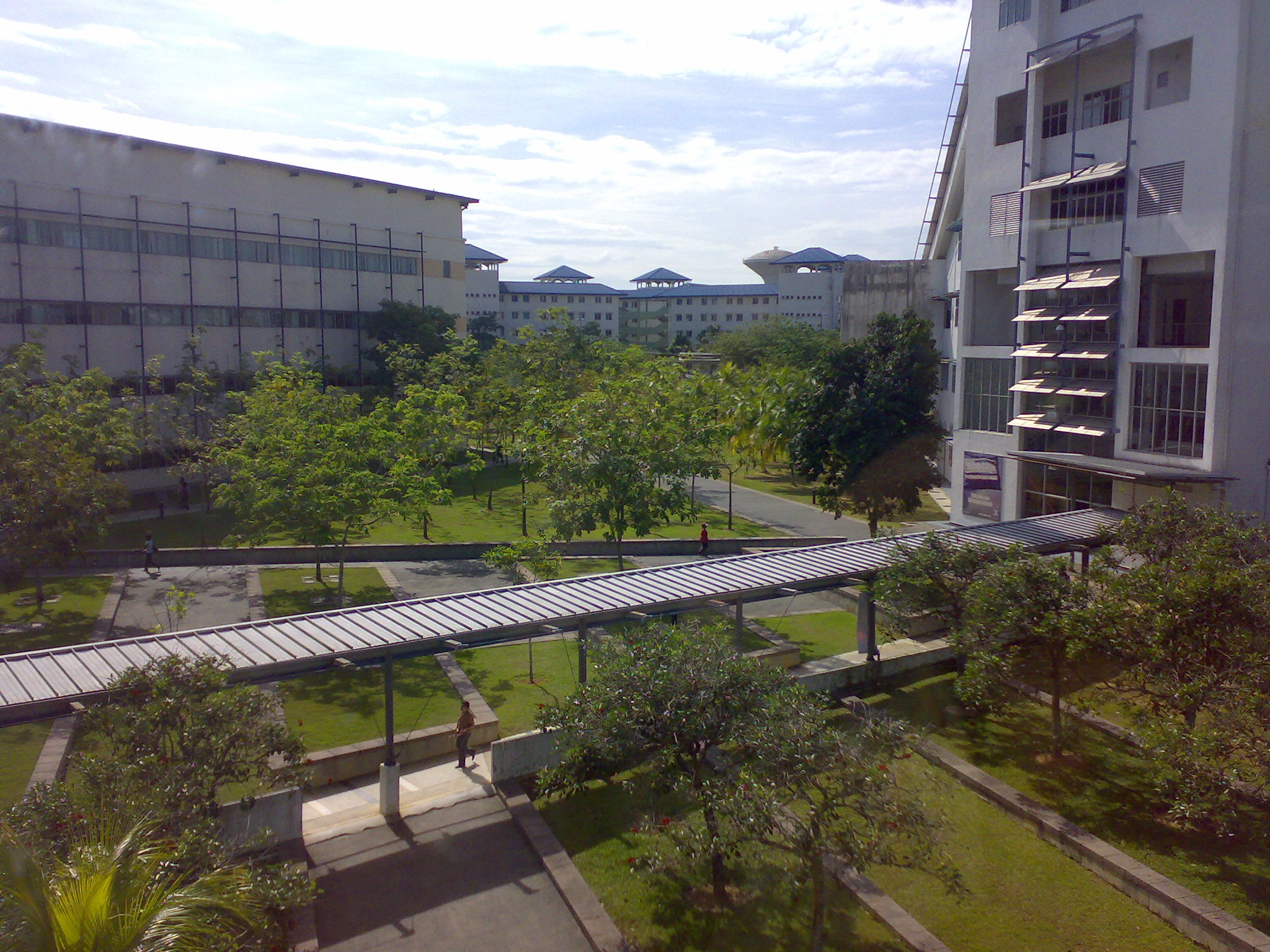
An aerial view of Multimedia University's Cyberjaya campus. Multimedia University is Malaysia's first private university.

Before the introduction of the matriculation system, students aiming to enter public universities had to complete an additional 18 months of secondary schooling in Form Six and sit the Malaysian Higher School Certificate (Sijil Tinggi Persekolahan Malaysia, STPM); equivalent to the British Advanced or 'A' levels. Since the introduction of the matriculation programme as an alternative to STPM in 1999, students who completed the 12-month programme in matriculation colleges (kolej matrikulasi in Malay) can enrol in local universities. However, in the matriculation system, only 10 per cent of the places are open to non-Bumiputra students.

There are a number of government-funded public universities in Malaysia, the most prominent of them being University of Malaya. Although the ethnic quota system favouring Bumiputras at such universities was abolished in 2002, disparity of student intake still exists in these universities with underrepresentation of non-Bumiputras. Instead, private universities have sprung up to cater to the local population. These private universities are also gaining a reputation for international quality education and students from all over the world attend these universities. In addition, four reputable international universities have set up their branch campuses in Malaysia since 1998. A branch campus can be seen as an 'offshore campus' of the foreign university, which offers the same courses and awards as the main campus. Both local and international students can acquire these identical foreign qualifications in Malaysia at a lower fee. The foreign university branch campuses in Malaysia are: Monash University Malaysia Campus, Curtin University, Malaysia, Swinburne University of Technology Sarawak Campus and University of Nottingham Malaysia Campus.

Students also have the option of enrolling in private tertiary institutions after secondary studies. Most institutions have educational links with overseas universities especially in the United States, the United Kingdom and Australia, allowing students to spend a portion of their course duration abroad as well as getting overseas qualifications. One such example is Tunku Abdul Rahman University College which partnered with Sheffield Hallam University and Coventry University.

=== International schools ===
In addition to the Malaysian National Curriculum, Malaysia has many international schools such as The International School Kuala Lumpur, Alice Smith School, Gardens International School, Cempaka Schools Malaysia, Kolej Tuanku Ja'afar...etc. These schools cater to the growing expatriate population in the country and the Malaysians who want a foreign curriculum, UK based curriculum, English education or Australian curriculum as well.

== Health ==
The Malaysian government places importance on the expansion and development of health care, putting 5% of the government social sector development budget into public health care—an increase of more than 47% over the previous figure. This has meant an overall increase of more than RM 2 billion. With a rising and ageing population, the Government wishes to improve in many areas including the refurbishment of existing hospitals, building and equipping new hospitals, expansion of the number of polyclinics, and improvements in training and expansion of telehealth. A major problem with the health care sector is the lack of medical centres for rural areas, which the government is trying to counter through the development of and expansion of a system called "tele-primary care". Another issue is the overprescription of drugs, though this has decreased in recent years. Since 2009 the Malaysian Health Ministry has increased its efforts to overhaul the system and attract more foreign investment.

The country generally has an efficient and widespread system of health care. It implements a universal healthcare system, which co-exists with the private healthcare system. Infant mortality rate in 2009 was 6 deaths per 1000 births, and life expectancy at birth in 2009 was 75 years. Malaysia has the highest levels of obesity among Malay population in ASEAN countries.

The Malaysian health care system requires doctors to perform a compulsory three years service with public hospitals to ensure that the manpower in these hospitals is maintained. Recently foreign doctors have also been encouraged to take up employment in Malaysia. There is still, however, a significant shortage in the medical workforce, especially of highly trained specialists; thus, certain medical care and treatment are available only in large cities. Recent efforts to bring many facilities to other towns have been hampered by lack of expertise to run the available equipment.

The majority of private hospitals are in urban areas and, unlike many of the public hospitals, are equipped with the latest diagnostic and imaging facilities. Private hospitals have not generally been seen as an ideal investment—it has often taken up to ten years before companies have seen any profits. However, the situation has now changed and companies are now exploring this area again, corresponding with the increased number of foreigners entering Malaysia for medical care and the recent government focus on developing the health tourism industry. The Government has also been trying to promote Malaysia as a health care destination, regionally and internationally.

== See also ==
- Immigration to Malaysia
- Project IC, corruption & electoral demographics
