= Phạm Khắc Rậu =

Vietnamese lawyer and diplomat (1921–2002)

Personal details
- Born: April 30, 1921 Nam Định, Tonkin, French Indochina
- Died: May 30, 2002 (aged 81) Washington, D.C., United States

Phạm Khắc Rậu (30 April 1921 – 30 May 2002) was a Vietnamese lawyer and diplomat who served as the Consul of the State of Vietnam and the Republic of Vietnam in Singapore, concurrently the Chargé d'Affaires in Malaya.

Phạm Khắc Rậu was born in Nam Định, northern Vietnam, on April 30, 1921. His name "Rậu" was derived from the year of his birth (Year of the Rooster (Note: 酉 (Vietnamese: Dậu))). In 1942, he graduated from the Law Faculty of the University of Hanoi.

In 1954, Phạm Khắc Rậu was appointed as the first Consul of the State of Vietnam (later the Republic of Vietnam, widely known as South Vietnam) in Singapore, and from 1957 onwards, he concurrently served as the Chargé d'Affaires in Malaya.

Later, he also held positions such as Acting Chargé d'Affaires of the Republic of Vietnam Embassy in the United States.

Phạm Khắc Rậu died on 30 May 2002 in Washington, D.C., United States.

== Personal life ==
Phạm Khắc Rậu was married and had four children.
