= Bidong Island =

Island in Kuala Nerus, Terengganu, Malaysia

Native name: Pulau Bidong ڤولاو بيدوڠ Pula Bidong
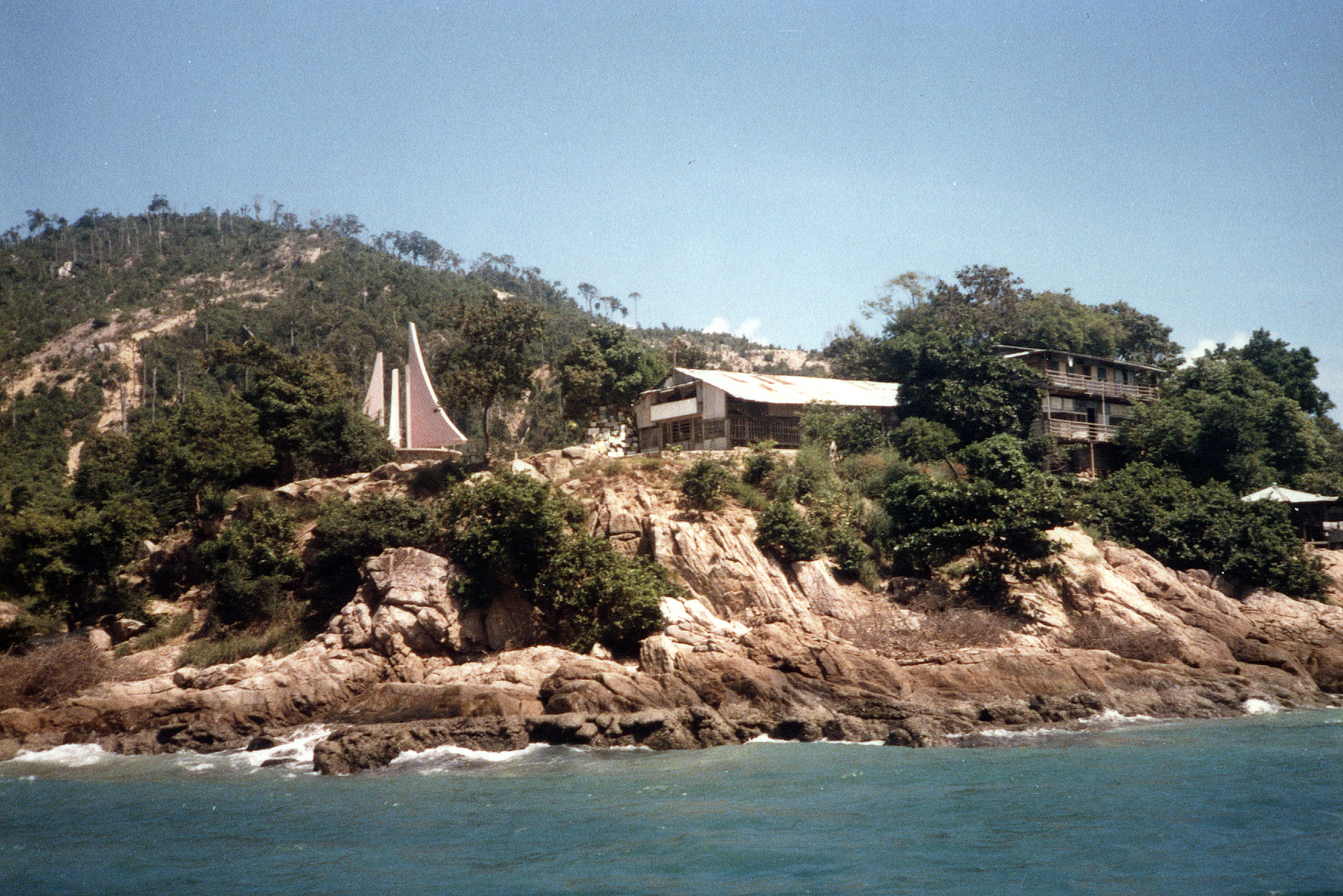
- Landscape of Bidong Island
- Interactive map of Bidong Island

Geography
- Location: South China Sea
- Coordinates: 5°37′N 103°4′E
- Archipelago: Redang Islands
- Area: 2.44 km^{2} (0.94 sq mi)

Administration
- Malaysia
- State: Terengganu
- District: Kuala Nerus
- Mukim: Redang Islands

Additional information
- Time zone: MST (UTC+8)

Bidong Island (Malay: Pulau Bidong, Terengganuan Pula Bidong) is an island 260 ha (640 acres) in area in Kuala Nerus District, Terengganu, Malaysia in the South China Sea. Bidong Island is accessible from the coastal town of Merang in Setiu district. From 1978 until 2005 Bidong Island was a refugee camp with a population reaching at its peak as many as 40,000 Vietnamese refugees. A total of about 250,000 refugees were residents of the camp during the period of its operation. Most stayed on Bidong a few months or longer and were resettled abroad in third countries, especially the United States.

== Vietnamese refugees ==
On 30 April 1975, the Vietnam War ended with the evacuation of the American Embassy and the fall of Saigon to the North Vietnamese Army. Millions of people tried to flee the new Communist rule in Vietnam. In May 1975, the first boat with 47 refugees arrived in Malaysia from Vietnam. They were called “boat people.” However, the number of boat people fleeing Vietnam was relatively small until 1978. Bidong Island was officially opened as a refugee camp on 8 August 1978 with 121 Vietnamese refugees. The capacity of the camp was said to be 4,500. Another 600 refugees arrived in August and thereafter the arrival of boats from Vietnam was a near daily occurrence. By January 1979, there were 40,000 Vietnamese on the island and by June 1979 it was said to be the most densely populated place on earth with about 40,000 refugees crowded into a flat area hardly larger than a football field.

The passage from Vietnam was hazardous and the refugee boats were small, overloaded, and often attacked by pirates. Thousands of refugees died at sea; rape and abduction of refugee women was common. In addition, the governments of Malaysia and other Southeast Asian countries discouraged refugees from landing on their shores. Refugee boats were often pushed offshore or towed to Bidong and other designated camps.

Conditions on Bidong were difficult. One visitor, Leo Cherne, called Bidong "Hell Isle." Refugees crowded onto the island "lived in makeshift huts two and three stories high made of salvaged timbers from wrecked boats, plastic sheets, tin cans, and corrugated iron sheets." Latrines and wells were inadequate; tropical rainstorms sent rivers of filthy water through the camp; all food and clean water had to be imported from the mainland. Water was rationed at one gallon per day per person. Doctors were abundant, but medicine was in short supply. Sanitation was nearly non-existent and hepatitis was rampant." But the refugee population was well organised and many small businesses and an efficient food and water distribution system was set up. Aid organisations such as the Malaysian Red Crescent Society, the United Nations High Commissioner for Refugees and many non-governmental organisations assisted the refugees. An international volunteer staff of medical personnel tended to the refugee's health problems. Immigration officials from many countries visited the island to interview refugees for resettlement abroad.

The arrival of new refugees to Bidong and other locations in Southeast Asia decreased after June 1979. A Geneva Convention held in July 1979 resulted in Vietnam agreeing to restrain the flow of refugees and the Southeast Asian countries agreeing to take all those who came to their shores provided that the Western countries guaranteed resettlement for the majority of them. President Jimmy Carter raised the quota for permitting Indochinese into the United States from 7,000 to 14,000 per month and other countries followed suit, especially Canada, Australia, and France. The population of Bidong began to decline as refugees departed for resettlement abroad.

By the time Bidong was closed as a refugee camp on 30 October 1991, about 250,000 Vietnamese had passed through or resided in the camp. With the closing of the camp, the remaining refugees in Malaysia were repatriated back to Vietnam. The refugees strongly protested their forced repatriation. A total of 9,000 Vietnamese were repatriated between 1991 and 28 August 2005 when the last refugees departed for Vietnam. In 1999, the island was opened to tourism. It has regained its former pristine beauty and many former refugees have revisited their old home.

After the departure of the refugees, the Marine Research Station of Universiti Malaysia Terengganu's was established on the island. The station has living quarters and laboratories for students and researchers to study marine ecosystems.

== Landscapes ==
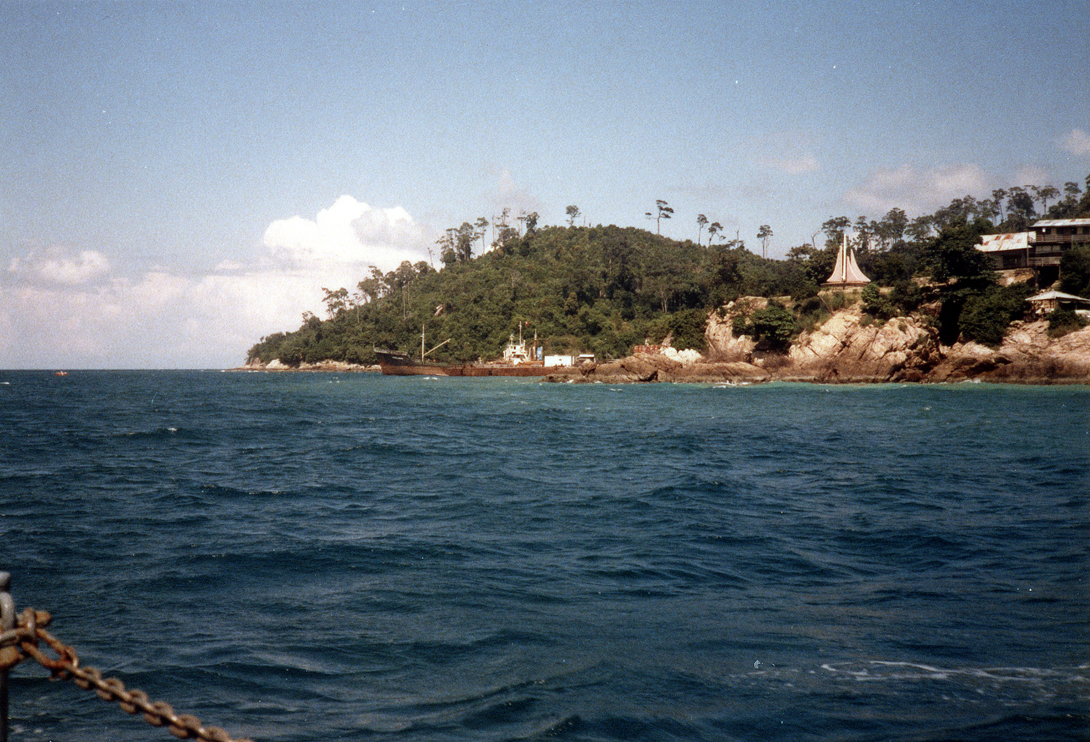

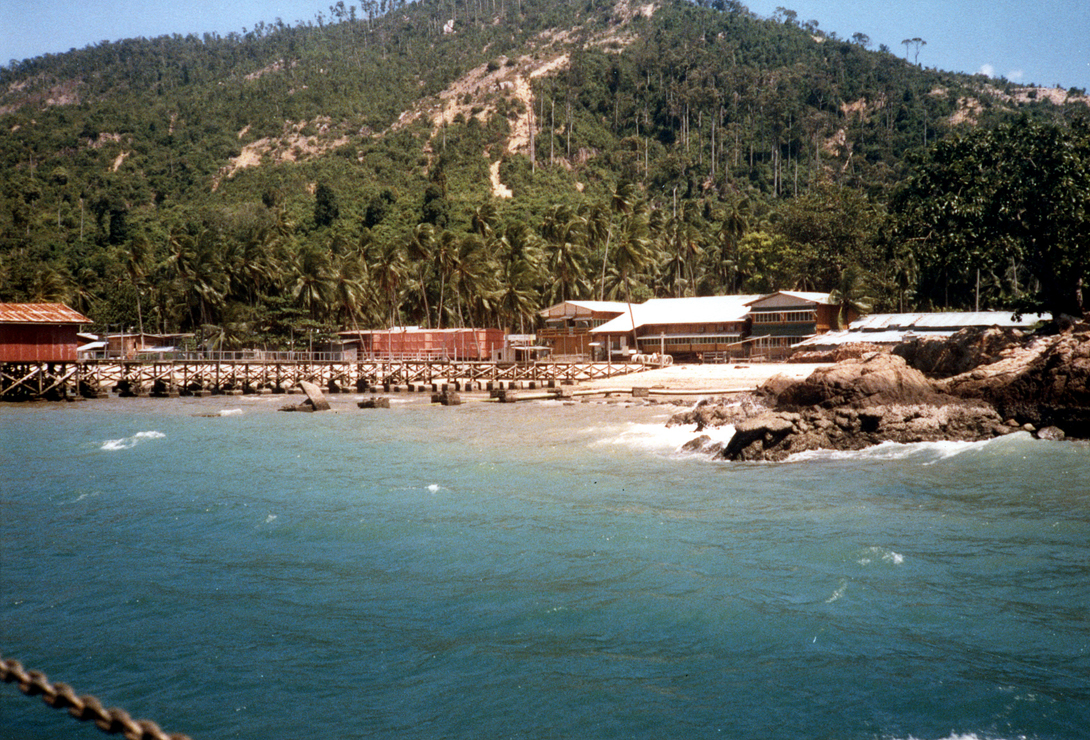

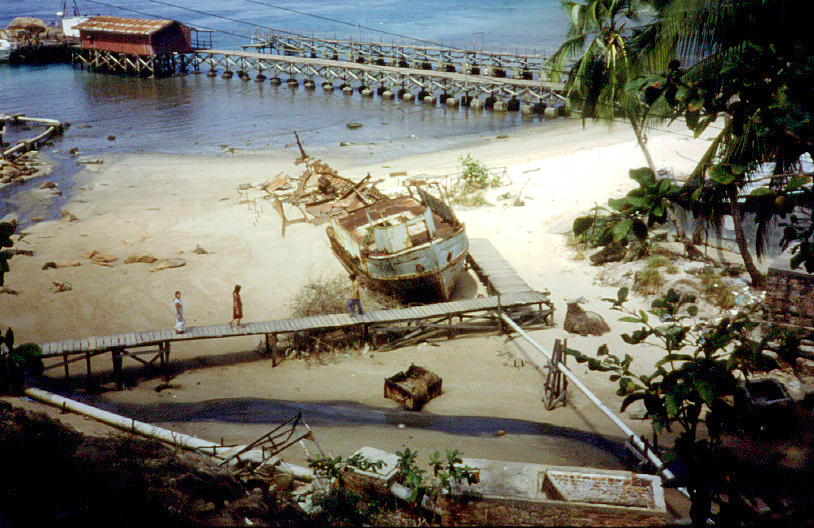

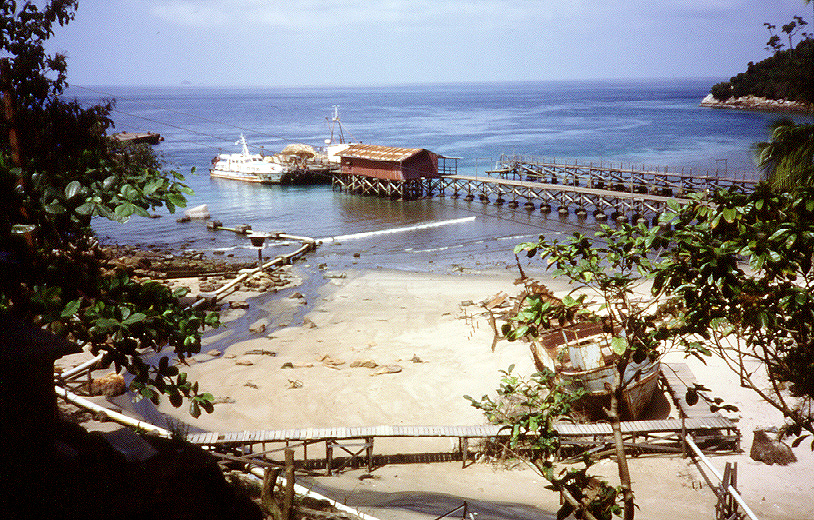

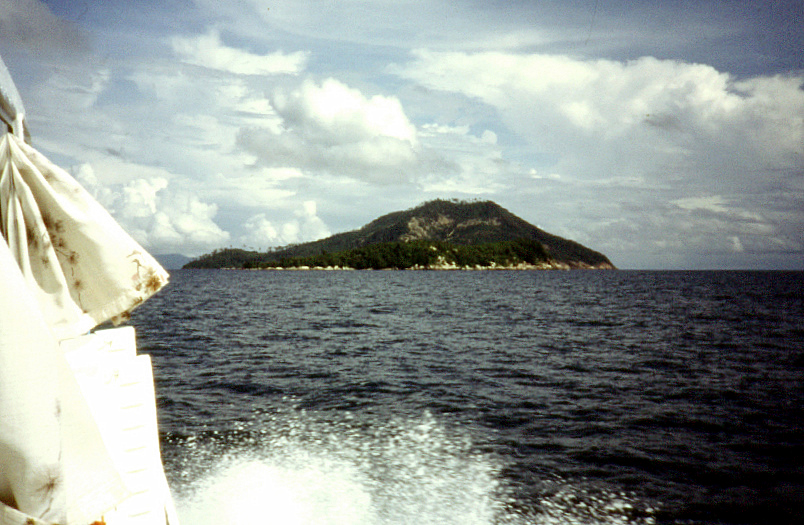

== See also ==
- List of islands of Malaysia
