= Malaysian Malayalees =

Malayalee diaspora in Malaysia

Malaysian Malayalees മലേഷ്യ മലയാളികൾ
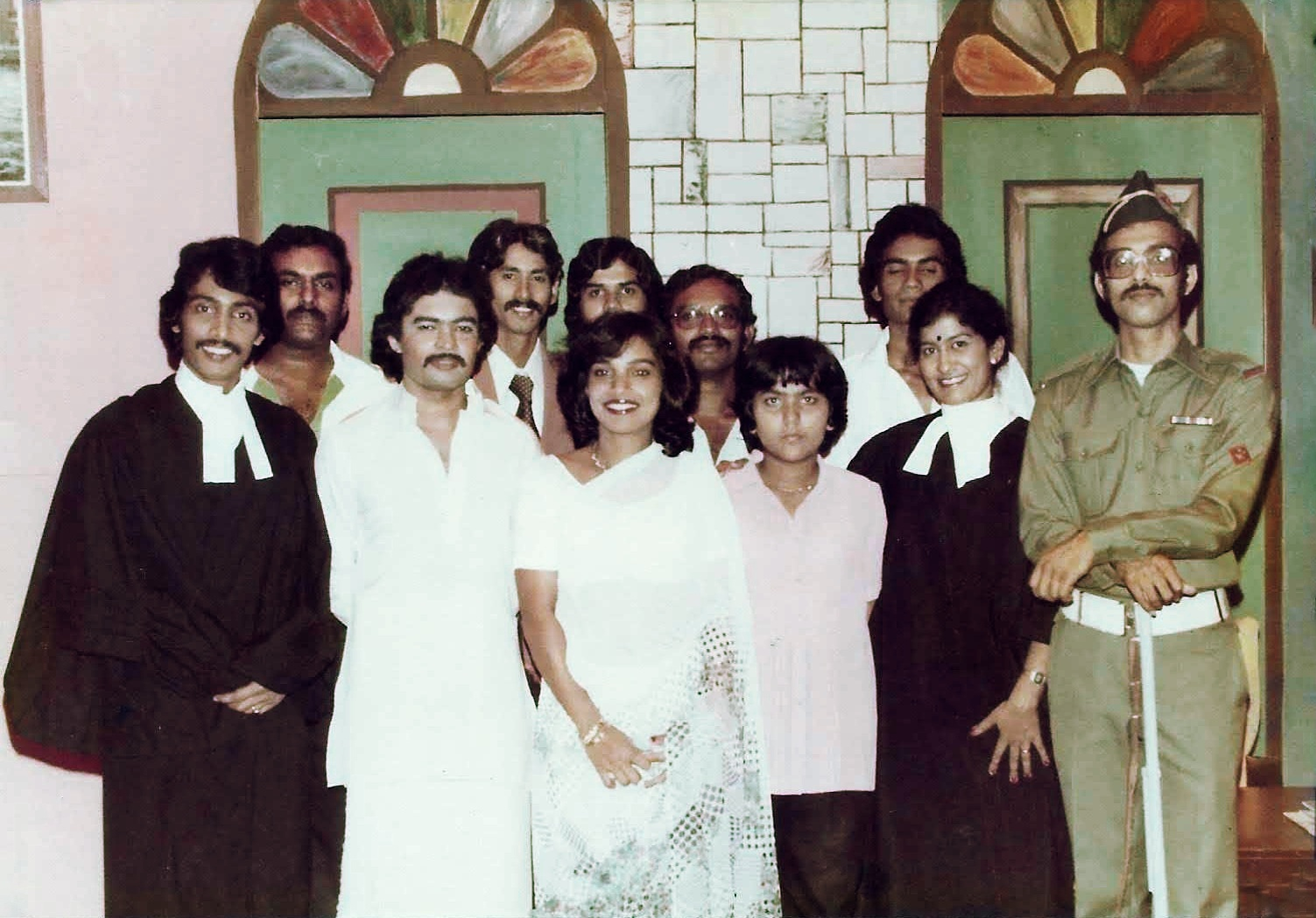
- Malayalee youths of Selangor after performing a Malayalam social stage drama (1982)

Total population
- Approximately 344,000 (≈15.5% of Malaysian Indians)

Regions with significant populations
- Malaysia (West Coast of Peninsular Malaysia)

Languages
- Malayalam, Tamil, English and Malay

Religion
- Predominantly: Hinduism; Minority: Islam Christianity

Related ethnic groups
- Malayali, Malaysian Indians

Malaysian Malayalees, also known as Malayalee Malaysians, are people of Malayali descent who were born in or immigrated to Malaysia from the Malayalam speaking regions of Kerala. They are the second largest Indian ethnic group, making up approximately 15% of the Malaysian Indian population. The bulk of Malaysian Malayali migration began during the British Raj, when the British facilitated the migration of Indian workers to work in plantations, but unlike the majority Tamils, the vast majority of the Malayalis were recruited as supervisors (called mandur) in the oil palm estates that followed the kangani system, and some were into trading and small businesses with a significant proportion of them running groceries or restaurants. Over 90% of the Malayalee population in Malaysia are Malaysian citizens.

== History ==
=== Before 19th century ===
Despite their similar spellings in the Latin script, Malay and Malayali are believed to be false cognates: the former comes from the Malay (Austronesian) word "melaju" meaning "accelerate", describing the flow of a river in Sumatra that eventually gave its name to the Malay people, while the latter comes from the Malayalam (Dravidian) words "mala alam" meaning "mountain region".

The people of the Malay Peninsula begin receiving influences of South India around the 4th century, mainly through trading. However, the arrival of Alfonso de Albuquerque along with 800 Portuguese and 600 Malabari fighting men from Cochin during the Capture of Malacca in 1511 had the earliest records that clearly state the arrival of Malayalees in the Malay Peninsula.

When Penang was founded by Francis Light in 1786, many notable government buildings and roads were built by convict labourers from Malabar. Thus, the migration of these labourers led to the existence of areas such as Kampung Kaka and Kampung Malabar in the Penang Island. Many Indian Muslim merchants in Penang were Malabaris.

=== 19th and 20th centuries ===
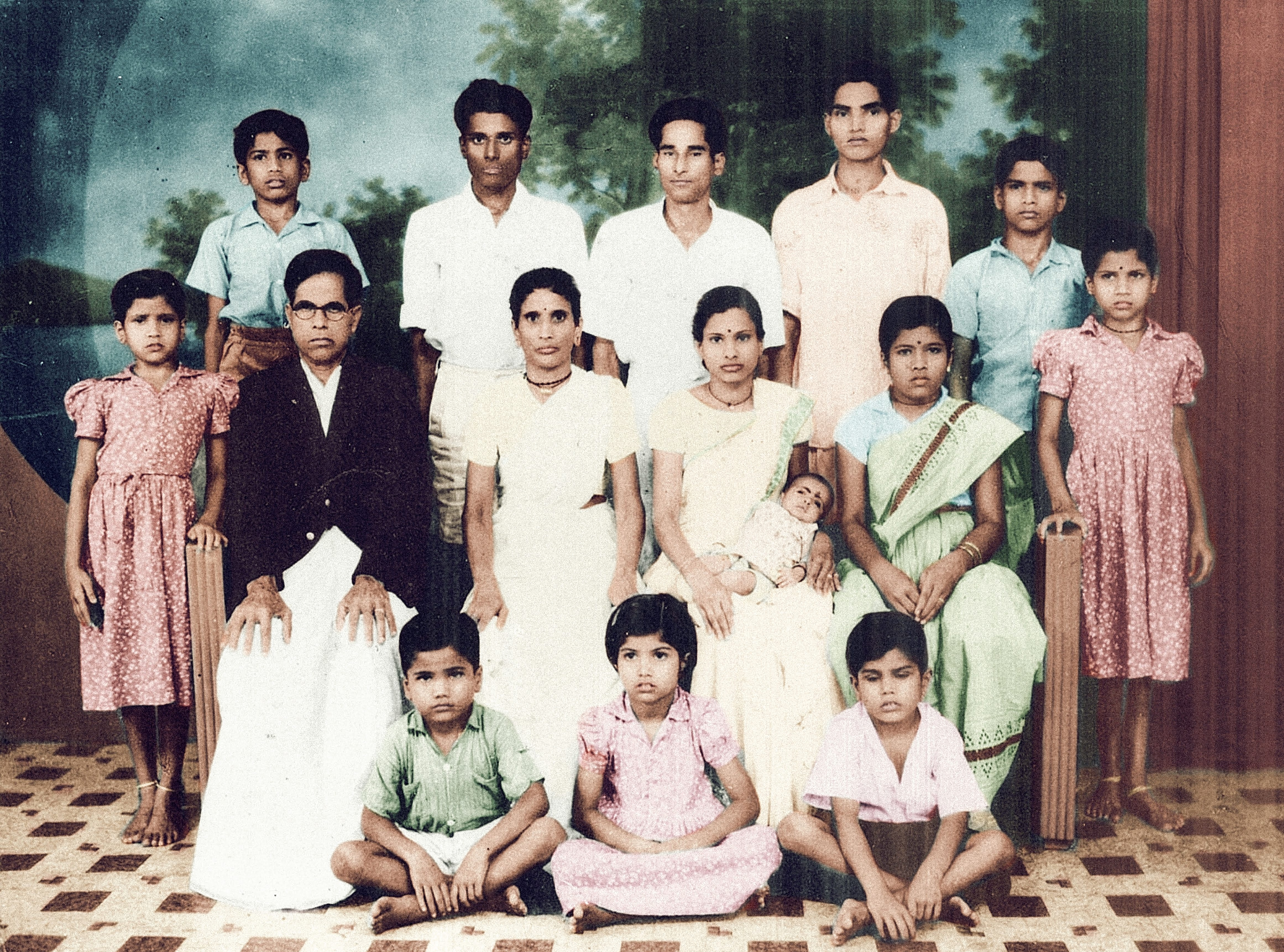
A photo of a Malayalee family of three generations, taken in 1950 in Seremban, Negeri Sembilan

Malayalees in Malaysia can be divided into three major groups based on their occupation. The majority of the Malayalees were Hindu labourers from Palakkad and Kannur, as the British Government decided to bring in labourers from the Madras Presidency. Back then, most of the towns in the Madras Presidency were well connected by roads, railways and ports, thus making it easy for labourers to travel. Before the independence of India, the Malabar region was a part of the Madras Presidency.

Around the 1930s, many Malayalee labourers migrated to Malaya to work in estates through the kangani system. Most of the labourers from Palakkad travelled on the Rajula Ship from Madras, and labourers from the Malabar coastline travelled from the Cannanore Port. The Straits Settlements, Port Swettenham and Port Dickson were the major ports where the Malayalees landed in Malaya. Estates around areas such as Padang Rengas, Sitiawan, Labu, Bahau and all over the west coast of Peninsular Malaysia had Malayalee labourers.

Most of the educated Malayalees who came to Malaya were Hindus and Christians from Cochin and Travancore. As they were educated and could understand a little Tamil, having them as clerks in the estates helped the communication barrier between the estate managers and the labourers.

Many Muslims from the Malabar region migrated to Malaya as merchants, businessmen and traders. They were known for owning restaurants, grocery shops and medicine shops. It is believed that a large number of Malabari Muslims had migrated to Penang and Malacca even before the British invaded Malaya. In British Malaya, the traders from Malabar travelled from ports in Cannanore and Calicut to Penang and Malacca.

== Language ==
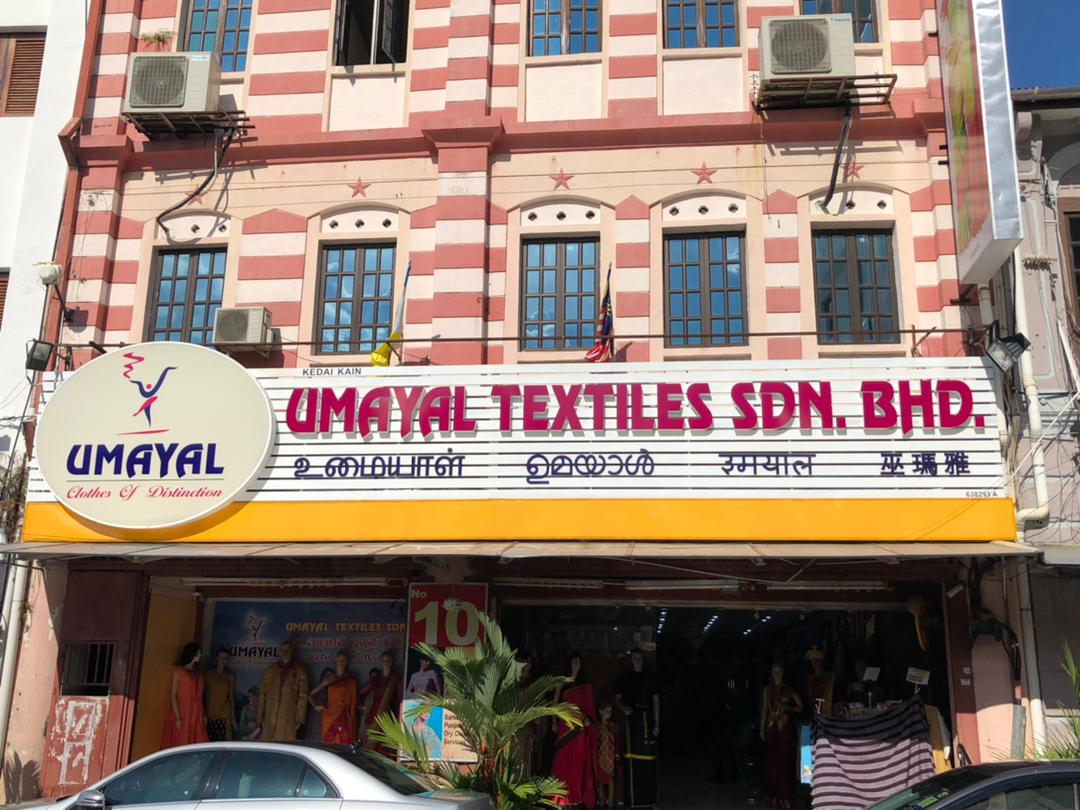
The usage of Malayalam on a billboard of a textiles outlet in Penang

=== Malayalam dialects spoken in Malaysia ===
Malayalees migrated from Travancore, Cochin and the Malabar regions to Malaya. A very small number of them were from districts such as Wayanad and Idukki. Thus, many dialects of Malayalam were spoken in Malaya initially. As many labourers were from Palakkad and Kannur, dialects from these areas were prominent among the Malayalee labourers. The Malayalam dialects spoken in Malappuram, Kozhikode, Kannur and Kasargod were spoken by the Malabari Muslims in Malaya. The Arabi Malayalam was used as a medium for religious classes among the Malabars, and the Malayali Christians in Malaya spoke dialects from Cochin. However, today those dialects are used only by a very small number of people because many of them tend to use Standard Malayalam.

=== Education ===
Malayalam medium schools were established in estates where Malayalees were the majority, around the 1920s in order to provide primary education for Malayalee children. Setting up a school for the Malayalees was one of the condition set by the Malayalee Kanganis to bring labourers into Malaya. However, the financial status of the Malayalee clerks and merchants enabled them to enrol their children to English medium schools. During World War II, these Malayalam medium schools closed due to the Japanese occupation in Malaya. The schools were later opened until the Independence of Malaya (1957).

In 1939, the Singapore Malayalee Hindu Samajam provided Malayalam classes at night for the younger generation in order to create a chance for the youths to learn Malayalam. In 1946, a Malayalam school was established in Segamat, with an enrollment of 80 students. The school was also approved by the Johor State Education Department. Estates in Padang Rengas, Labu, and Johor Bahru were known to have Malayalam medium schools in existence before the Independence of Malaya.

After the Independence of Malaya, many of these schools were shut down permanently. Some schools were converted to Tamil medium schools, to provide education for all Indians. The Malayalam medium schools converted into Tamil medium schools includes SJKT Ladang Gapis, Padang Rengas and SJKT Masai, Masai. Around the early 1970s, the Malayalee Associations in Peninsular Malaysia provided Malayalam classes to preserve the language. The classes were held for children and adults based on the Standard Malayalam. However, the syllabi for all Malayalam classes conducted in Malaysia were not streamlined. Today, Malayalam classes are still being provided by numerous Malayalee Associations throughout Peninsular Malaysia.

The Kerala Bandhu was published as a weekly newspaper in Batu Pahat, Johore around the 1920s. The newspaper was later printed in Singapore due to the high population of Malayalees there and renamed as Malaysia Malayali around the early 1970s. It was published as a daily newspaper in Singapore till December, 1988.

In 1931, the first Malayalee reading room in Malaya was founded in Jelf Road (Regat Tun Perak), Ipoh. The reading room provided newspapers, magazines, and Malayalam books for general reading. The reading room was also a place of discussion and a place to conduct Malayali cultural events.

=== Status ===
The Tamil language has been a prominent language and a lingua franca among the Indians in Malaysia. This is because the Tamils make up approximately 75% of the entire Indian population in Malaysia (the majority of the population in the Madras Presidency). The Tamil language has a firm hold in education, society and politics.

As Tamil has been known to represent the Indian community, specifically South Indian community, other Indian languages have lost the opportunity to be prominent in education, society, politics and media including Malayalam. In order to be unified, the Malayalees and Telugus had agreed to Tamil being a language to represent the Indians, though some North Indians were against it. The Punjabi language represented a part of the North Indian communities. Tamil language were applied mainly in education, being a subject available to be examined in the Malaysian Public Exams (although the population of the Punjabis is approximately 2/3rd of the population of the Malayalees in Malaysia).

Today, Malayalam is only used as a spoken language at home and for formal purpose pertaining to some events held by the Malayalee Associations. There are no local radio channels, television channels and political parties representing the Malayalees, or its language. However, Malayalam television programs are broadcast by local television channels, and Malayalam songs are played on the National Indian Radio Channel (Minnal FM).

=== Language shift ===
Many Malaysian Malayalees, especially the youths who are either the third or fourth generation are not that fluent in speaking Malayalam. This is because of a shift occurring from Malayalam to Tamil among the Malayalee youths. Most of the Malayalee Christians and Hindus who are highly educated tend to use Tamil as their first languages. Some of them use English as their mother tongue too. Many Malayalees also who belong to families of medium education background practice speaking Tamil as their first language and they enroll their children into Tamil medium schools. Malabari Muslim youths today are more comfortable in speaking Bahasa Malaysia than their mother tongue.

== Population ==
=== Population in the British Malaya ===
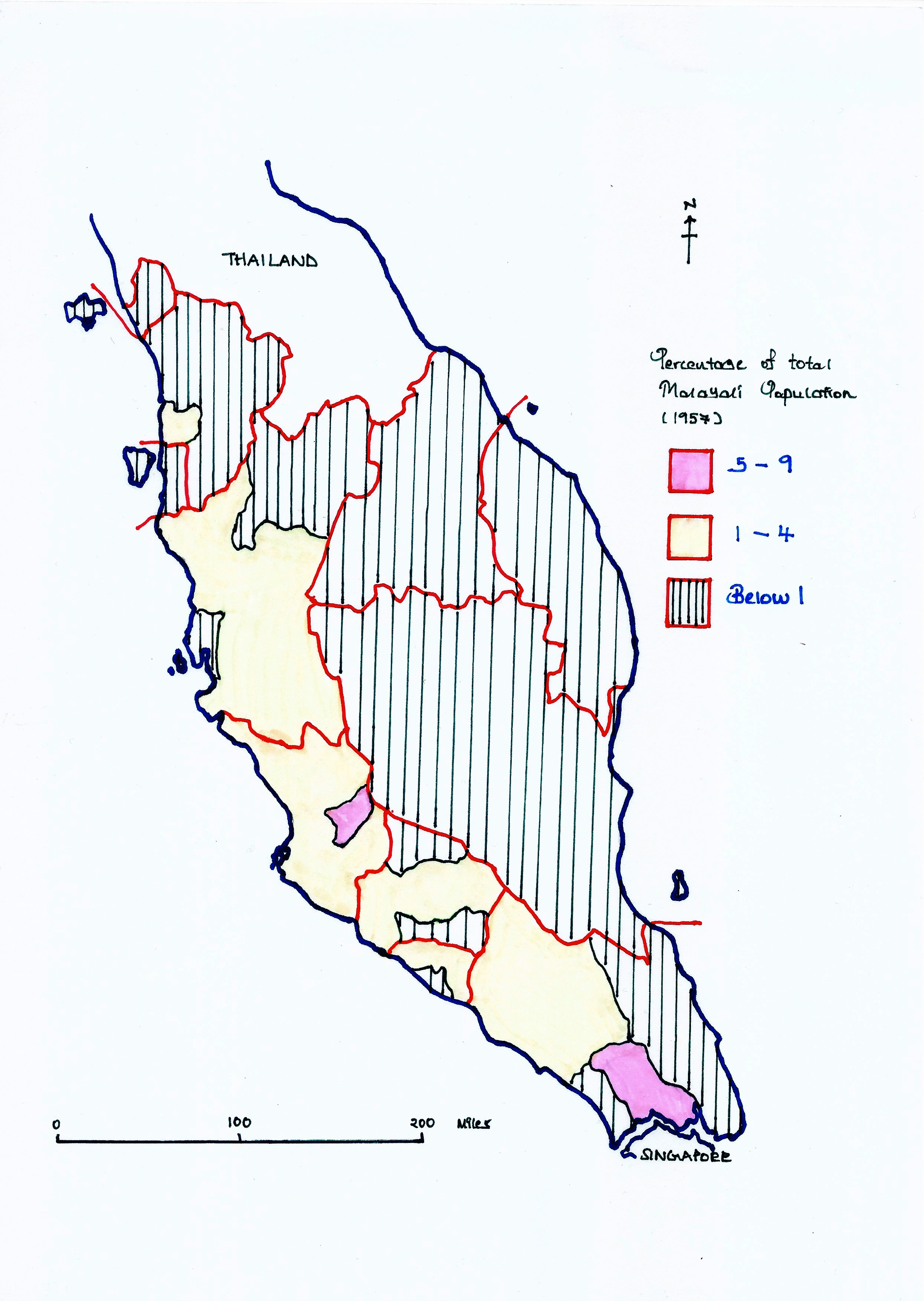
A map showing the distribution of the Malayali population in Malaya by district (excluding Singapore which contained approximately 27% of the Malayali population in Malaya (1957))

Population of Malayalees and Indians in Malaya (1921–1957)
| Year | Population of Malayalees | Population of Indians | Percentage of Malayalees among Indians (%) |
|---|---|---|---|
| 1921 | 17,190 | 470,180 | 3.66 |
| 1931 | 34,898 | 621,847 | 5.61 |
| 1947 | 44,889 | 599,616 | 7.49 |
| 1957 | 72,971 | 820,270 | 8.90 |
| 1970 | 69,345 | 940,707 | 7.37 |

The Malayalees form the second largest Indian ethnic group in Malaysia. Based on the census conducted by the British Government in 1957, the percentage of the population of Malayalees in Malaya was 0.98 to the total population of Malaya. The sex ratio of the Malayalees was lowest in 1957, with about 480 females only to every 1,000 males.

Although census were recorded for the Malayalees in Malaya, it is inaccurate because the figures only covered Malayalees who migrated on ships from the ports in the Malabar coastline. The children of the Malayalees who migrated to Malaya from the Madras Port (mostly labourers) were registered as Tamils in their birth certificate. This led to the actual population of Malayalees in Malaya being unknown, but definitely more than the figure from the census conducted by the British government.

=== Population in Malaysia ===
Population of Malayalees and Indians in Malaysia (1957–2000)
| Year | Population of Malayalees | Population of Indians | Percentage of Malayalees among Indians (%) |
|---|---|---|---|
| 1957 | 51,118 | 735,077 | 3.7 |
| 1970 | 44,199 | 933,197 | 4.7 |
| 1980 | 34,864 | 1,087,483 | 3.2 |
| 1991 | 44,266 | 1,316,190 | 3.37 |
| 2000 | 35,809 | 1,594,155 | 2.25 |

The population of the Malayalis have been recorded by the Malaysian government. However, the record has been inaccurate due to some mistakenly Malayalis addressing themselves as Tamils, and some being classified into the "Orang India Muslim/ Malabari" category.

There are also 13,392 emigrants from Kerala, which accounts 0.6% of the overall immigrants to Malaysia, according to Kerala Migration Survey Report, 2011.

=== Estimated population ===
The population of the Malayalees in Malaysia was estimated to be 228,900 in 2020. This figure is based on people who have full and partial Malayali descent. However, this figure is not accurate based on the system of the Malaysian Government because of the segregation of the Malayalee Muslims as a separate Indian ethnic category (Orang India Muslim/Malabari). Thus, this decreases the number of Malayalees in the census records of Malaysia. The estimated population of Malayalees excluding the Malabari Muslim population is approximately 189,660.

The mix marriages among the Malayalees and other Indian ethnic groups have increased the number of people with partial Malayali descent among the Malaysian Indians. Thus, the percentage of Malayalees among the Indians is estimated to increase to 10 in 2020.

Estimated population of Malayalees in Malaysia based on religions (2020)
| Religion | Population | Percentage based on total number of Malayalees in Malaysia (%) |
|---|---|---|
| Hindus | 172,407 | 75.26 |
| Islam | 39,351 | 17.19 |
| Christian | 17,142 | 7.5 |
| Others | 115 | 0.05 |

== Culture ==
=== Influence of other cultures ===
The Malayalees can be considered as the most culturally diverse ethnic group of South India in aspects of one's region, religion, caste and influence of other cultures. As the Malayalees migrated to Malaya, they received influence from the Tamil culture (the predominant Indian ethnic) and the Malays, in aspects of food, lifestyle, outfits, believes and more.

Many Malayalee men were married to Tamil women and women from other races because there were more Malayalee men than the Malayalee women. The sex ratio of the Malayalees was lowest in 1957, with about 480 females only to every 1,000 males. This led to many mix marriages taking place among the Indian ethnic groups. As there were some Malayalee men who only preferred marrying Malayalee women, many of them willingly married the Malayalee widows in Malaya. Thus, this scenario had led the Malayalees in receiving influence of other cultures.

=== Festivals and celebrations ===
The Malayalees in Malaysia do observe Malayalee festivals such as Vishu and Onam festivals. Moreover, they also observe Deepavali and Thaipusam.

As the Onam festival is observed for 10 days in Kerala, the Malaysian Malayalees only observe it for one day. They usually celebrate Onam by having a sadhya and making pookalam. The affiliates of the All Malaysia Malayalee Association, AMMA organise cultural events during August and September in conjunction with Onam. Singing, dance and pookalam competitions are known to take place during those events.

=== Media and the performing arts ===
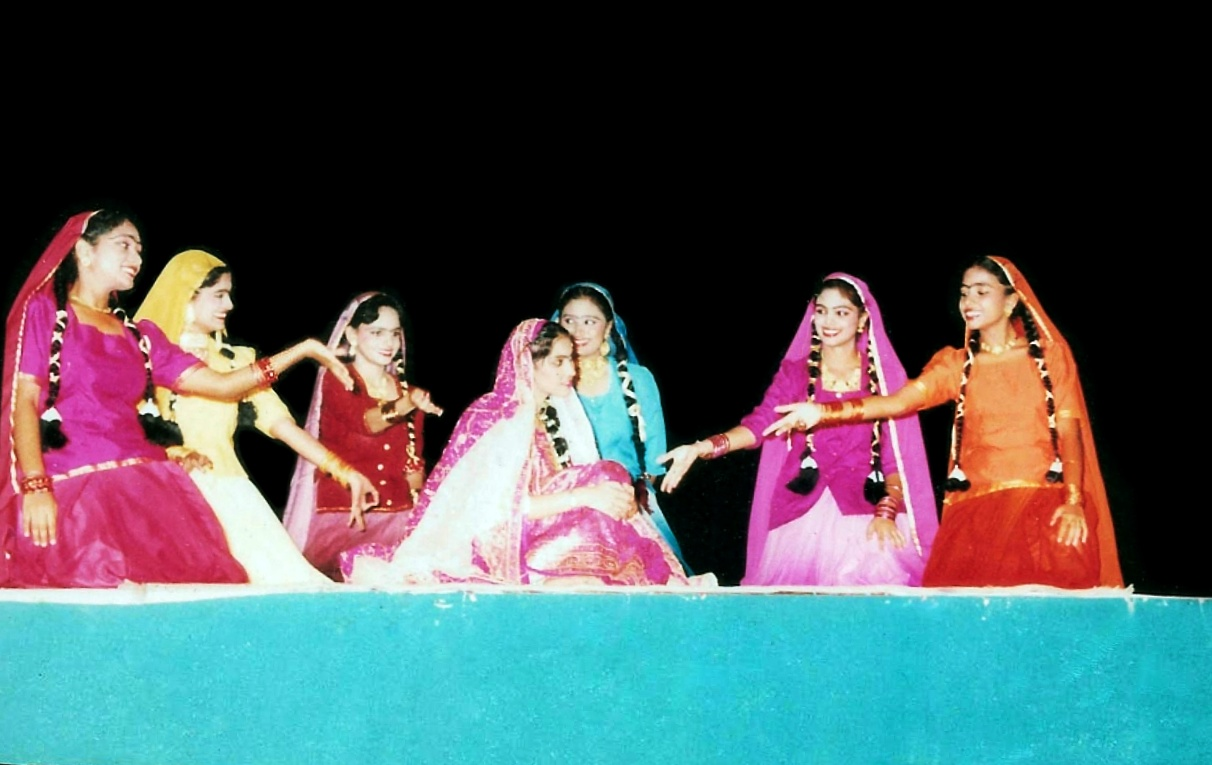
Oppana dance performed by the Selangor & Federal Territory Malayalee Association's youths in 2000

The Kairali Arts Club (KAC) was formed in 1956 as a Malayalam theatrical club in Malaya. The KAC members have performed over 50 full length stage dramas. Today, KAC is known to be one of the oldest living theatre club in Malaysia.

Around the 1970s, the Malayalee associations all over Peninsular Malaysia, especially the Selangor & Federal Territory Malayalee Association (SFTMA), had actively held shows in conjunction with Vishu and Onam, which consists various performance of the Malayalee culture. The Mohiniyattam, Thiruvathirakali, stage plays, and the Mappila Paattu were often performed by the Malayalee youths.

During the 1980s, Radio Television Malaysia had produced TV shows in conjunction with Deepavali. As Datuk Susheela Menon was one of the most popular Indian artist in that era, the TV shows included Malayalam songs too. Minnal FM, previously known as Radio 6, begin playing Malayalam songs since the 1970s.

In 2020, the inaugural Malaysian Malayalam telemovie Acchammakku Oru Vishukkani premiered on Astro Vaanavil to coincide with the festival of Vishu. It featured renowned Malaysian Indian artists, including Datin Sri Shaila Nair, Aanantha THR, Krithigah Nair, Shabby, and others in its cast. In 2023, the second Malaysian Malayalam telemovie, Nigoodam, was broadcast on Astro Vaanavil in conjunction with Vishu.

== Religion ==
Religion of Malaysian Malayalees (2020)
1. Hinduism (75.3%)
2. Islam (17.2%)
3. Christianity (7.50%)
4. Others (0.05%)

=== Hinduism ===
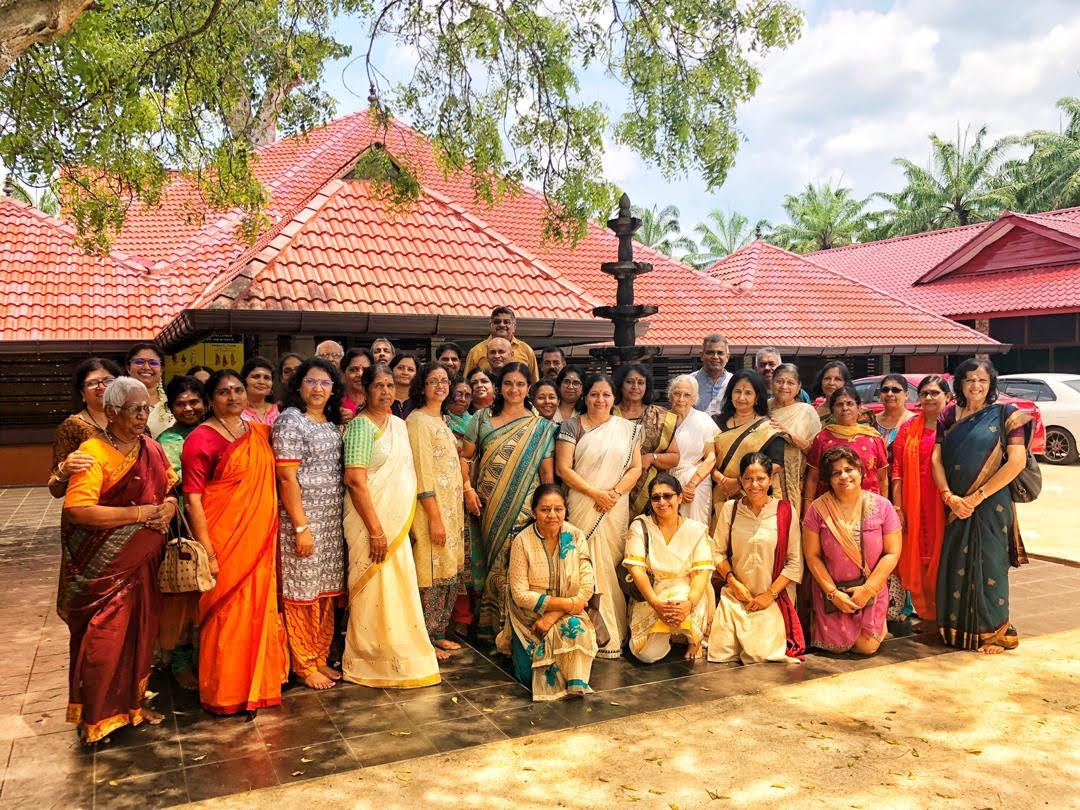
A group of Malayalee Hindu devotees in the Sri Mangala Chamundi Temple in Bahau, Negeri Sembilan

It is estimated that over 75% of all Malayalees in Malaysia are Hindus. They are generally followers of Shaivism and Vaishnavism.

A large number of Malayalees who migrated from North Malabar (Kannur & Kasargod) prayed to Muthappan. One of the earliest Muthappan Temple built in Malaya was the Kampung Abbey Muthappan Temple, Nyalas, Malacca, built in 1911. Today there are five Muthappan deities in Negeri Sembilan, 4=four in Johor, three in Malacca, and one each in Perak as well as Penang. The Sri Mangala Chamundi Temple in Bahau, Negeri Sembilan is built according to the architectural style of Kerala temples.

Over time, certain beliefs, rituals and practices of the Tamil Hindus were adopted. For instance, the Malayalee Hindu labourers who predominantly prayed only to the oil lamp (Nilavilakku) at home, begin praying using pictures of the gods and goddesses. Malayalees have embraced practices such as praying to Lord Murugan and observing Thaipusam – Lord Murugan is known as a primary deity in temples wherever communities of the Tamil people live worldwide.

=== Islam ===
Penang and Johor Bahru are the prominent places of the Kerala Muslim community in Malaysia. People migrated across Kerala to Malaysia and formed relationships with the locals.

As Islam was a unifying factor among the Malayalis and the Malays in Penang, large number of mix marriages took place within the Muslim community in Penang – resulting in the influence of Malay culture in their religious activities.

The Kerala Muslim community in Johor are mostly from estates in Ulu Tiram and Masai. At night, religious classes were held for the children in estate. The religious classroom was known as Othu Muri and classes were conducted by a labourer who had vast knowledge about Islam. That particular labourer is addressed as mollaka. The Arabi Malayalam was used as a medium for the classes. Later in 1971, the first madrasah was built by the Jemaah Muslim Negeri Johor. The ustaz for these new madrasahs are recognized religious teachers, specially brought from Kerala. Madrasah Darul Salam in Ulu Tiram is one of the madrasahs set up by the Muslims.

=== Christianity ===
The sizeable number of Malayalee Christians in Malaysia are mostly Syrian Christians and Roman Catholics. Based on research in 1984, there were roughly 10,000 Roman Catholic Malayalees and 5,000 Syrian Christians in Malaysia which constituted 15% of the total Indian Christians in Malaysia. Today there are roughly ten churches in Malaysia, associated with the Malayalees in Malaysia. The Malayalam language is used in masses and also caroling.

=== Others ===
There are a few Malayalees in Malaysia who follow Buddhism, Jainism and the Baháʼí Faith. Some Malaysian Malayalees who are married to Sikhs tend to adapt the culture and perform rituals of the Sikhs.

== Community ==
=== Earliest Malayalee associations ===
The Kerala Mahajana Sangam was established in Singapore in 1917 to cater the needs of the Malayalees in Singapore. It is known to be the first Malayalee organisation established outside of India. It was later renamed as Singapore Malayalee Association.

In 1926, the Singapore Malayalee Hindu Samajam was formed. The association was responsible for not only providing funeral services for Malayalee Hindus in Singapore, but also for the ones in Johore and Malacca.

However, the earliest Malayalee association based in Peninsula Malaysia was the Malaya Malayalee Association, based in Trolak, Perak. The association was formed in 1922. A hall was rented as an office and a venue to conduct activities. Malayalees, both members and non-members, were eligible to utilise the facilities provided by the association. In 1923, the Malaya Malayalee Association started a campaign to provide jobs for unemployed Malayalees who were in search of positions such as clerks, conductors and dressers.

In the 1950s, many Malayalee associations were formed all over Peninsula Malaysia. The North Malaysia Malayali Samajam (NMMS) was formed in 1951, followed by the Selangor & Federal Territory Malayalee Association (SFTMA) and Negeri Sembilan Kerala Samajam (NSKS). By 1970, there were seven Malayalee associations established in Peninsular Malaysia.

=== All Malaysia Malayalee Association ===
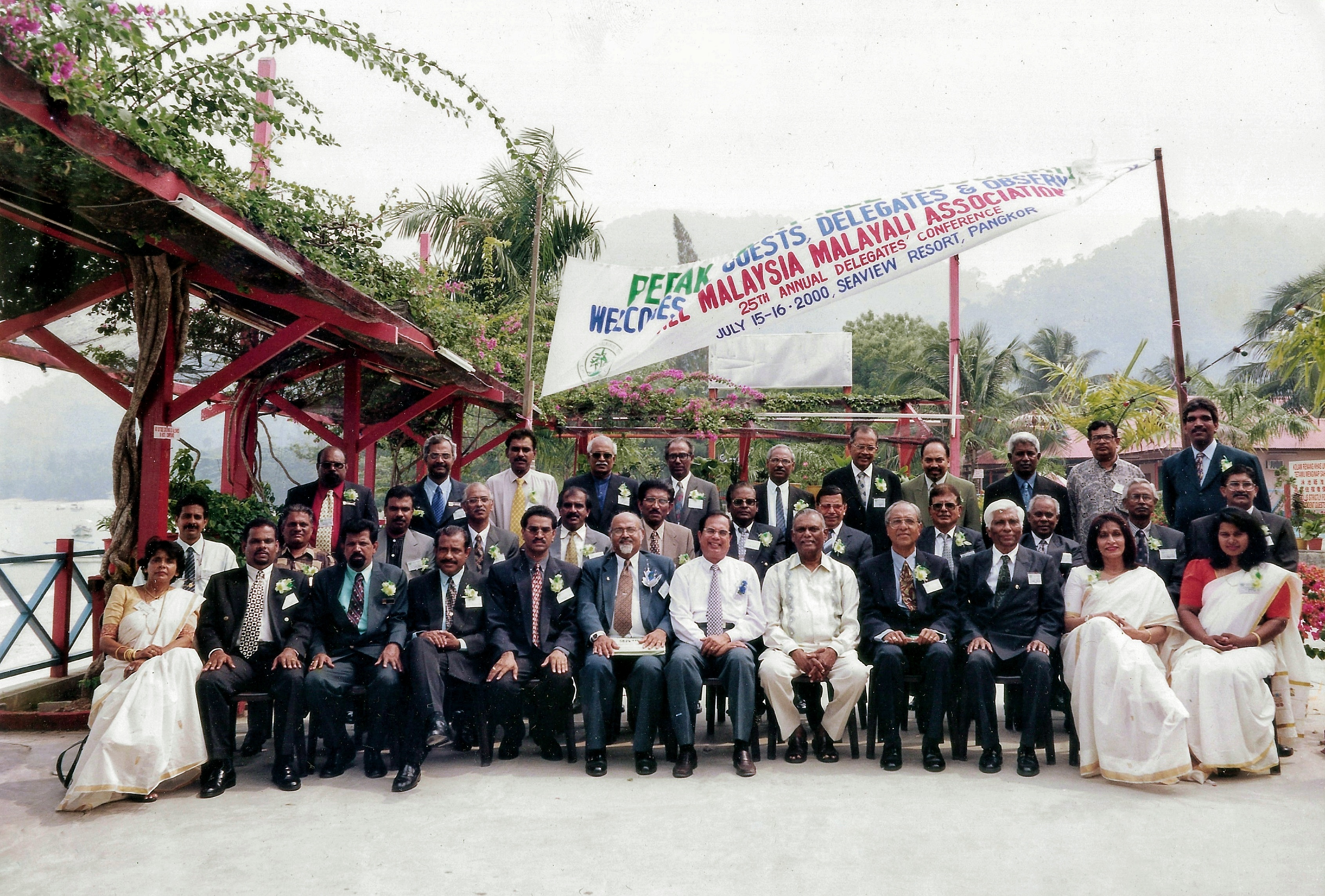
Committee members of All Malaysia Malayalee Association (2000)

In 1975, All Malaysia Malayalee Association was formed as an umbrella body for various Malayalee associations throughout Malaysia, as all Malayalee associations were set up based on different objectives and purpose.

The organisation does not have individual membership, but has a membership of 22 affiliate Malayali organisations across Malaysia, including itself.

=== Other associations ===
There are a few independent Malayalee associations in Malaysia (not an affiliate of AMMA). In addition, the Pravasi Malayalee Association and the Malayalee Kudumbam Association (both situated in Kuala Lumpur) were formed by the Malayalee expatriates in Malaysia.

== Notable people ==
The list of notable people here are full or partial Malayali descent. It includes Malayalees who are born in Malaysia.

=== Arts and entertainment ===
- Malaysia Vasudevan
- Jalaja
- Reshmonu
- Chacko Vadaketh

=== Public service and labour rights ===
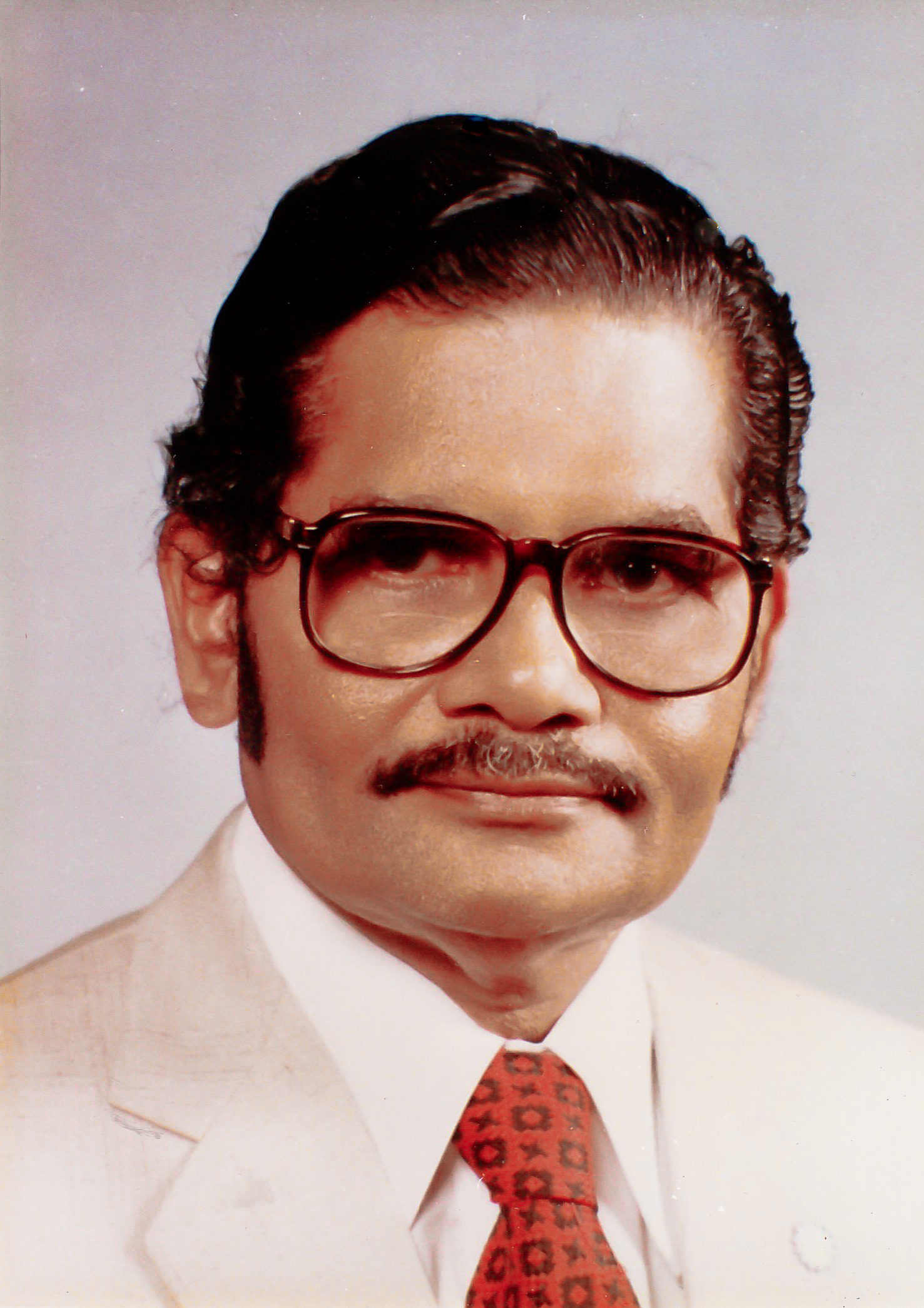
P. P. Narayanan received the Ramon Magsaysay Award Public Service in 1962, and was the second recipient from Malaysia. The Malaysian government honoured him, after a major road in Petaling Jaya, named Jalan P.P. Narayanan.

- P P Narayanan

=== Legal authority ===
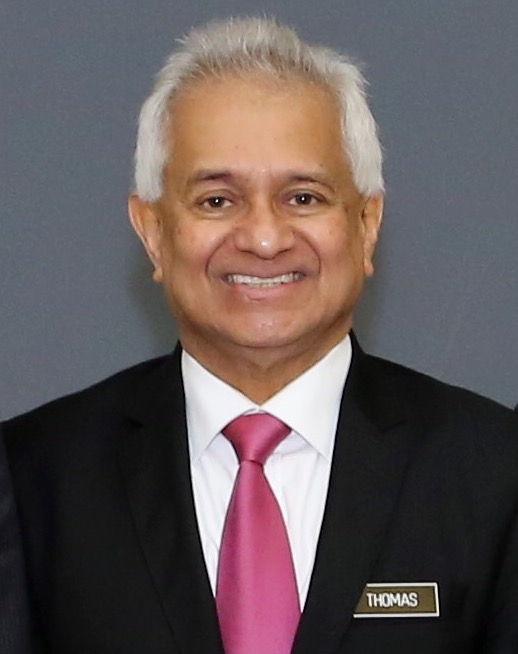
Tommy Thomas, the 8th Attorney General of Malaysia

- Gengadharan Nair
- Tommy Thomas

=== Business people and entrepreneurs ===
- Tony Fernandes

=== Politicians ===
- Devan Nair
- N.K. Menon
- Latheefa Koya

=== Journalists ===
- M. G. G. Pillai
- Martin Vengadesan

=== Literary figures ===
- Uthaya Sankar SB
- John Davies

=== Musicians ===
- Ash Nair
- Harikrish Menon
- Prashanthini
- Yugendran

=== Sportspeople ===
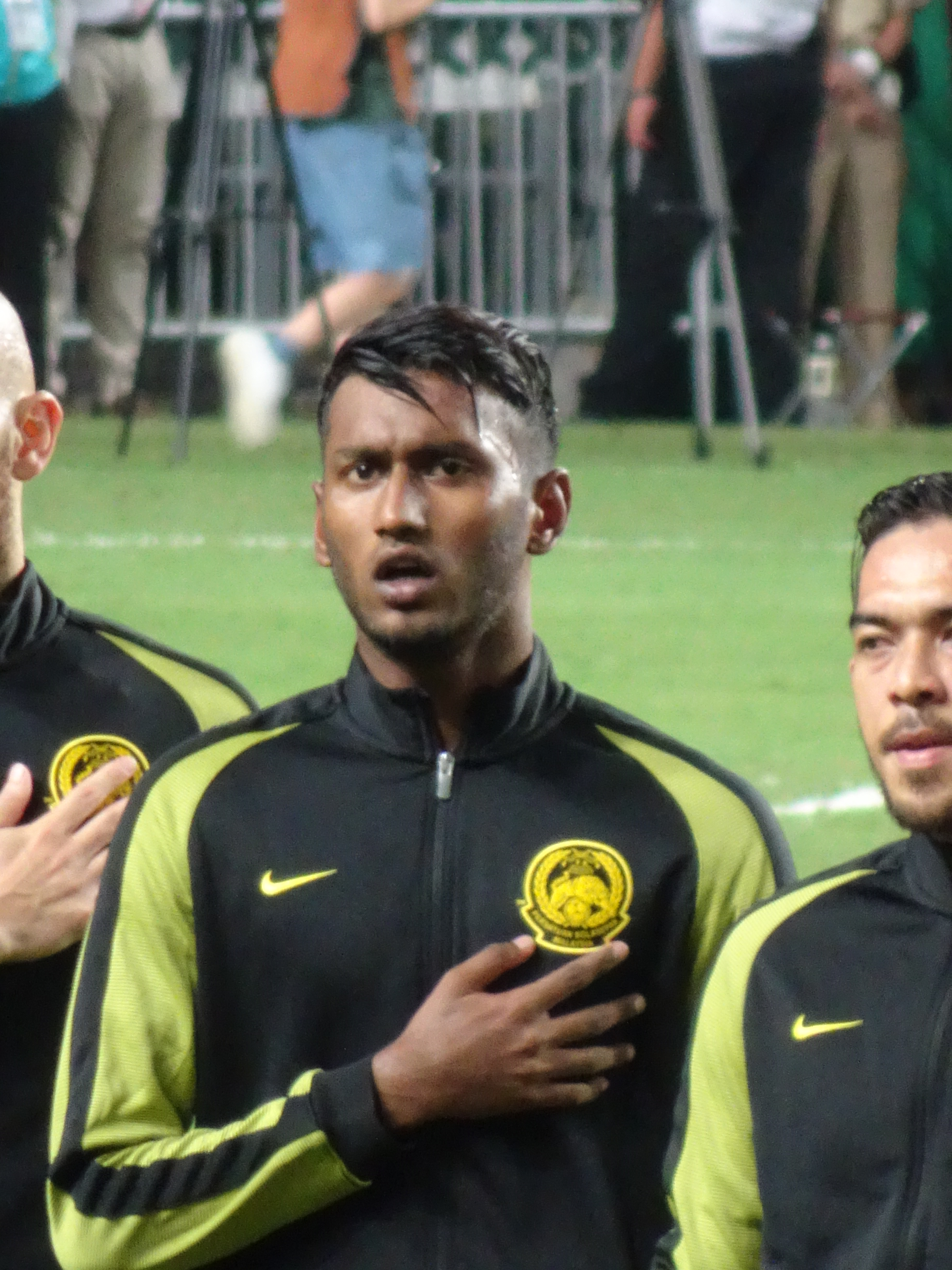
Syamer Kutty Abba, a Malaysian professional football player who plays as a midfielder for the Johor Darul Ta'zim F.C. and the Malaysia national football team

- Jeevandran Nair
- Kunjiraman Ramadas
- Ramesh Menon
- Syamer Kutty Abba

== See also ==
- All Malaysia Malayalee Association
- Malayali
- Malaysian Indians
- Tamil Malaysians
- Telugu Malaysians
- Dravidians
- Malayali Australians
- Kerala Gulf diaspora
