= Garshom Awards =

- Civilian Award
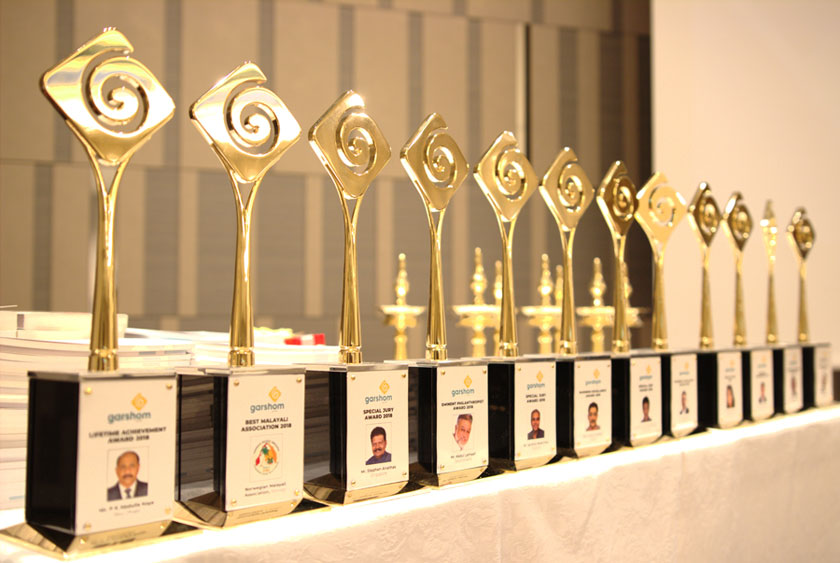
- First award: 2003 Bangalore, India

Highlights
- Total awarded: 118
- First winner: Dr. Poly Mathew from Germany
- Next award: 3 December 2026, Manila, Philippines

Garshom Awards, the most prestigious awards for Non Resident Keralites and was initiated in the year 2002. The word "Garshom" means, one who is away from his motherland. Garshom Awards were instituted to recognize those hidden faces among the community of Non Resident Keralites who have been doing laudable work in the socio-cultural-business-professional field in various parts of the world. The awards recognize the contribution of the global community of NRKs to the society they are currently part of, the nation they were born to, and to Kerala, their motherland in particular.

20 Garshom Award presentation ceremonies have been held in Bangalore 2003, 2004, 2010, New Delhi 2005, Trivandrum 2006, Hyderabad 2007, Chennai 2009, Kuwait 2011, Kuala Lumpur, Malaysia 2012, Bangalore 2015, Malacca, Malaysia 2016, Atlantis, The Palm, Dubai 2017, Tokyo, Japan 2018, Oslo Norway 2019, Panaji Goa, Baku Azerbaijan 2022, Bahrain 2023, Yerevan, Armenia 2024. and Singapore 2025.

== 20th Garshom Awards ==
Awardee	Award	Country
Sajeev Narayanan	Garshom Pravasi Ratna Award	Kuwait
Alex K Abraham	Garshom Business Excellence Award	Philippines
Suchetha Satish	Garshom Young Talent Award	United Arab Emirates
Mumshad Mannambeth	Garshom Visionary Innovator Award	Singapore
Savio James	Garshom Young Entrepreneur Award	Ireland
D Sudheeran	Garshom Cultural Icon Award	Singapore
All Moscow Malayalee Association - AMMA	Garshom Best Malayalee Association Award	Russia

The 20th Garshom International Awards were presented at the Orchid Country Club, Singapore. The awards were presented by Terry Alan Farris (USA) and Rudy Fang (Singapore). The inaugural address was delivered by Ajith Kolassery, CEO of NORKA, Government of Kerala.

The event was accompanied by the ASEAN+ Business Dialogue, with delegates from 23 countries taking part.

The ceremony was held in the presence of Jaijo Joseph (Syndicate Member, Goa University, Co-founder Garshom Foundation), Ivan Nigli (former MLA, Government of Karnataka), Jins Paul (Founder Garshom), Joseph Scaria Junior (Director, Garshom 2.0).

== 19th Garshom Awards ==
Awardee	Award	Country
Santhosh Kumaar Ketteth	Garshom Pravasi Ratna Award	United Arab Emirates
Raveendra Nath	Garshom Humanitarian Award	India
Shyny Frank	Garshom Pravasi Vanitha Award	Kuwait
Danesh Narayanan	Garshom Business Excellence Award	Armenia
Malayalee Association of the UK (MAUK)	Garshom Best Malayalee Association Award	United Kingdom

The 19th Garshom International Awards presentation ceremony was held on 16 November 2024, in Best Western Plus Congress Hotel Yerevan, Armenia. The chief guests included Mr. Sagar Khandre, Member of Parliament- India. Mr. Hayk Margarian, Director of the United Nations Climate Technology Center and Mr. Aditya Pandey, Secretary of the Indian Embassy in Armenia

== 18th Garshom Awards ==
Awardee	Award	Country
Thomas Mottackal	Garshom Lifetime Achievement Award	United States
Mohammed M	Garshom Pravasi Ratna Award	Bahrain
Sebastian Thomas	Garshom Business Excellence Award	India
Harikrishnan Madiyan	Garshom Innovative Visionary Award	Guinea
Dr. Thahira Kallumurikkal	Garshom Pravasi Vanitha Award	United Arab Emirates
SANTHWANAM Kuwait	Garshom Best Non Profit Organization Award	Kuwait

The 18th Garshom International Awards were presented at Crowne Plaza Bahrain on 2 December 2023 by Bahrain Tourism Director Mr Senan Aljabre and Public Information Director Mr Youssef Lowry.

== 17th Garshom Awards ==
Awardee	Award	Country
K G Manmadhan Nair	Garshom Lifetime Achievement Award	United States
Moosa Koya	Garshom Pravasi Ratna Award	Saudi Arabia
Jacob Mathew	Garshom Spirit of Humanity Award	Azerbaijan
Tentacle Aerologistix Pvt Ltd	Garshom Promising Enterprise Award	India
SAMA France	Garshom Best Malayali Association Award	France

Garshom International Awards 2022 were presented at The Landmark Hotel, Baku Azerbaijan on 22 November 2022. Indian Embassy in Baku Ambassador-in-Charge Mr Vinay Kumar given away the 17th Garshom International Awards. Azerbaijan Parliament Member Razi Nurullayev, Croatia Ambassador Mr Branko Zebic, Bengaluru North University Syndicate Member Mr Jaijo Joseph and former Karnataka MLA Mr Ivan Nigli are special guests.

== 16th Garshom Awards ==
Awardee	Award	Country
Dr. Satish Krishnan	Garshom Lifetime Achievement Award	United Arab Emirates
Saji Markose	Garshom Pravasi Ratna Award	Bahrain
Dr. Susan Joseph	Garshom Pravasi Vanitha Award	India
Aebgin John Poickattil	Garshom Innovative Leader Award	Norway

Garshom International Awards 2021 presentation ceremony was held at Hyatt Regency Baku, Azerbaijan on 20 November 2022. Morocco Ambassador Mr Mohammad Adil Embarch given away the awards. Indian Embassy in Baku Ambassador-in-Charge Mr Vinay Kumar, Bengaluru North University Syndicate Member Mr Jaijo Joseph and former Karnataka MLA Mr Ivan Nigli are participated as special guests.

== 15th Garshom Awards ==
Awardee	Award	Country
Santhan Nanu	Garshom Lifetime Achievement Award	India
V J Mathew - Benny Vazhappillil	Garshom Pravasi Ratna Award	Indonesia
Mohan Balakrishnan Nair	Garshom Business Excellence Award	India
Binoy Sebastian	Garshom Spirit of Humanity Award	Kuwait
Supriya Cherian	Garshom Yuva Pravasi Award	Australia
El Shaddai Charitable Trust	Garshom Best Organization Award	India
Dhaka Malayalee Association - DMA	Garshom Best Malayali association Award	Bangladesh

The Hon'ble Governor of Goa Mr. P S Sreedharan Pillai presented the 15th Garshom International Awards at Fortune Miramar ITC Hotel, Panaji in Goa on 17 September 2022, in the presence of Mr. Mauvin Godinho, Minister for Industries, Transport, Panchayat and Protocol, Govt. of Goa, Mr. Krishna V Salkar MLA, chairman, South Goa Planning and Development Authority, Mr. Jaijo Joseph, Syndicate Member, Bangalore North University and Mr. Jins Paul, President, Garshom Foundation.

== 14th Garshom Awards ==
Awardee	Award	Country
V A Hassan	Garshom Lifetime Achievement Award	United Arab Emirates
Babu Varghese	Garshom Pravasi Ratna Award	United States
Dr. Laly Samuel	Garshom Pravasi Vanitha Award	New Zealand
Biju P Varghese	Garshom Business Excellence Award	India
Tiby Kuruvila	Garshom Emerging Businessman Award	Japan
Swaroop Rajan Mayilvahanam	Garshom Young Businessman Award	Kuwait
Dr. Ramkumar B Nair	Garshom Young Talent Award	Sweden
Ente Keralam	Garshom Best Malayali Association	Australia

The Garshom International Awards 2019 were presented in a function held at Hotel Scandic Solli, Oslo in Norway on 24 August 2019. Norway Notodden Municipality Mayor Gry Fuglestveit Bløchlinger and Norway Parliament member Mr. Himanshu Gulati distributed the awards to the winners in the presence of Mr. Amar Jeet, director of cultural wing with the Indian Embassy in Norway, the award committee chairman and Karnataka ex-MLA Mr. Ivan Nigli, former Garshom awardee Mr. P K Abdulla Koya, Dr. Bindu Sara Varghese, President, Norwegian Malayali Association, Mr. Jostein Meen, Mr. Jaijo Joseph, executive director, Garshom Infomedia Limited and Mr. Jins Paul, President, Garshom Foundation.

== 13th Garshom Awards ==
Awardee	Award	Country
P K Abdulla Koya	Garshom Lifetime Achievement Award	UAE
Joe Matthews	Garshom Pravasi Ratna Award	United States
Prof. D Sakthi Kumar Ph.D	Garshom Academic Excellence Award	Japan
Dr. Sony Sebastian	Garshom Emerging Businessman Award	Kuwait
Sunish Parakkel	Garshom Business Excellence Award	Japan
Anil Raj Manghat	Garshom Business Excellence Award	Japan
Shilpa Raj	Garshom Young Talent Award	USA
Abdul Latheef	Garshom Philanthropy Award	Saudi Arabia
Stephan Anathas	Garshom Special Jury Award	Singapore
Ignatius Muscrinas Sabastian	Garshom Special Jury Award	Malaysia
Paul T Puthenpurekal	Garshom Special Jury Award	Philippines
NANMA	Garshom Best Malayali Association	Norway

The 13th Garshom International Awards presentation ceremony was held at Tokyo Bay Tokyu Hotel, Tokyo, Japan on 13 October 2018. The awards were presented by Nakamura Rikako, Member of Parliament, Japan in the presence of Tom Joseph, Councillor, Whittlesea, Australia; Shigeki Someya, former MLA, Sakae-cho, Japan; Siddharth Singh, Director, Cultural Centre, Indian Embassy, Tokyo; Tadashi Awazu, President, Taiyotomah Co. Ltd., Osaka, Japan; Tetsuyuki Toyama, founder of Yamahachi Chemical Co. Ltd., Aichi, Japan; Jolly Thadathil, Germany; Suresh Lal, founding member, Nihonkairali, Japan; and Joseph Scaria, Asia Pacific Director, Habitat for Humanity International.

== 12th Garshom Awards ==
Awardee	Award	Country
Dr. P A Ibrahim	Garshom Lifetime Achievement Award	UAE
Prasanth Manghat	Garshom Business Excellence Award	UAE
Promoth Manghat	Garshom Business Excellence Award	UAE
A P Abdul Majeed	Garshom Young Businessman Award	Saudi Arabia
Tino Thomas	Garshom Yuva Pravasi Award	India
N K Kurian	Garshom Pravasi Returnee Award	India
Ananya Vinay	Garshom Young Talent Award	United States
Janet Mathews	Garshom Young Talent Award	Switzerland
Anilkumar Vasu	Garshom Special Jury Award	UAE
NIHONKAIRALI	Garshom Best Malayalee Association	Japan
Garden City University	Garshom Best Institution Award	India

The 12th Garshom International Awards presentation ceremony was held at Atlantis The Palm, Dubai, UAE on 1 December 2017. The awards were presented by Brigadier H. E Mohammed Ahmed Al Yammahi, Federal National Council Member, UAE; Sri. V Vaithilingam, Hon'ble Speaker, Puducheri Legislative Assembly; and Sri. U T Khader, Minister for Food & Civil Supplies, Govt. of Karnataka. Guests of honour were Sri. Thumbay Moideen, Chairman of Thumbay Group, UAE; Sri. Joseph Scaria, Asia Pacific Director, Habitat for Humanity International; Dr. Francis Cleetus and Sri. Ivan Nigli, former MLA, Karnataka.

== 11th Garshom Awards ==
Awardee	Award	Country
Dr. Francis Cleetus	Garshom Pravasi Ratna Award	UAE
Mani Menon	Garshom Pravasi Vanitha Award	Malaysia
Dr. Rajesh Kumar N V	Garshom Yuva Pravasi Award	United States
Manoj Mavelikkara	Garshom Special Jury Award	Kuwait
Shijo K. Francis	Garshom Special Jury Award	India
Malayalee Association for Arts & Culture	Garshom Best Malayalee Association	Hong Kong

The 11th Garshom international awards were presented at Cultural Center (Panggung Seri), Taman Budaya, Malacca, Malaysia on 17 December 2016. The Hon'ble Deputy Chief Minister, Govt. of Malacca, Malaysia, Md. Yunos Husin inaugurated the presentation ceremony. The Hon'ble Minister for Human Resource Development, Govt. of Malacca, Malaysia, Datuk M. S. Mahadevan presented the awards. All Malaysia Malayalee Association president Datuk Suseela Menon, Program Organizing Committee Chairman Dr. N R Nambiar, Tan Sri Raveendran Menon, Garshom Awards 2016 Jury chairman Sri. Joseph Scaria Junior, Garshom Foundation Secretary Sri. Jins Paul, Garshom Infomedia Ltd. Executive Director Sri. Jaijo Joseph and Malacca Kerala Samajam president Dr. Jayasankar felicitated the awardees.

== 10th Garshom Awards ==
Awardee	Award	Country
Joseph Scaria Jr.	Garshom Pravasi Ratna Award	Philippines
Jeny Verma	Garshom Pravasi Vanitha Award	India
Musthafa Hamza	Garshom Yuva Pravasi Award	Kuwait
Sqn Ldr (retd.) P. P. Cherian	Garshom Pravasi Returnee Award	India
Mathai Jacob	Garshom Special Jury Award	Nigeria
Dr. Raghavan Nambiar	Garshom Special Jury Award	Malaysia
All India Malayalee Association	Garshom Best Malayalee Association	India

The tenth Garshom Awards were presented by the Bangalore Development and Town Planning Minister Sri. K. J. George. At the presentation ceremony held in the Garden City College Ceremony Hall on Sunday 27 December 2015, the press secretary to the Indian President Sri. Venu Rajamony, Dr. Aswath Narayan MLA, Honorary Consul of Maldives Dr. Joseph V.G, and Dr. J. Alexander were the chief guests. The award for the Garshom Best Malayalee Association was given to All India Malayalee Association (AIMA), Chennai, and was received by its President Sri. Gokulam Gopalan and Chairman Sri. Babu Panikker. Former MLA Sri. Ivan Nigli, Managing Editor of Garshom Sri. Jins Paul and executive director of Garshom Sri. Jaijo Joseph also addressed the gathering.

== 9th Garshom Awards ==
Awardee	Award	Country
Dr. George Kakkanatt	Garshom Pravasi Ratna Award	United States
Dr. Johnson C Lukose	Garshom Pravasi Returnee Award	India
Antochen Thomas	Garshom Yuva Pravasi Award	India
Valsala Rajaram	Garshom Pravasi Vanitha Award	Malaysia
Satheesh Gopalan	Garshom Special Jury Award	Malaysia
Confederation of Tamil Nadu Malayalee Association	Garshom Best Malayalee Association	India

The Hon. Minister of Prime Minister's Department, Govt. of Malaysia Datuk Seri G.Palanivel presented the 9th Garshom Awards at the Batu Caves Community Hall, Kuala Lumpur, Malaysia on 21 October 2012. The Hon. Deputy Minister of Information, Communication & Culture, Govt. of Malaysia Datuk Maglin Dennis D'Cruz; Tan Sri. Datuk K.Ravindran Menon, President AMMA Malaysia; Ajay Tharayil, KPCC General Secretary; Garshom Infomedia Ltd. Managing Editor Jins Paul; Executive Director Jaijo Joseph; Datuk S. Nadarajah; Datuk A.Vaithilingam; Saras Nair; and Dr. N.R. Nambiar felicitated the awardees.

== 8th Garshom Awards ==
Awardee	Award	Country
Sageer Thrikkarippur	Garshom Pravasi Ratna Award	Kuwait
Dr. Sunitha Krishnan	Garshom Pravasi Vanitha Award	India
T A Ramesh	Garshom Special Jury Award	Kuwait
V C Praveen	Garshom Yuva Pravasi Award	India
S Ahemed	Garshom Pravasi Returnee Award	India
All Malaysia Malayalee Association	Garshom Best Malayalee Association	Malaysia

The 8th Garshom awards were presented by the former Rajyasabha deputy chairperson Dr. Najma Heptulla. At the presentation ceremony held in the Indian Community school, Salmiya, Kuwait on Friday 27 May 2011, the acting Indian Ambassador Vidhu P Nair, Gen. Secy of Samajwadi Party Rajeev Rai were the chief guests. The chairman of the jury of the 8th Garshom awards Sri. Ivan Nigli, Managing Editor of Garshom Sri. Jins Paul, Sri. Jolly Joseph also addressed the gathering.

== 7th Garshom Awards ==
Awardee	Award	Country
Dr. P.K.S Madhavan	Garshom Pravasi Ratna Award	India
Tonio Thomas	Garshom Yuva Pravasi Award	Australia
Meena Das Narayan	Garshom Pravasi Vanitha Award	United Arab Emirates
Jacob Channapetta	Garshom Special Jury Award	Kuwait
Joseph Thomas	Garshom Pravasi Returnee Award	India
KELI	Garshom Best Malayalee Association	Switzerland

The Hon. Home Minister, Govt. of Karnataka, Dr. V. S. Acharya inaugurated the 7th Garshom Awards programme at the NIMHANS Convention Centre, Bangalore on 20 February 2010. The Hon. Minister for Law & Justice, Govt. of India, Veerappa Moily presented the awards. Oommen Chandi, Opposition Leader, Govt. of Kerala; NA Haris MLA, Jayakar Reddy MLA; Sambaki MLA from Karnataka Benny Behnan; Garshom Awards Jury chairman Sri. Ivan Nigli; Garshom Infomedia Ltd. Managing Editor Sri. Jins Paul; Executive Director Sri. Jaijo Joseph; and 2008 Garshom Yuva Pravasi award winner Reji Kumar felicitated the awardees.

== 6th Garshom Awards ==
Awardee	Award	Country
Sam Kuruvilla	Garshom Pravasi Ratna Award	Qatar
Rejikumar	Garshom Yuva Pravasi Award	India
Vimalah Nair	Garshom Pravasi Vanitha Award	Malaysia
Lekha Sreenivasan	Garshom Special Jury Award	India
Biji Eapen	Garshom Pravasi Returnee Award	India
Friends Of Kerala	Garshom Best Malayalee Association	India

The awards were presented by Dr. MM Rajendran, former Governor of Orissa on 31 January 2009 at Hotel Courtyard by Marriott, Chennai. Dr. Oscar Nigli MLA; M S Viswanathan, music director; Dr. TP Sreenivasan, former Ambassador to Austria; Dr. Parateep Philip IPS, IG of Police, Chennai; and Dr. Saji D'Zousa were present . The award committee consisting of K. Sukumaran (Retd. Chief General Manager, S.B.T.), Ivan Nigli (ex. Karnataka MLA), Dr. B. Ashok Kumar, Polly Mathew Somatheeram, S.K. Nair (Administrator, Garden City College, Bangalore), and Jins Paul (Managing Editor, Garshom Infomedia Ltd) selected the winners.

== 5th Garshom Awards ==
Awardee	Award	Country
K V Shamsudeen	Garshom Pravasi Ratna Award	United Arab Emirates
Dr. Saji D’zousa	Garshom Yuva Pravasi Award	India
Susan Abraham	Garshom Pravasi Vanitha Award	Singapore
D. Machingal	Garshom Pravasi Returnee Award	India
Kerala Samajam Colourgn	Garshom Best Malayalee Association	Germany

The 5th Garshom Awards were presented at Harihara Kalabhavan, Hyderabad, Andrapradesh on 29 December 2007 in a function graced by Sri. Madhu, senior cine artist and Sri Jagathi Sreekumar, cine artist.

== 4th Garshom Awards ==
Awardee	Award	Country
Jolly Thadathil	Garshom Pravasi Ratna Award	Germany
Syed Azhar	Garshom Yuva Pravasi Award	Bahrain
Sicily Jacob	Garshom Pravasi Vanitha Award	Nigeria
C V Raveendranath	Garshom Pravasi Returnee Award	India

The 4th Garshom Awards were presented by M V Rajasekharan, Minister of state for Planning, Govt. of India in a programme held at Somatheeram Health Resorts, Kovalam on 17 December 2006. Guests included T U Kuruvilla, PWD minister, Govt. of Keral;, Ivan Nigli, MLA from Karnataka; George Mercian, MLA from Kerala; Madhu, senior cine artist; and Baby Mathew Arambankudi, MD, Jeevan TV.

== 3rd Garshom Awards ==
Awardee	Award	Country
Andrew Pappachan	Garshom Pravasi Ratna Award	United States
Abdulla Manjeri	Garshom Yuva Pravasi Award	Saudi Arabia
Paul Jose	Garshom Pravasi Returnee Award	India

Oscar Fernandes, Hon. Minister for NRIs, Govt. of India, presented the Garshom Awards in a function held at The Park, New Delhi on 9 December 2005. The other dignitaries who graced the occasion were Babu Diwakaran, Labour minister, Govt. of Kerala; and Ivan Nigli, MLA from Karnataka.

== 2nd Garshom Awards ==
Awardee	Award	Country
Joseph Melookaran	Garshom Pravasi Ratna Award	United States
Priaya Chacko	Garshom Yuva Pravasi Award	Austria
Baiju Radhakrishnan	Garshom Pravasi Returnee Award	India

The Hon. Chief Minister, Govt. of Karnataka N. Dharam Singh presented the Garshom Awards in a well attended function held at St. John's Medical College Auditorium, Bangalore on 12 December 2004. Guests included Ivan Nigli, MLA from Karnataka, K J George, Karnataka PCC Gen. Secretary; and Mukesh, cine actor. A dance show was performed by artistes of Chitra School of Performing Arts, Bangalore.

== 1st Garshom Award ==
Awardee	Award	Country
Dr. Polly Mathew	Garshom Pravasi Ratna Award	Germany

The first Garshom Award was presented to Dr. Polly Mathew from Germany in a colourful function held at the Chowdaiah Memorial Hall, Bangalore by J. Alexander, MLA, Govt. of Karnataka on 27 July 2003. The other guests present were K. B. Ganesh Kumar, MLA from Kerala; Madhu, senior cine actor and Mr. Jins Paul, founder, Garshom.
