= Garden City University =

Private university in Bangalore, India

Coordinates: 12.9800°N 77.6371°E

- Motto: EMPHASIS ON LIFE
- Type: Private
- Established: 2013
- Chancellor: Dr. Joseph V. G.
- Vice-Chancellor: G. R. Naik
- Undergraduates: 2500
- Postgraduates: 2500
- Location: Bengaluru, Karnataka, India
- Website: www.gardencity.university

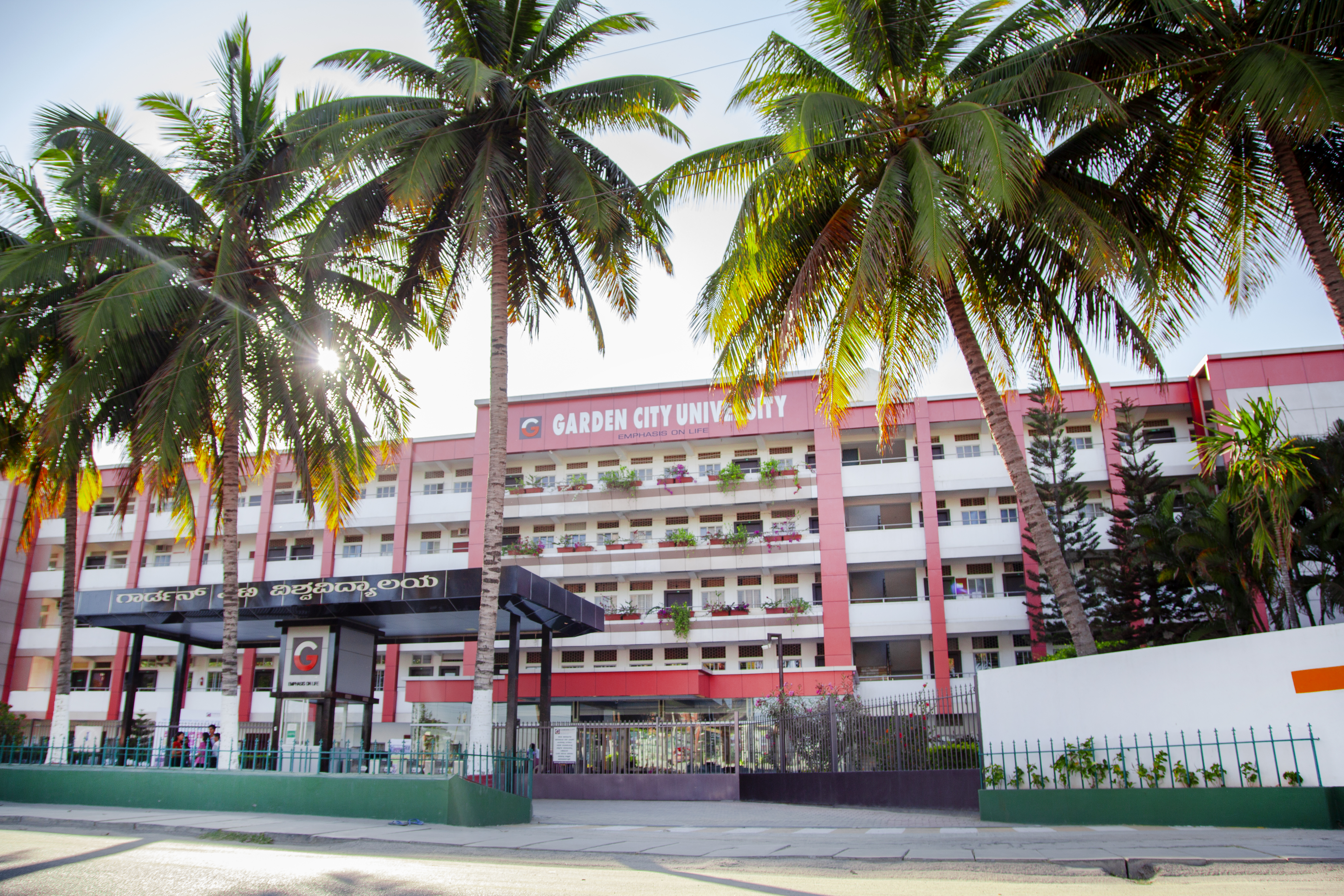
Outlook of the GCU Main Campus Building (Bangalore)

Garden City University, formally known as Garden City College is a private university located in Bangalore, Karnataka, India.

Established in the year 1992, Garden City University was formed by Dr. Joseph V.G with other contemporaries like Prof. Shivarudrappa who is a former dean of Karnataka University, Dr. Hanumanthappa who is a former vice-chancellor of Bangalore University, Prof. V.B.Coutinho, vice-chancellor of Gulbarga University, and Prof. Rame Gowda who is a former vice-chancellor of Karnataka State Open University.

== Academics ==
=== The School of Management ===
Established in the year 1994, the commerce and management department is one of the oldest and the largest in the entire Garden City University Campus.

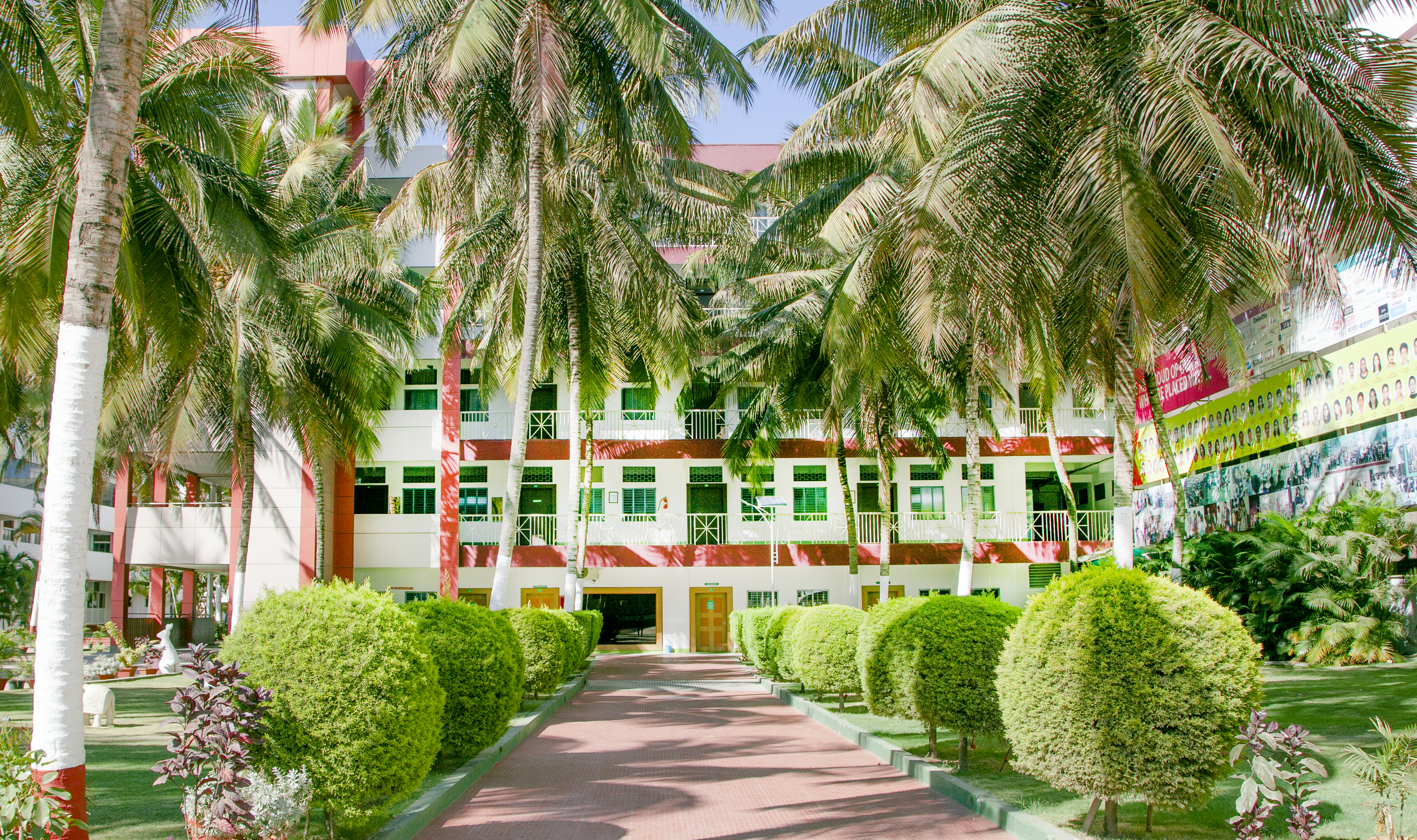
Garden Area of Garden City University (Bangalore)

=== The School of Sciences ===
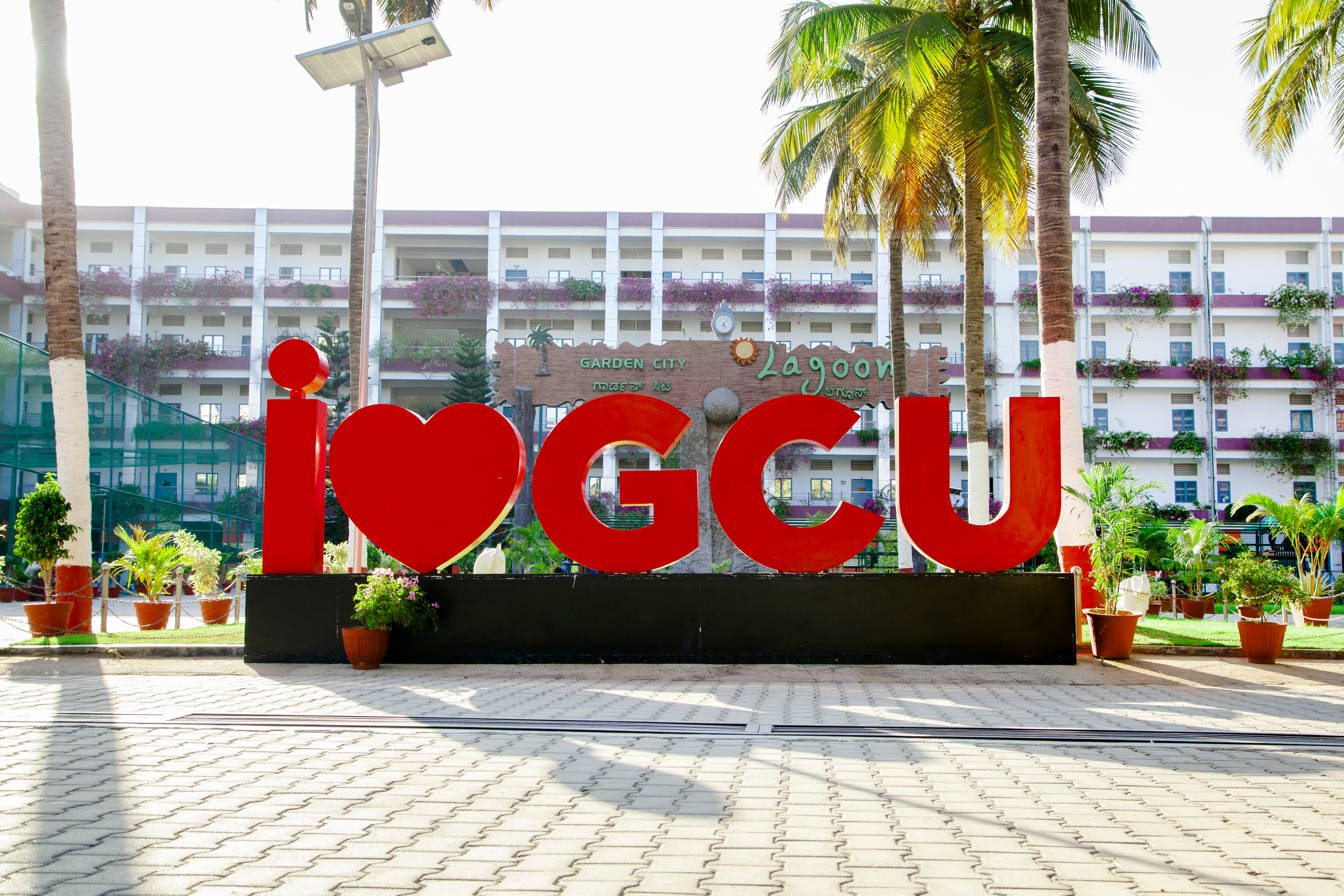
Garden City University Welcomes you (Bangalore)

Established in the year 1995.

=== The School of Media ===
Established in the year 1997.

=== The School of Computational Science and Information Technology ===
Established in the year 1995. Some of the modules include webinars, simulated software, live projects, etc.

=== The School of Indian & Foreign Languages ===
Established in the year 1994, the school of languages functions as a supporting school for all other branches at the Garden City University. The main focus is to introduce a wider range of literature in English and other foreign languages. At the primary level, this school offers various opportunities for its students a plethora of programs such as novels, plays, and poetry. And in the secondary level, the students are exposed to political issues and socio-cultural issues that the students can connect with the contemporary literature.

=== The School of Social Science ===
This school was started in the year 1994 at the Garden City University.

== Awards ==
Garshom International Awards - Best Institution Award 2017
