= P K Abdulla Koya =

Indian entrepreneur (born 1957)

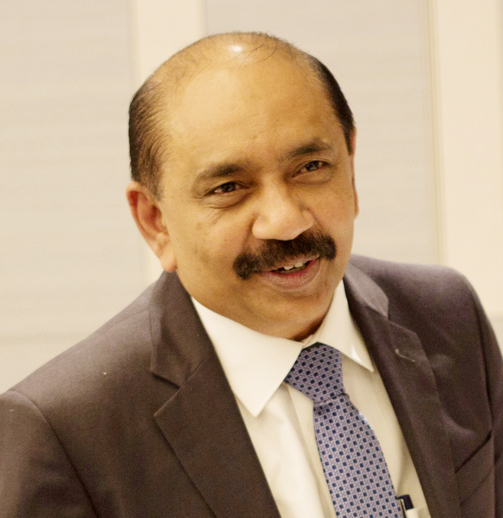
- Born: 13 February 1957 (age 69); Kozhikode, Kerala, India
- Occupations: Founder & Chairman, AKNOVEL Group, Vice Chairman MVR Cancer Centre & Research Institute
- Spouse: Naseema
- Children: 4

Palliyulla Kariat Abdulla Koya (P K Abdulla Koya) (born 13 February 1957) is an Indian entrepreneur from Abu Dhabi and Garshom Award winner. He is the founder and chairman of the AKNOVEL Group..|. Abdulla Koya has helped over 50,000 people across country to gain self-employment.

== Early life ==
Abdulla Koya is from Calicut in North Kerala. He is the third son of the late Kasmi Koya and Beevi. He was forced to find out small jobs as daily wages to support his family. He worked in several sectors for earning the minimum to help his family. In 1978, Abdulla Koya arrived in United Arab Emirates.

== Personal life ==
Abdulla Koya is married to Nazeema and has four children – Noora, Majidha, Ahamed Zayed and Shymah.

== Career history ==
Koya established branded stamp products such as Sun Stamper with Japanese Technology during 1998 by providing products to the common business segment by associating with international manufactures and Addprint. Koya entered the supply of telecommunication equipment, in the telecom and Power Project field through MELTRAX Electro Mechanical & communication system. His other notable diversification are M/S National Tile Works, Beta Granite (P) Ltd, Walayar steels, Musou Micro Flash Foams Pvt Ltd., Crest Wood.

Koya is also the Vice Chairman of CARE (The Cancer and Allied Ailments Research) Foundation.

== Philanthropy ==
Currently, he is the Vice Chairman of MVR Cancer Centre & Research Institute. He has done various philanthropic activities across India.

== Awards ==
- Garshom International Award 2018
