= All Malaysia Malayalee Association =

Organization of Malayalees

All Malaysia Malayalee Association അഖില മലേഷ്യ മലയാളീ സംഘടന
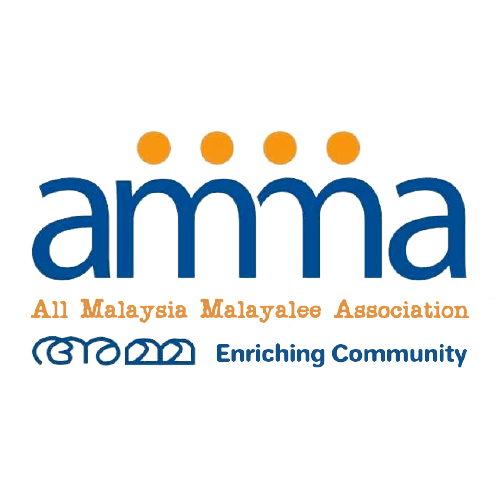
- Abbreviation: AMMA
- Formation: 30 August 1972
- Type: Educational, Linguistic, Cultural Organization
- Region served: Malaysia
- Official language: Malayalam, English, Bahasa Malaysia
- Website: www.amma.org.my

All Malaysia Malayalee Association (Malayalam: അഖില മലേഷ്യ മലയാളീ സംഘടന, romanized: Akhila Malēṣya Malayāḷī Saṅghaṭana) or abbreviated as AMMA is an umbrella body for the various Malaysian Malayali associations/samajams throughout Malaysia. The principal aim is to foster closer co-operation with all Malayali organisations in Malaysia and also with all the other Indian organisations for the betterment of the Indian community in Malaysia. The organisation was formed on 30 August 1972. From the beginning, it remain the co-ordinating body of the Malayali Associations of Malaysia, and continues to emphasise its commitment to the education, welfare, culture and economic well being of the Malaysian Malayali community. The organisation does not have individual membership, but has a membership of fifteen Affiliate Malayali organisations across Malaysia including itself.

== Affiliates ==
The affiliates of the organisation are as follows:

| Sl.No | Affiliates | SSM |
|---|---|---|
| 1 | North Malaysia Malayali Samajam (NMMS) | PPM-003-07-28041952 |
| 2 | Selangor & Federal Territory Malayalee Association (SFTMA) | PPM-004-14-22051953 |
| 3 | Negeri Sembilan Kerala Samajam (NSKS) | PPM-004-05-30011956 |
| 4 | Malaysian Malayalee Catholic Association (MMCA) | PPM-002-14-06061958 |
| 5 | Perak Malayalee Association (PMA) | PPM-003-08-27071964 |
| 6 | Lower Perak Malayalee Association (LPMA) | PPM-001-08-26071967 |
| 7 | Kuantan Malayalee Samajam (KMS) | PPM-001-06-21101980 |
| 8 | North Perak Malayalee Samajam (NPMS) | PPM-003-08-04081981 |
| 9 | West Pahang Malayalee Association (WPMA) | PPM-001-06-16021981 |
| 10 | Johor Bahru Malayalee Association (JBMA) | PPM-004-01-14081985 |
| 11 | Malacca Kerala Samajam (MKS) | PPM-003-04-05061986 |
| 12 | Sungai Siput Malayalee Association (SSMA) | PPM-002-08-18061987 |
| 13 | Kluang Malayalee Association (KMA) | PPM-006-01-09101989 |
| 14 | Persatuan Malabari Malaysia (PMM) | PPM-007-10-22111999 |
| 15 | Klang Malayalee Association (MAMANGAM) | PPM-002-10-30052000 |
| 16 | Port Dickson Malayalee Association (PDMA) | PPM-011-05-15092008 |
| 17 | Jempol Malayalee Association (JMA) | PPM-002-05-15112010 |
| 18 | Tg Malim Malayalee Association (TMMA) | PPM-014-08-27092011 |
| 19 | Hulu Langat Malayalee Sanghadana (HLMS) | PPM-014-10-31032011 |
| 20 | Putrajaya Malayalee Association (PUTRAMAS) | PPM-015-16-10072012 |
| 21 | Sitiawan Malayalee Association (SMA) | PPM-018-08-08102012 |
| 22 | Slim River Malayalee Association (SRMA) | PPM-028-08-07092012 |

== Awards ==
Garshom Best Malayalee Association Award 2011 - Garshom International Award 2011

== See also ==
- Malaysian Malayali
