= P. A. Ibrahim Haji =

Indian entrepreneur and philanthropist (1943–2021)

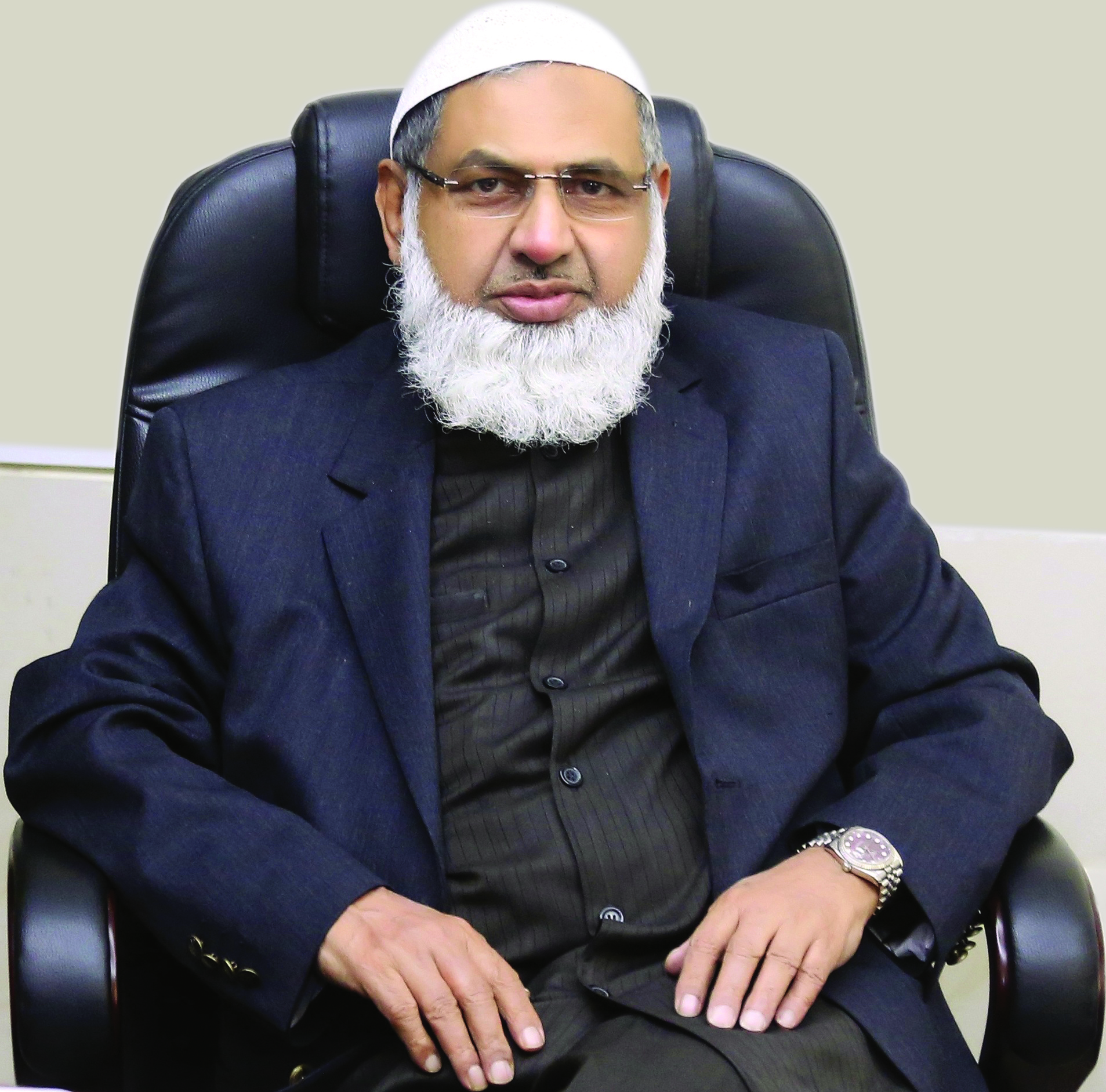
- Born: Pallikere Abdulla Ibrahim; 6 September 1943; Kasaragod, British India
- Died: 21 December 2021 (aged 78); Kozhikode, Kerala, India
- Occupations: Entrepreneur, philanthropist
- Parent(s): Abdulla Ibrahim Haji, Aysha
- Awards: Pravasi Ratna; C H Award; Garshom International Award 2017

Pallikere Abdulla Ibrahim Haji (6 September 1943 – 21 December 2021) was an Indian entrepreneur and philanthropist based in the United Arab Emirates. He had investments in the education, automotive, and jewellery industries. He was the chairman of the PACE Education group, founder and vice-chairman of the Indus Motor Company, and the co-chairman of Malabar Gold.

Ibrahim was a recipient of the Indian government's Pravasi Ratna award in 2015.

== Early life ==
Ibrahim was born on 6 September 1943, in Pallikkere, in Kasaragod in the modern Indian state of Kerala, to Abdulla Ibrahim Haji, a textile merchant, and Aysha. He attended the government Mappila LP School, and later the Kottikulam Government Fisheries High School. After completing his schooling, he pursued his diploma in automobile engineering in Chennai.

== Career ==
Ibrahim emigrated to Dubai in the United Arab Emirates in 1966, traveling in a boat from India. He started his career in the UAE working in the automotive spare parts division of Austin Car distributors, which was owned by Ali Bin Abdulla Al Owais, for a salary of 400 riyals. Speaking later about his beginnings, he would recount that he lived in the Oonth Bazaar (transl. camel market) neighborhood of the city, sharing a room with 10 other men. He later moved to the Al Ras neighborhood. He started his entrepreneurial journey in the UAE in 1974 with his own garments business before branching into cosmetics. In 1976, he expanded into the trading business, starting Century Trading Company and later into the jewellery business.

Ibrahim ventured into the education space in 1999 by setting up the PACE Education Group. The group operates schools and colleges in India, the UAE, and Kuwait, with over 20,000 students from over 25 countries. He also operated schools in Kerala, including the RIMs International School and the Manjeri Pace Residential School, and five other institutions in Mangalore, in Karnataka. He was also the co-chairman of the Malabar Group, a retailer of gold and diamonds, and the founder and vice-chairman of the Indus Motor Company. He was a director of the Muslim Printing and Publishing Company, the publishers of Chandrika the mouthpiece of the Indian Union Muslim League.

Ibrahim was also the co-founder of the India-Arab foundation in 1981, in advance of the then Indian prime minister Indira Gandhi's visit to the UAE. He also drove many of his charity and community development initiatives through his trust. He was known to have driven a campaign to have international flights operate out of the Calicut airport. Ibrahim received the UAE Golden Visa in 2021 in recognition of his services to the country.

== Death ==
On 11 December 2021, Ibrahim suffered a stroke in Dubai. He was then moved to Kozhikode in an air ambulance, before dying on 21 December 2021, at the age of 78, at Aster MIMS hospital in Kozhikode. His funeral was completed at Najmul Huda Arabic College Madrasa in Vettekode, Manjeri.

== Honours ==
- Board of Governors of the APJ Abdul Kalam Technological University, the affiliation body for technical education in Kerala, India.
- C H Award in memory of C. H. Mohammed Koya, former Kerala Chief Minister of Kerala
- Pravasi Ratna (September 2005) Awarded at the NRI Global Meet
- Garshom Lifetime Achievement Award 2017
- K. Avukader Kutty Naha Memorial Award 2013
- K.S. Abdullah Memorial Award 2016 Presented by Kasaragod KMCC Sharjah Committee
- Honorary degree of Doctor of Letters, Honoris Causa (Hon. D.Litt.), by the University of Science and Technology, Meghalaya
