= Islamic state debate in Malaysia =

Debate over Malaysia's status as a secular or Islamic state

The historical debate over whether Malaysia is a secular state or an Islamic state dates back to the Federation of Malaya's independence from the British Empire in 1957 and the formation of Malaysia in 1963.

== Content of debate ==
Broadly speaking, a secular state is based on the concept of secularism. A secular state maintains a neutral stance in religious matters — it supports neither religion nor irreligion. It regards individuals of different faiths as equal, without favoring or discriminating against any particular religion, and it safeguards both freedom of religion and freedom of expression. Furthermore, a secular state does not establish an official religion, and its politics and governance are not influenced by religion — in other words, there is a separation of religion and state.

The foundation of an Islamic state lies in Islamic law (Sharia). Such a government recognizes the legal authority of Islamic law, establishes Islam as the official religion, and practices a system where religion and politics are integrated — either through theocracy or religious governance.

=== Defining Malaysia as a Secular state ===
The view that Malaysia is a secular state is generally accepted among the non-indigenous (non-Bumiputera) communities in Malaysia and is also a stance supported by many multiracial political parties.

Tunku Abdul Rahman, Malaysia's first Prime Minister and widely regarded as the Father of the Nation, once stated that Malaysia should not become an Islamic state. At his 80th birthday celebration organized by the Barisan Nasional coalition on February 8, 1983, he emphasized that the Federation of Malaya was established as a secular state, and that Islam was designated as the official religion under the Constitution.

Tunku Abdul Rahman also stressed that religious and moral laws should not be introduced, as Malaysia is a multiracial country with diverse beliefs. Therefore, he asserted that Malaysia must remain a secular state with Islam as the official religion.

=== Defining Malaysia as an Islamic state ===
In 2001, then-Prime Minister Mahathir Mohamad declared that Malaysia is an Islamic state during the general assembly of Gerakan, a component party of the Barisan Nasional coalition.

On July 17, 2007, then-Deputy Prime Minister Najib Abdul Razak, speaking on behalf of then-Prime Minister Abdullah Ahmad Badawi at the opening ceremony of the international conference titled "The Role of an Islamic State in a Globalised World," told reporters that Malaysia has never been a secular state. He explained that the Western definition of a secular state differs significantly from the Islamic principles upon which Malaysia is governed. However, he also emphasized that UMNO's concept of an Islamic state is different from that of the Islamic Party of Malaysia (PAS). Najib further asserted that Malaysia is "an Islamic state with its own characteristics."

=== Constitution stance ===
Article 3(1) of the Federal Constitution of Malaysia states that Islam is the religion of the Federation; however, it also guarantees the right of individuals to freedom of religion. The Constitution itself does not explicitly declare whether Malaysia is an "Islamic state" or a "secular state."

Islam is the religion of the Federation; but other religions may be practised in peace and harmony in any part of the Federation.

— Constitution of Malaysia Article 3(1)

== Historical background ==
=== Spread of Islam in Malay Peninsular ===
Arab traders introduced Islam to the Malay Archipelago, the Indochinese Peninsula, and China in the early 7th century. Prior to this, the inhabitants of the Malay Peninsula generally practiced Hinduism or Buddhism. The Cham people of Cambodia converted to Islam, with the origins of their conversion reportedly tracing back to Jahsh ibn Riyab, a companion of the Prophet Muhammad. In 674 CE, the Arabs brought Islam to the coastal regions of Sumatra.

Indian Muslim traders also played a significant role in introducing Islam to the Malay Peninsula in the 12th century. Through the efforts of Indian merchants who had recently converted to Islam, Sultan Mudzafar Shah I of Kedah became the first Malay ruler to embrace Islam and establish a sultanate. This event is often regarded as the earliest establishment of Islam on the Malay Peninsula.

In the 13th century, the second ruler of the Malacca Sultanate, Iskandar Shah, converted to Islam after marrying a princess from Pasai. His conversion marked a pivotal moment in the Islamization of the Malay Peninsula.

=== British colonial period ===
British influence began entering the Malay Peninsula in 1785, at a time when the vast majority of the local population were Muslims. To meet the economic demands of colonial development in both the Malay Peninsula and Borneo, the British brought in large numbers of Chinese and Indian laborers. This large-scale migration indirectly led to the emergence of a multi-religious society in the region.

During the 18th century, Malaya's economic importance to Europe grew rapidly. In particular, the tea trade between Britain and China drove up demand for high-quality tin from Malaya, which was used to line tea chests due to its moisture-resistant properties. Malayan pepper was also highly prized in Europe, and gold was discovered in Kelantan and Pahang. The development of tin and gold mining, along with related industries, attracted the first wave of foreign migrants into the Malay world — initially Arabs and Indians, followed by Chinese immigrants. The Chinese settled in towns and quickly came to dominate economic activities. This laid the foundation for a social pattern that would persist for the next 200 years: rural Malays increasingly came under the economic influence of wealthy, urban migrant communities — a dynamic that even Malay rulers could not resist.

From 1942 to 1945, the region was occupied by Japan, delivering a major blow to British influence in East Asia. Although the occupation was relatively short, it sparked anti-colonial nationalism in British Malaya and other parts of the region. Malay nationalism in turn triggered a reaction among the Chinese community, who feared the rise of Malay dominance and Islamic political influence. As a result, many Chinese joined the Malayan Communist Party. The communist insurgency was eventually suppressed through heavy-handed military action by the British and political compromises between Malay and Chinese leaders.

=== Drafting of Federal Constitution ===
In March 1956, the government of the British-ruled Federation of Malaya established the Reid Commission to draft the Federal Constitution of Malaya, paving the way for full self-governance and independence. To this end, Queen Elizabeth II and the Malay rulers appointed five members to the commission. The commission was composed of constitutional experts from various Commonwealth countries and was chaired by the distinguished British politician, Lord William Reid. Originally, a representative from Canada was also appointed, but was unable to attend the commission's meetings due to health reasons.

The original draft of the Federal Constitution of Malaya did not explicitly designate an official religion for the country. At the time, however, the nine Malay rulers unanimously agreed that Islam was suitable to be the official religion of their respective states. Abdul Hamid, a Pakistani judge serving on the Reid Commission, strongly advocated for Islam to be recognized as the official religion, which ultimately led to Islam being established as the religion of the Federation.

On August 31, 1957, the Federation of Malaya gained independence from the British Empire. On September 16, 1963, the Federation of Malaya, Sabah, Sarawak, and Singapore merged to form Malaysia. As a result, the Federal Constitution of Malaya was amended and renamed the Federal Constitution of Malaysia. The provision recognizing Islam as the religion of the Federation was retained in the revised constitution.

== Stance of prime ministers ==
#	Prime Minister	Image	Tenure	Party affiliation	Stance
1	Tunku Abdul Rahman		31 August 1957- 22 September 1970	Alliance（ UMNO）	Malaysia is a secular state with Islam as its official religion.
2	Tun Abdul Razak		22 September 1970- 14 January 1976	Alliance（UMNO） BN（ UMNO）	Malaysia is a secular state with Islam as its official religion.
3	Tun Hussein Onn		15 January 1976- 16 July 1981	BN（ UMNO）	Malaysia is a secular state with Islam as its official religion.
4	Tun Mahathir Mohamad		16 July 1981 - 30 October 2003	BN（ UMNO）	Malaysia is an Islamic state.
5	Tun Abdullah Badawi		31 October 2003 - 3 April 2009	BN（ UMNO）	Malaysia is an Islamic state.
6	Najib Razak		3 April 2009 - 9 May 2018	BN（ UMNO）	Malaysia is an Islamic state.
7	Tun Mahathir Mohamad		10 May 2018- 24 February 2020	PH（ PPBM）	During his second term as Prime Minister, there was no official stance on the matter.
8	Muhyiddin Yassin		1 March 2020- 16 August 2021	PN（ PPBM）	No official statement was issued.
9	Ismail Sabri Yaakob		21 August 2021- 24 November 2022	BN（ UMNO）	No official statement was issued.
10	Anwar Ibrahim		24 November 2022: Incumbent	PH（ PKR）	Malaysia is a secular state with Islam as its official religion, but politics and religion are inseparable. However, the implementation of Islamic criminal law will never be realized.

== See also ==
- Religion in Malaysia
- Secular state
- Islamic world
- Islamic state
- State religion
