= Religion in Malaysia =

Religion in Malaysia (2020 census)
1. Sunni Islam (63.5%)
2. Buddhism (18.7%)
3. Christianity (9.10%)
4. Hinduism (6.10%)
5. No religion (1.80%)
6. Other religions (0.90%)

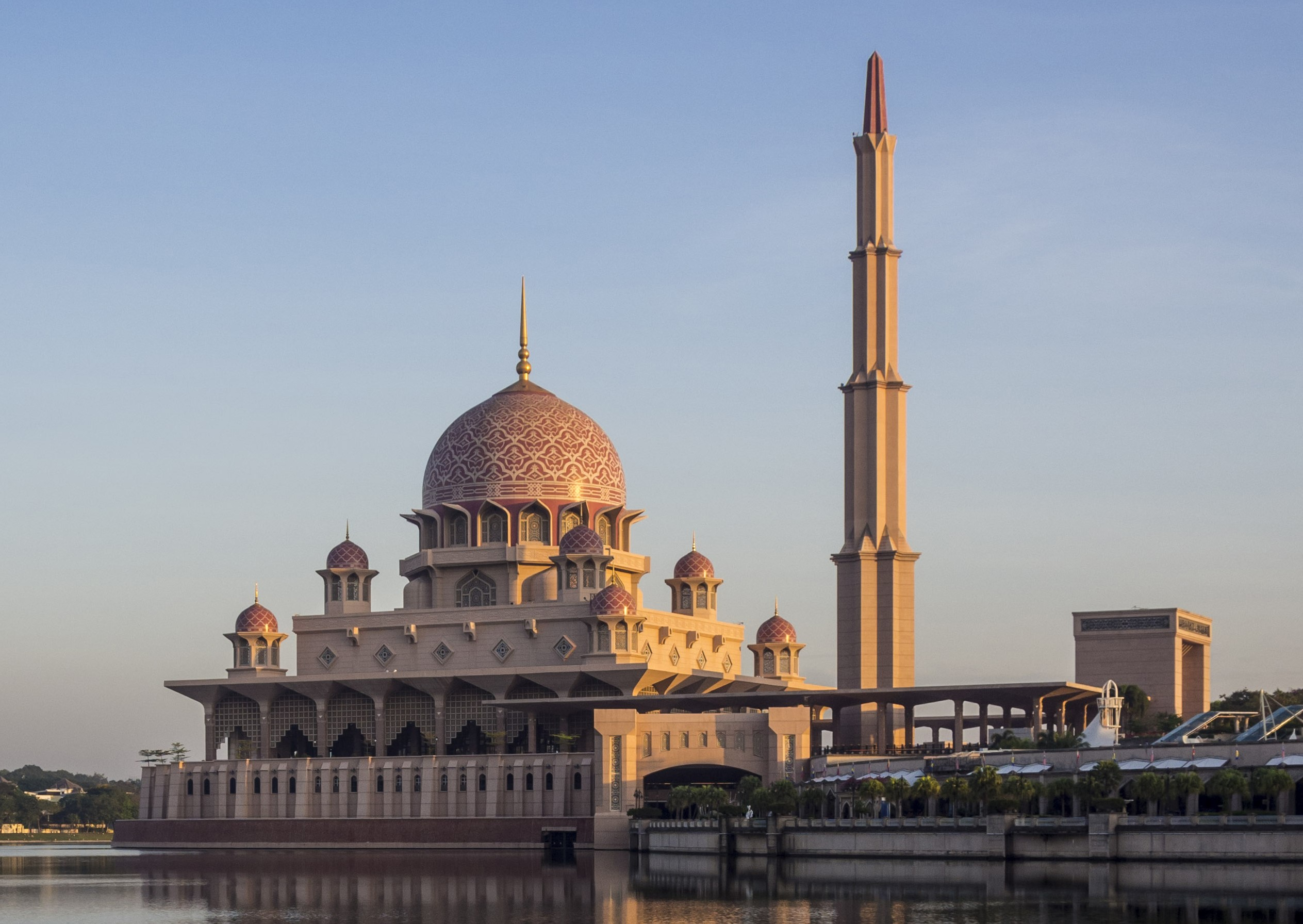
The Putra Mosque in Putrajaya, built by Malay Muslims.

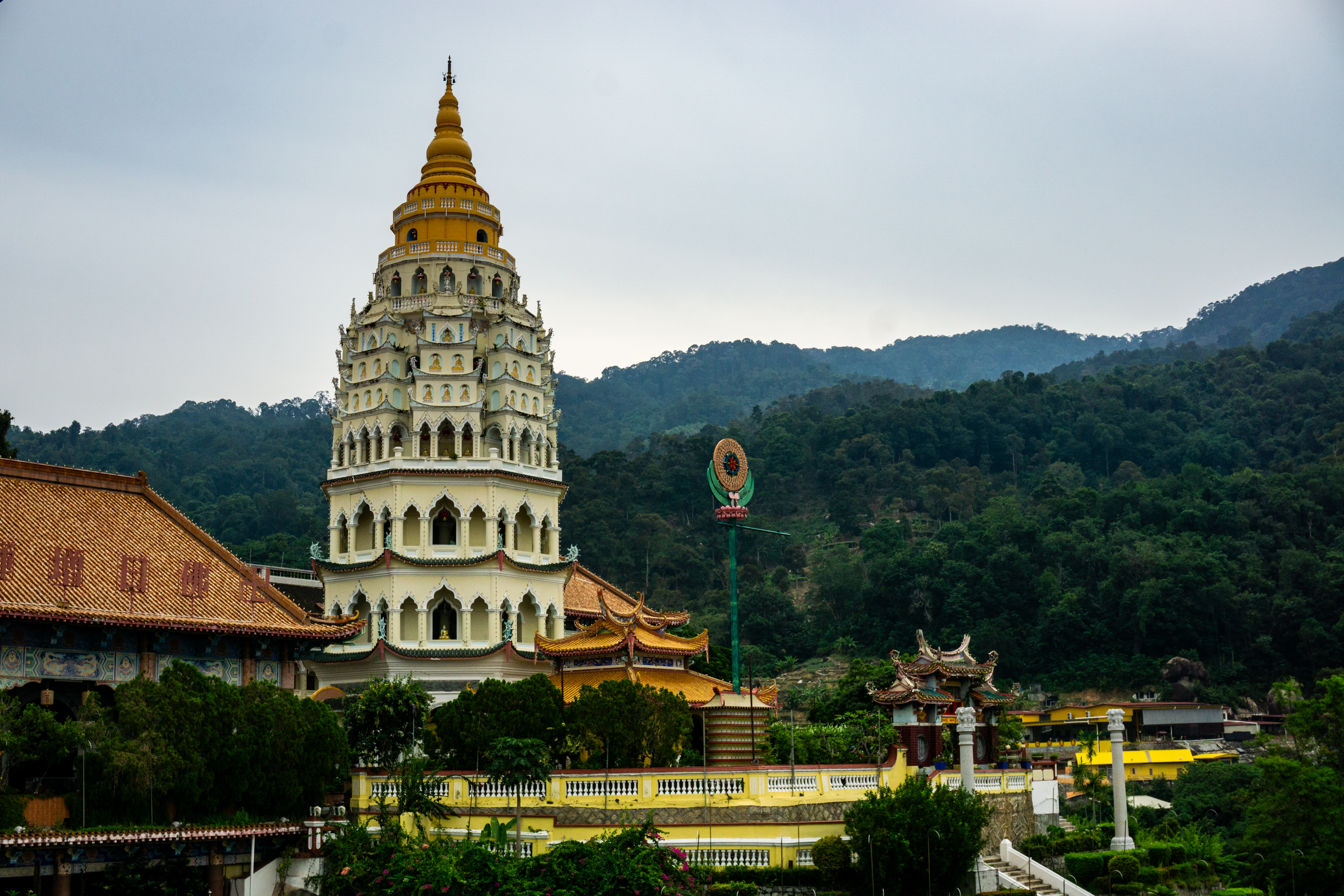
The Kek Lok Si Temple in George Town, built by Chinese Buddhists.

Islam is the state religion of Malaysia, as per Article 3 of the Constitution. Meanwhile, other religions can be practised by non-Malay citizens of the country. In addition, per Article 160, one must be Muslim to be considered Malay. As of the 2020 Population and Housing Census, 63.5 percent of the population practices Islam; 18.7 percent Buddhism; 9.1 percent Christianity; 6.1 percent Hinduism; and 2.7 percent other religion or gave no information. The remainder is accounted for by other faiths, including Indigenous religions, Sikhism, Baháʼí Faith and other belief systems. The states of Sarawak and Penang and the federal territory of Kuala Lumpur have non-Muslim majorities. Numbers of self-described atheists in Malaysia are few as renouncing Islam is prohibited for Muslims in Malaysia. As such, the actual number of atheists or converts in the country is hard to ascertain out of fear of being ostracised or prosecuted. The state has come under criticism from human rights organisations for the government's discrimination against atheists, with some cabinet members saying that "the freedom of religion is not the freedom from religion".

Islam in Malaysia is represented by the Shafi'i version of Sunni theology and the practice of any other form of the religion (such as Shia Islam) is heavily restricted by the government. The constitution guarantees freedom of religion while establishing Islam as the "religion of the Federation" to symbolise its importance to Malaysian society. Malaysian Chinese practice various faiths: Mahayana Buddhism, Chinese traditional religions (including Taoism), and Theravada Buddhism (along with Siamese, Burmese, Sinhalese and Indians). Hinduism is practised by the majority of Malaysian Indians. Christianity has established itself in some communities, especially in East Malaysia.

Relations between Islam and the other religious groups in the country are generally quite tolerant, even though members of different religious groups do tend to have more homogeneous personal relations, particularly based on ethnicity and religion. Eids, Wesak, Christmas, Lunar New Year, and Deepavali have been declared national holidays. Race, religion and politics are closely intertwined in Malaysia, and various groups have been set up to try to promote religious understanding among the different groups.

== Religious distribution ==
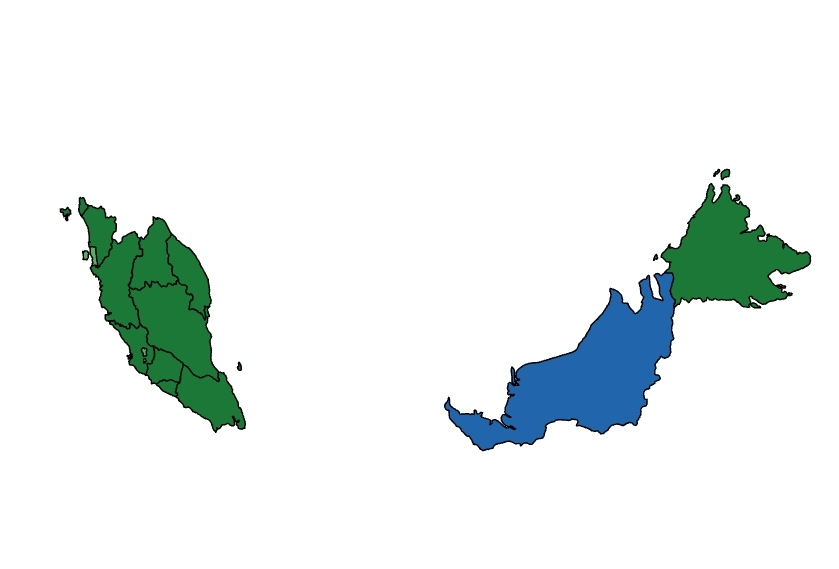
Dominant religious confessions in Malaysia by state according to 2020 census: Dark green: Muslim majority > 50% Light green: Muslim plurality < 50% Blue: Christian majority > 50%

All of the world's major religions have substantial representation in Malaysia. The Population and Housing Censuses figures shows approximately these proportions of the population following these religions:

Year	Islam	Buddhism	Christianity	Hinduism	Confucianism, Taoism and other traditional Chinese folk religion	Other religions	No religion or no information
2000	60.4%	19.2%	9.1%	6.3%	2.6%		2.4%
2010	61.3%	19.8%	9.2%	6.3%		1.7%	1.7%
2020	63.5%	18.7%	9.1%	6.1%		0.9%	1.8%

All the Malaysian Malay people are Muslim by law. Most Malaysian Chinese follow Mahayana Buddhism, Chinese traditional religion (including Taoism, Confucianism, and ancestor worship), or Theravada Buddhism. Statistics from the 2010 Census indicate that 83.6% of Malaysia's ethnic Chinese identify as Buddhist, with significant numbers of adherents following Taoism (3.4%) and Christianity (11.1%). The percentage of practitioners of the Chinese folk religions may be higher, as many practise both Buddhism and folk religions.

Christianity is the predominant religion of the non-Malay Bumiputra community (46.5%) with an additional 40.4% identifying as Muslims. Many indigenous tribes of East Malaysia have converted to Christianity, although Christianity has made fewer inroads into Peninsular Malaysia.

== Religion by regions ==
=== States ===
States	Islam	Buddhism	Christianity	Hinduism	Confucianism, Taoism and other traditional Chinese folk religion	Other religions	No religion or No information
Johor	59.7%	28.7%	3.0%	7.1%	-	0.8%	0.7%
Kedah	78.5%	12.4%	0.8%	5.9%	-	0.8%	2.0%
Kelantan	95.5%	2.8%	0.4%	0.2%	-	0.2%	0.9%
Malacca	68.9%	19.2%	2.6%	5.3%	-	0.5%	3.5%
Negeri Sembilan	62.6%	19.9%	2.6%	13.1%	-	0.5%	1.0%
Pahang	76.5%	13.6%	1.5%	3.7%	-	0.7%	4.1%
Penang	45.5%	37.6%	4.3%	8.4%	-	2.4%	1.7%
Perak	57.9%	24.2%	3.0%	9.7%	-	1.3%	4.0%
Perlis	87.8%	9.2%	0.6%	1.3%	-	0.2%	1.0%
Sabah	69.6%	5.1%	24.7%	0.1%	-	0.1%	0.4%
Sarawak	34.2%	12.8%	50.1%	0.2%	-	0.5%	2.2%
Selangor	61.1%	21.6%	4.9%	10.3%	-	1.3%	0.8%
Terengganu	97.3%	2.0%	0.3%	0.2%	-	0.0%	0.1%

=== Federal territories ===
States	Islam	Buddhism	Christianity	Hinduism	Confucianism, Taoism and other traditional Chinese folk religion	No religion	Other religions or No information
Kuala Lumpur	45.3%	32.3%	6.4%	8.2%	-	6.0%	1.8%
Labuan	77.2%	8.1%	13.8%	0.6%	-	0.1%	0.2%
Putrajaya	97.2%	0.5%	0.8%	1.1%	-	0.4%	0.1%

=== Distribution maps ===
Below maps are distribution of religion in Malaysia by district, as of 2020 census.

Islam

Buddhist

Christian

Hindu

== Law and politics ==
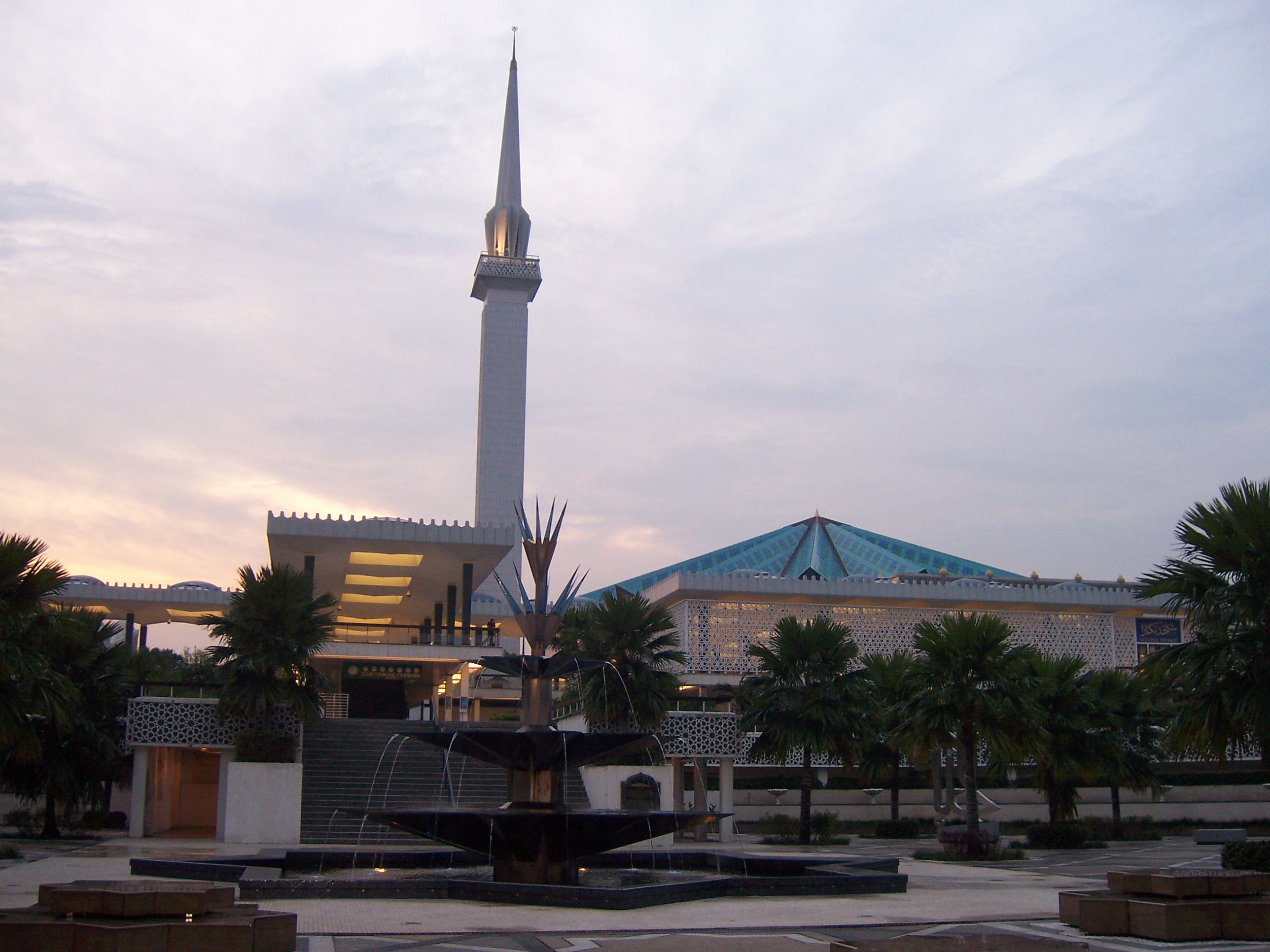
The National Mosque of Malaysia in Kuala Lumpur, built to celebrate independence

Malaysia is a multi-religious society, but while the Malaysian constitution theoretically guarantees freedom of religion, Islam is the official religion of the federation, as well as the legally presumed faith of all ethnic Malays. No ethnic Malay is allowed to leave Islam, while non-Malay Muslims seeking to apostatise require permission from a sharia court, which is rarely granted. Religious beliefs follow ethnic lines.

Holidays have been declared for holy days in numerous religions, although only Islam has more than one national holiday. Whether a religion obtains approval of the government is determined by the Registrar of Societies, part of the Ministry of Home Affairs. Only upon approval do they qualify for government benefits. However, unrecognised groups such as the Falun Gong can practise by registering themselves under the Companies Act, although this means that technical violations of the act can result in a fine.

The government believes the constitution provides a strong enough guarantee of religious freedom and should not be changed. Some restrictions are made on Malay texts from non-Islamic religions in Peninsular Malaysia; however, there are much less restrictions in East Malaysia. Government-controlled bodies exerted pressure upon non-Muslim women to wear headscarves. In November 2005 the minister of higher education stated that non-Muslim women students at the International Islamic University of Malaysia in Kuala Lumpur must wear headscarves when attending lectures and during graduation ceremonies. In March 2006 the leader of the Royal Malaysian Police stated that all female police officers, including non-Muslims, should wear headscarves during public ceremonies. The MyKad identity card states whether the holder is a Muslim or not.

As Islam is the state religion, the government provides financial support to Islamic establishments and enforces the Sunni form of Islam. State governments can impose Islamic law on Muslims, and the government will offer grants to private Muslim schools that allow a government-approved curriculum and supervision. The government also indirectly funds non-Islamic communities, although to a much smaller degree. The government generally does not interfere with the religious practices of non-Muslim communities. Public schools offer an Islamic religious instruction course which is compulsory for Muslim students, and non-Muslim students take a morals and ethics course.

The government prohibits any publications that it feels will incite racial or religious disharmony, and has asked that religious matters not be discussed in public due to their sensitivity. It claims nobody has been arrested under the Internal Security Act for religious reasons. The government may demolish unregistered religious places of worship, and nongovernmental organisations have complained about the demolition of unregistered Hindu temples. These were often constructed on privately owned plantations prior to independence in 1957. After independence plantations became government property. In 2006 the state of Negeri Sembilan announced the demolition of a Hindu temple, although the temple sought injunction and took it to court. State governments control mosques, appoint imams, and provide guidance for sermon content. The conflict between the federal and state governments over religious authority led to a slow pace of reform and development of laws relating to Islam. Other religious groups, such as the Malaysian Consultative Council of Buddhism, Christianity, Hinduism, Sikhism and Taoism (MCCBCHST), have supported political rallies.

Political parties are usually closely linked to particular ethnicities, and thus in the case of Malay political parties, to Islam. Views on religion and its role in politics thus affects voting. This is particularly prominent for the Pan-Malaysian Islamic Party (PAS), which seeks an officially Islamic state. In the state of Kelantan, which PAS has governed since 1990, laws based on hudud have been enacted. Nonetheless, PAS participates within the democratic system and has moderated at times to win votes, even making political alliances with non-Muslim parties when advantageous.

Both Barisan Nasional (BN) and the opposition PAS party have attempted to deliver political messages using mosques in the states they govern. All civil servants must attend government-approved religion classes. BN has banned opposition-affiliated imams from mosques, enforced restrictions on sermons, replaced opposition sympathetic mosque leaders and governing committees, and closed down unauthorised mosques affiliated with the opposition. The state government of Selangor in August 2005 withheld visas from foreign imams to try to increase the number of local imams. PAS, which controls the state of Kelantan restricts imams affiliated with BN from their mosques. It is thought that support for a moderate Islam led to the 2004 election victory of BN over PAS in the state of Terengganu. Both parties became more Islamic in the 1980s and 1990s to try to obtain more of the Malay vote. Political problems are often portrayed as religious issues.

=== Secularism ===
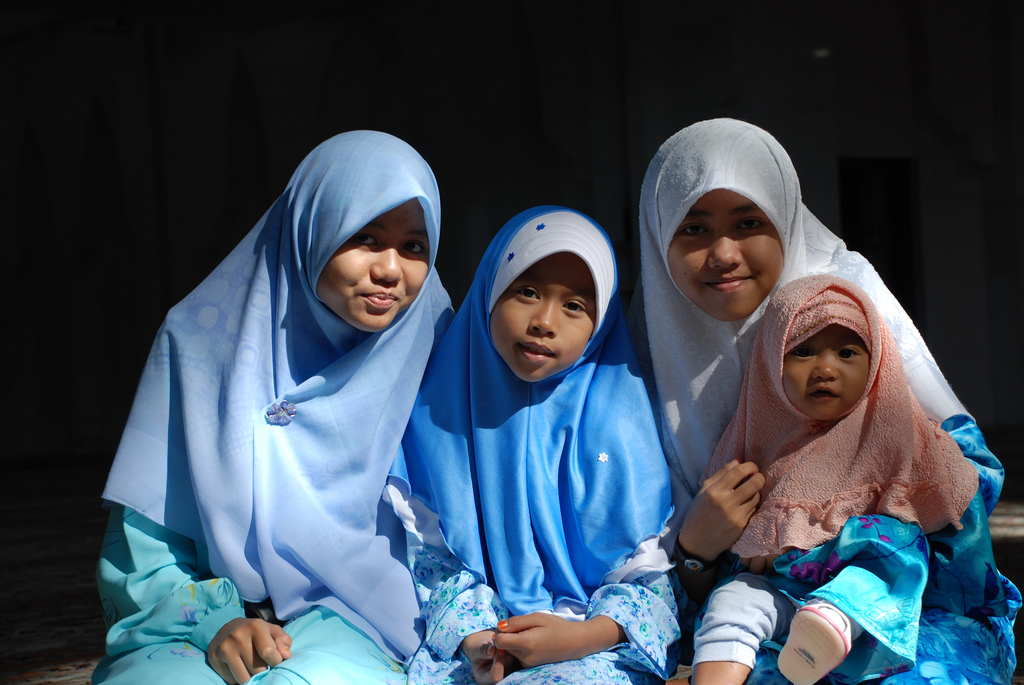
The tudung is very commonly worn by Malay girls and women

Despite the recognition of Islam as the state religion in the constitution, when created it was explicitly noted that the status was merely a symbolic one. It was not seen as something to be used as a basis of law, except by some Malay nationalists. Currently a dispute exists between those who promote a secular interpretation of the federal constitution and those who believe Shariah courts and Islamic law should have supremacy. The movement towards a more Islamic society, known as dakwah, is often viewed as an effort to resist western influences. Secular values are often favoured by the Malay elite, who welcome the shared goals of industrial development. It is, however, opposed by Muslims who see it as an invasion of western culture and worldview. Support for a more Islamic society often comes from the more rural population of Malays.

The practice of secular government, separating religious matters from other aspects of governance, was first put into practice following the Pangkor Treaty of 1874. While this treaty placed most aspects of governance under British control, the Sultan of Perak retained authority over Malay religious and cultural affairs. This system was replicated elsewhere, and reinforced through further reforms. The 1957 Constitution enshrined this secular governance in practice. While the constitution avoids explicitly using the word secular, figures at the time such as Tunku Abdul Rahman noted it would lead to a secular federation. The clause establishing Islam as the official religion was explicitly limited to not affecting the rest of the constitution, which included a provision for religious freedom, albeit with controls on Islamic affairs.

As modernisation has increased, it has brought along with it an increase in secularism. In urban areas, the switch to more western dress such as miniskirts and jeans is of concern to religious authorities. Nightclubs and bars thrive in the cities. However, in the time since independence other areas have become more Islamic. At the time of independence women wore tight-fitting outfits, but now wear headscarves. Muslim prayers are played through the speaker systems of government buildings, and some feel Malaysia is becoming a more Islamic than secular state, with critics complaining that Islam is gaining greater influence in governance. The issue of how the Malay identity should be developed has increasingly come under debate. While the ruling government believes that attaining economic power will empower the Malay population, PAS sees that as an erosion of Islamic values. However, PAS is often seen as to not be able to relate Islamic beliefs to modern society, especially in multicultural Malaysia. The constitutional link between Islam and Malay identity has meant the issues of Malay supremacy within the country and the Islamic status of the country have become linked.

Historically, Malaysia was considered secular, with the first prime minister stating "this country is not an Islamic state as it is generally understood." However, political change, especially the desire among UMNO politicians to counter the appeal of PAS, has led to the question of secularity becoming a prominent political issue. Attempts to crack down on what was seen as Islamic extremism led the government to change the penal code to prosecute those who "abuse religious freedom" in the early 1980s. In June 1983, the Mahathir government stated that the administration would be guided by Islamic values, while in August of that year it supported the establishment of the Malaysian Consultative Council of Buddhism, Christianity, Hinduism and Sikhism.

In September 2001 debate was caused by then Prime Minister Mahathir Mohamad's announcement that Malaysia was already an Islamic State. Mahathir sought to convince Islamic voters that UMNO believed in an Islamic state, while also stating non-Muslims could consider Malaysia to be secular. Also in 2001, a high court ruling explicitly contradicted previous rulings, stating that Malaysia was not a strictly secular state and asserting the constitutional status of Islam had broader implications than previously legally understood. In 2007 Prime Minister Abdullah Ahmad Badawi first called Malaysia an Islamic state. Earlier that month he had made another statement, saying Malaysia was neither a theocratic or secular state. A similar statement was made by Prime Minister on 12 March 2009, where he stated Malaysia was a "negara Islam". The Malaysian Chinese Association (MCA), a political group representing Malaysian Chinese people, expressed reservations over this announcement. The MCA's position is that Malaysia is a fully secular state, and that the law transcends religion. The Prime Minister has asserted the continuing debate about secularism has been caused by opposition parties to advance their own political interests. PAS has sought to reinterpret the constitution to officially define the country as an Islamic state.

Many constitutional changes have favoured ethnic Malays and the official Shafi'i interpretation of Sunni Islam. This reflects a political culture that has shifted towards being more accommodating of Malay supremacy and towards a more Islamic society. Governments have reduced the power of civil courts over time, while the power of Sharia courts has expanded, leading to some judicial conflict. Legal changes outside of the constitution, including at state level, also further embedded perceived Islamic values into the civil legal system.

Religious laws are mostly a matter for state and territory governments. These often prevent criticism of state-sponsored Islam, and state religious institutions sometimes speak out against other religions. Such activity varies by state, however. In particular, states governed by PAS have seen laws interpreted in ways that favour the furthering of state-sponsored Islam. When PAS was defeated in Terengganu, enforcement of female dress codes was reduced. The state PAS government in Kelantan bans traditional Malay dance theatres, banned advertisements depicting women who are not fully clothed, and enforced the wearing of headscarves, although they allowed gender segregated cinemas and concerts. Some government-controlled bodies pressure non-Muslims to also wear headscarves, and all students of the International Islamic University of Malaysia and female officers in the Royal Malaysian Police are required to wear headscarves in public ceremonies.

=== Freedom of religion ===
Freedom of religion, despite being guaranteed in the constitution, faces many restrictions in Malaysia. Based on the Malaysian constitution, a Malay in Malaysia must be a Muslim, and Malays cannot convert to another religion. Islamic religious practices are determined by official Sharia law, and Muslims can be fined for not fasting or refusing to pray. Women are increasingly pressured to wear head coverings. Non-Malays are more free to shift between religions. Attempts by Muslims to convert to other religions are punished by state governments, with punishments ranging from fines to imprisonment. The federal government does not intervene in legal disputes over conversion, leaving it to the courts. The secular courts of Malaysia have ruled they do not have the authority to decide these cases, referring them to the Syariah courts. These Islamic courts have unanimously ruled that all ethnic Malays must remain Muslims. Even non-Malays who have converted to Islam are not allowed to leave Islam, and children born to Muslim parents are considered to be Muslims. A non-Muslim who wishes to marry a Muslim must first convert to Islam.

Muslims who have attempted to convert from Islam have received death threats. Those who have converted lead a secret double life. The civil court claims that conversions are under the jurisdiction of the Syariah courts, but converts contend that, as they are no longer Muslim, the Syariah courts hold no power over them. A 1996 fatwa allows only Sunni Islam to be practised. Converts taken for rehabilitation by Islamic authorities are forced to dress and act as Muslims. In at least one case, a professed Hindu, who was listed as a Muslim because her parents were even though she was raised by her grandmother as a Hindu, was forced to eat beef. Only one person is known to have had their conversion from Islam accepted, an 89-year-old Malay woman who converted to Buddhism in 1936 and had her decision accepted after her death in 2006. In 2018, the Chief Minister of the state of Sarawak pledged to amend Sarawak's laws to allow individuals to convert from Islam, following a court case where three women who had converted to Islam after marrying Muslims sought to be registered as Christians again following divorce from their spouse or their spouse's death.

Conflicting views regarding the conversion law have placed the government in a dilemma as academics and politicians intensely debate its relevance whilst causing considerable tension between non-Muslims who oppose the laws with Muslim groups who advocate for its preservation. It is illegal to disseminate any non-Islamic religious material to Muslims. The PAS party wishes that the death penalty be enacted for Muslims who attempt to convert, as part of their ultimate desire to turn Malaysia into an Islamic state.

In recent years, there have been some issues over non-Muslims eating during Muslim fasting month, non-Muslims being allowed to use the word "Allah" to refer to God, and non-Muslim religious sites affected by intolerant Muslim authorities.

The question of whether the Ahmadiyya minority can be considered Muslims has reached the courts.

According to Freedom House, in 2023, the country scored 1 out of 4 for freedom of religion. In the same year, it was ranked as the 43rd worst country in the world to be a Christian.

== Interfaith relations ==
The separate religious communities have a generally tolerant relationship. Festivals are held for all major religions, which are participated in by people from that religion and others in a Malaysian practise known as 'Open House'. Malaysia has a reputation for being a successful multicultural country, with the only two serious occurrences of racial violence in modern history occurring in 1946 and 1969. Other countries have examined Malaysia as an example for handling Islamic fundamentalism.

However, some politicians allege that there is a creeping Islamisation of Malaysian society, and due to the links between race and religion it is thought the economic status of different races causes religious problems. The predominance of Islam and its slow spread into everyday life in Malaysia has caused worry for non-Muslim groups. The Kerling Incident in 1978, where four Muslims died in a series of attacks on Hindu temples, re-ignited fears of racial violence and led to political calls for religious tolerance. A Tamil newspaper was temporarily shut down in 1980 after being accused of insulting Islam. The destruction of Hindu temples by the government for development purposes, and the difficulty of obtaining land and permission for new temples, has raised tensions.

Prime Minister Abdullah Ahmad Badawi in 2004 appeared at a Christian gathering to read from the Bible and called for religious unity despite differences. This was done at a time when Malaysia was head of the Organisation of Islamic Cooperation. In February 2005 the Malaysian Bar Council organised the discussion of an interfaith commission, although several Islamic groups refused to participate claiming the commission would "weaken Islam". Several Muslim groups boycotted and condemned an interfaith council, claiming Islam should only be discussed by Muslims. The government states the commission was not necessary but encourages and promotes interfaith dialogue. Some non-Muslim interfaith organisations do exist, such as the MCCBCHS, the Malaysian Council of Churches, and the Christian Federation of Malaysia.

In 2006 a memorandum was presented to the prime minister by non-Muslim cabinet members asking for a review of constitutional provisions affecting the rights of non-Muslims. After protests by Muslim leaders in the governing coalition, this was withdrawn. It is forbidden for non-Muslims to try to convert Muslims, although Muslims are allowed to convert others. Malay politicians have asked the Chinese and Indian communities not to question Malay rights, for fear of igniting ethnic violence, with harmony between the races and religions being seen as a necessity.

There is a divide within Muslims between those espousing more pluralist views and those seeking a more Islamic society. An increase in political Islam has led to instances of aggression towards non-Muslims, including attacks on churches. Prominent points of tensions include conversion, with converting away from Islam being effectively legally impossible, and language use, with the use of Malay for non-Muslim religious sermons and materials being controversial. Religious tolerance is more apparent in East Malaysia, which has a greater incidence of interfaith marriages and less tension around language use. Muslim communities in Peninsular Malaysia are generally more conservative.

There have been some debates over the attendance of Muslims to events held hosted by non-Islamic religious institutions. Minister in the Prime Minister's Department for Religious Affairs Mohd Na'im Mokhtar proposed guidelines in 2025 that would create requirements for the attendance of Muslims to such events. However, this was opposed by individuals including the Sultan of Selangor Sharafuddin on the grounds that it would disturb religious harmony, and Prime Minister Anwar Ibrahim clarified that it was not official policy.

== Islam ==
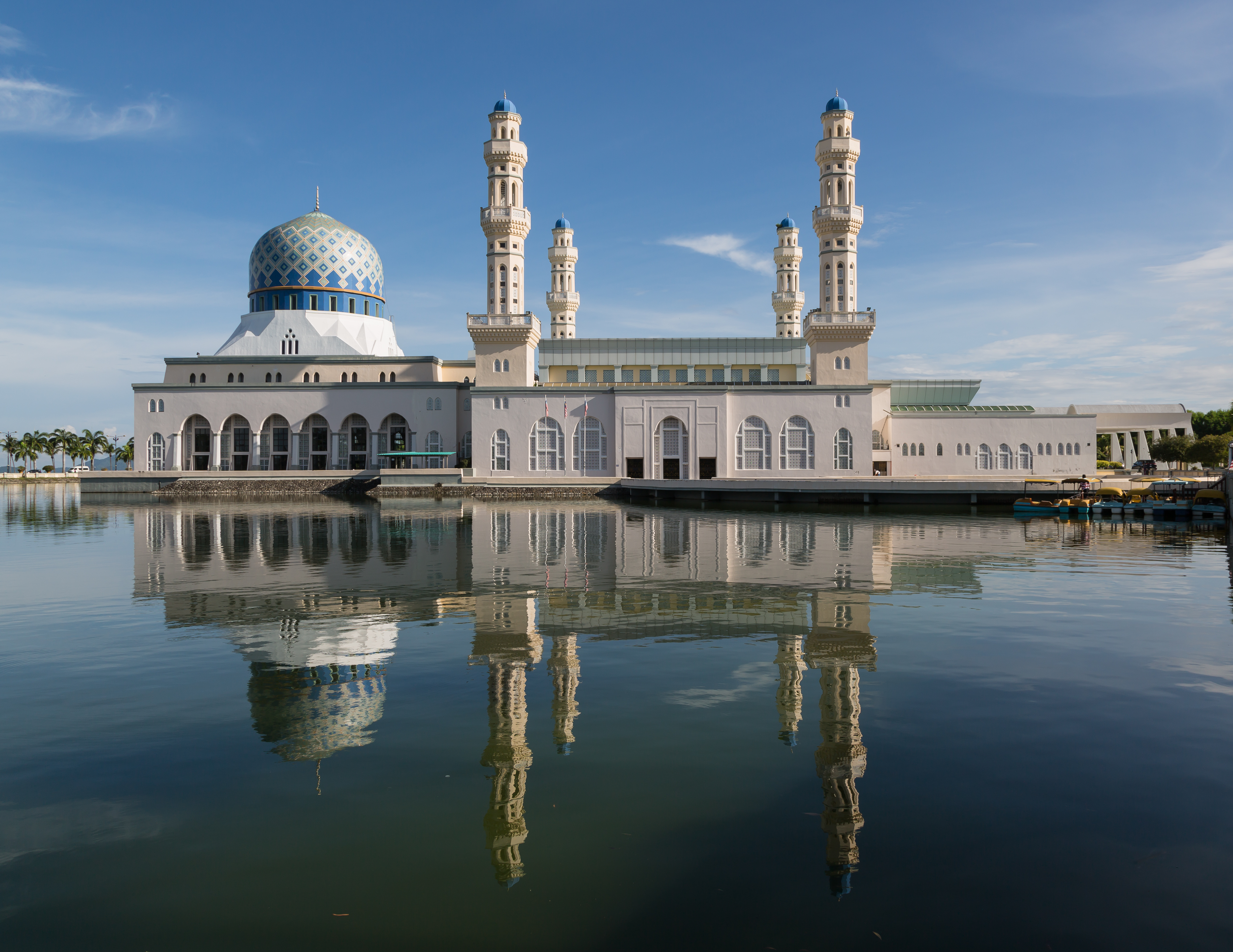
Kota Kinabalu City Mosque in Sabah

Islam is the predominant religion of the country and is recognised as the state's official religion. It is practised by about 63 percent of Malaysians. Many Muslim holy days are national holidays, including the end of Ramadan, the end of the Hajj, and the birthday of Muhammad. Islam is thought to have been brought to Malaysia around the 12th century by Indian traders. In the early 15th century the Malacca Sultanate, commonly considered the first independent state in the peninsula, was founded. Led by a Muslim prince the influence of Malacca led to the spread of Islam throughout the Malay population.

Although most people in Malaya were Muslim by the 15th century, the tolerant form of Islam brought by the Sufi meant that many traditional practices were incorporated into Islamic traditions. Islam is generally practised liberally, although in the last 20 years strict adherence to Islamic practice has increased. The official code of Islam in Malaysia is Sunni, and the practice of any other form of Islam is heavily restricted. The government opposes what it calls "deviant" teachings, forcing those who are deemed to follow these teachings to undergo "rehabilitation". In June 2006, 56 deviant teachings had been identified by national authorities, including Shi'a, transcendental meditation, and Baháʼí Faith. teachings. In June 2005 religious authorities reported that there were 22 "deviant" religious groups with around 2,820 followers in Malaysia. No statistics are given on rehabilitations, and the government actively monitors Shi'a groups. Restrictions have been imposed on Imams coming from overseas.

The Malaysian government promotes a moderate version of Sunni Islam called Islam Hadhari. Islam Hadhari was introduced by former Prime Minister Abdullah Ahmad Badawi. It is meant to encourage a balanced approach to life and encourages inclusivity, tolerance, and looking outwards. The qualities it values are knowledge, hard work, honesty, good administration, and efficiency. The Islamic party PAS desires a stricter interpretation of Islam and the promotion of Islamic law. Due to Islam being the state religion, many mosques and other religious services are supported by the government. Control of the mosques is usually done on a state rather than a federal level. The charitable Zakāt tax is collected by the government, and the government supports those wishing to make the pilgrimage to Mecca. In 1985, Kassim Ahmed wrote a book called Hadith: A Re-evaluation which promoted Quranism, but it was subsequently banned by the Malaysian government.

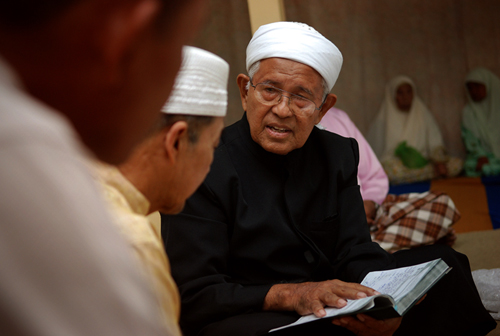
An Ustaz reading during a Malay wedding

Per Article 160 of the Constitution of Malaysia one must be Muslim to be considered Malay. In practice, Muslims have a lot of difficulty in legally converting to another religion due to the Shari'a courts denying conversion claims, and if a Malay did convert they would lose their status as bumiputera. People of non-Muslim origins are required to convert to Islam if they marry a Muslim person. Public schools are required to offer Islamic religious instruction, although alternative ethics classes are provided for non-Muslims. Many women wear the tudong, which covers the head but leaves the face exposed, although there is no law requiring this. Islamic police monitor the Muslim population. Regulation of sexual activities among the Muslim population is strict, with laws prohibiting unmarried couples from occupying a secluded area or a confined space, to prevent suspicion of acts considered islamically immoral.

Muslims are obliged to follow the decisions of Syariah courts in matters concerning their religion. The Islamic judges are expected to follow the Shafi`i legal school of Islam, which is the main madh'hab of Malaysia. These courts apply Sharia law. The jurisdiction of Shariah courts is limited only to Muslims in matters such as marriage, inheritance, divorce, apostasy, religious conversion, and custody among others. No other criminal or civil offences are under the jurisdiction of the Shariah courts, which have a similar hierarchy to the civil courts. Despite being the supreme courts of the land, the Civil Courts (including the Federal Court) do not hear matters related to Islamic practices. Cases concerning a Muslim and a non-Muslim are usually handled by the civil courts, although in cases such as child custody or property settlement the non-Muslim has no say.

In 2009 the National Fatwa Committee decided female circumcision was part of Malaysian Islamic practice, making it obligatory unless determined to be harmful to the individual.

== Minority religions ==
=== Buddhism and Chinese religions ===
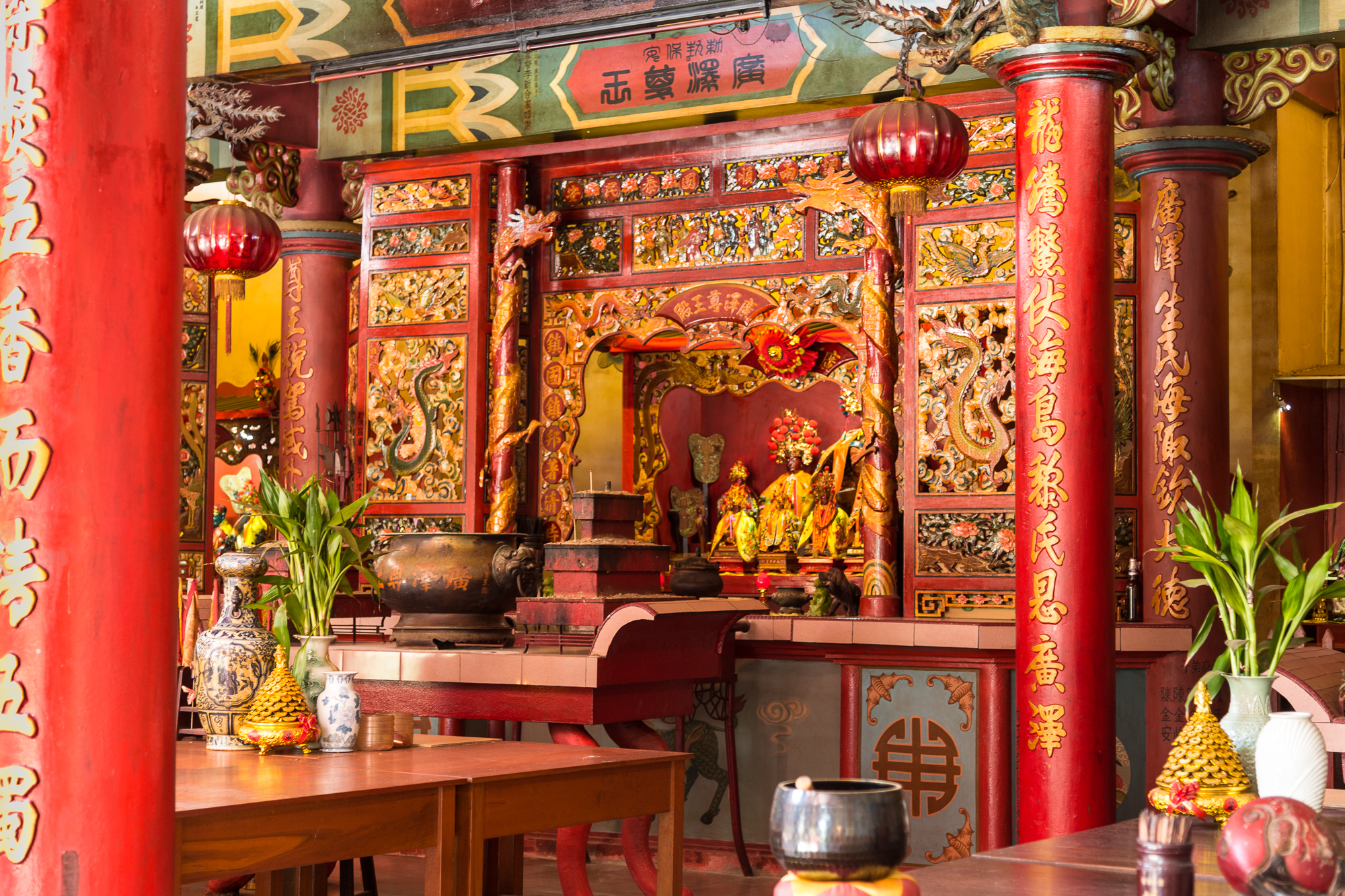
Inner hall of Ling San Temple, a temple of the Chinese folk religion in Tuaran, Sabah

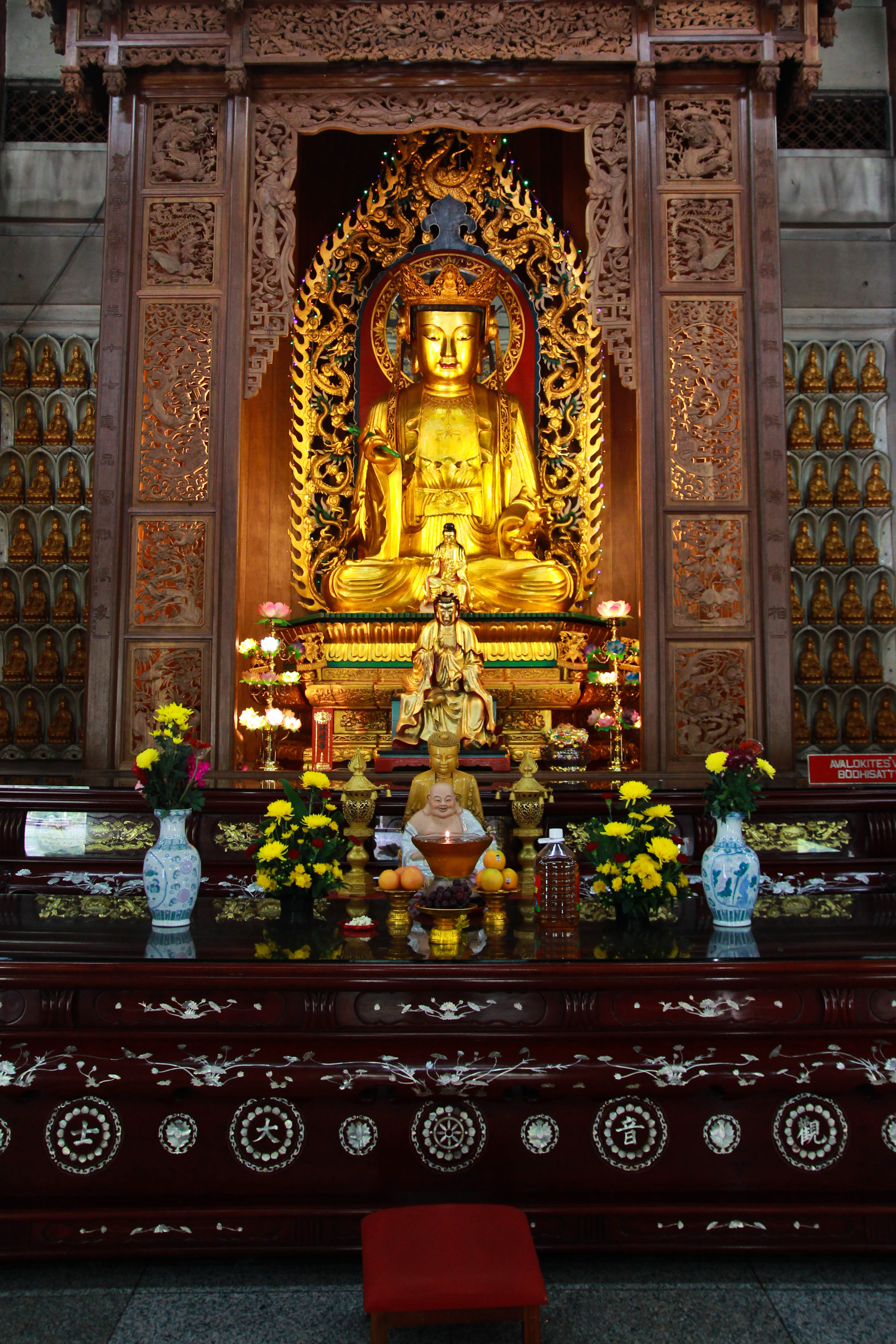
Statue of Guanyin in Kek Lok Si Temple, Penang

Archaeological evidence, as well as official Chinese imperial records and Indian sources, confirm the existence of several Hindu-Buddhist kingdoms in Malaysia from the 3rd to 13th century CE. The earliest of these Indianized kingdoms was probably Kedah-Langkasuka in northern Malay Peninsula.

Kedah, lying half-way between China and the Middle-east, was an important entréport in the "Maritime Silk-route". The foundations of ancient stupas have been uncovered in Sungai Mas. The famous Chinese traveler-monk, Yi Jing, stopped over there on his sea voyage to Nalanda, India in 671 CE. Kedah later became a vassal of Srivijaya from the 7th to 11th century CE. The Maharajas of Srivijaya were Buddhists, and they were responsible for building many of the monuments in Sumatra, Peninsular Malaysia, and Java, including the famous Candi Borobudur in Central Java) and Muaro Jambi Temple Compounds in Sumatra.

In 607 CE, a Chinese embassy of the Sui dynasty recorded the presence of the Buddhist kingdom of Che-tu (literally, "red-earth"). Located in the interiors of modern-day Kelantan, the kingdom supplied gold and jungle produce to Langkasuka and Champa (Southern Vietnam). Terracotta figurines of Buddhas and Bodhisattvas from the Mahayana School were found in the districts of Tanah Merah and Gua Musang in Kelantan.

Most Malaysian Chinese practice a syncretic blend of various faiths, including Buddhism, Confucianism, Taoism, and the Chinese folk religions, including Datuk Keramat cult. Although Buddhism was influential prior to the arrival of Islam, the majority of the current Chinese population arrived during British rule of Malaya. Chinese New Year is celebrated as a national holiday. For many Chinese, religion is an essential part of their cultural life.

Buddhism is currently the second largest religious denomination in Malaysia after Islam. There are approximately 5.4 million Buddhist adherents in the country, comprising 19.2% of the population of 28.3 million (January 2011 estimates). The majority of them are ethnic Chinese who follow the branches of Mahayana Chinese Buddhism, including Chan Buddhism, Pure Land, the local reformist Right Faith (Zheng Xin) Movement, and some Taiwanese modernist organizations, like Tzu Chi. There are also Chinese adherents non-Mahayanic denominations of Buddhism, although there are no exact figures indicating the number of adherents to each tradition.

Theravada Buddhists include ethnic Chinese, Siamese (or Thais), and smaller numbers of Burmese, Sinhalese and Indians. The many ethnic groups of Theravadins usually establish temples in the style of their own traditions, and catering mainly to their own indigenous groups. The Thai community for example establish 'Wats' or Thai Buddhist temples like Wat Chetawan, have resident Thai monks, and conduct their religious services in Pāli and Thai languages. The Sinhalese (Sri Lankan Buddhists) migrated to then Malaya a century ago when both Malaya and Ceylon were under British colonial rule. They brought with them Sinhalese Buddhism with its unique traditions that survive to this day in a few Sri Lankan Viharas (temples) dotting the country and the most prominent one is Buddhist Maha Vihara in Kuala Lumpur.

Most Mahayana Buddhist temples in Malaysia adopt the classical 'Chinese temple' architectural style. The Mahayana Buddhists conduct their services in Mandarin and in various other Chinese dialects, although some urban-area temples have been preaching in English. The practice among the majority ethnic Chinese who profess themselves as Buddhists is actually a syncretic combination of Buddhism and Chinese beliefs and traditions.

Wesak Day was officially declared a public holiday in 1962 throughout the newly independent Federation of Malaya. A Malaysian Buddhist Council has been created to promote the study and practice of Buddhism and promote solidarity among Malaysian Buddhists.

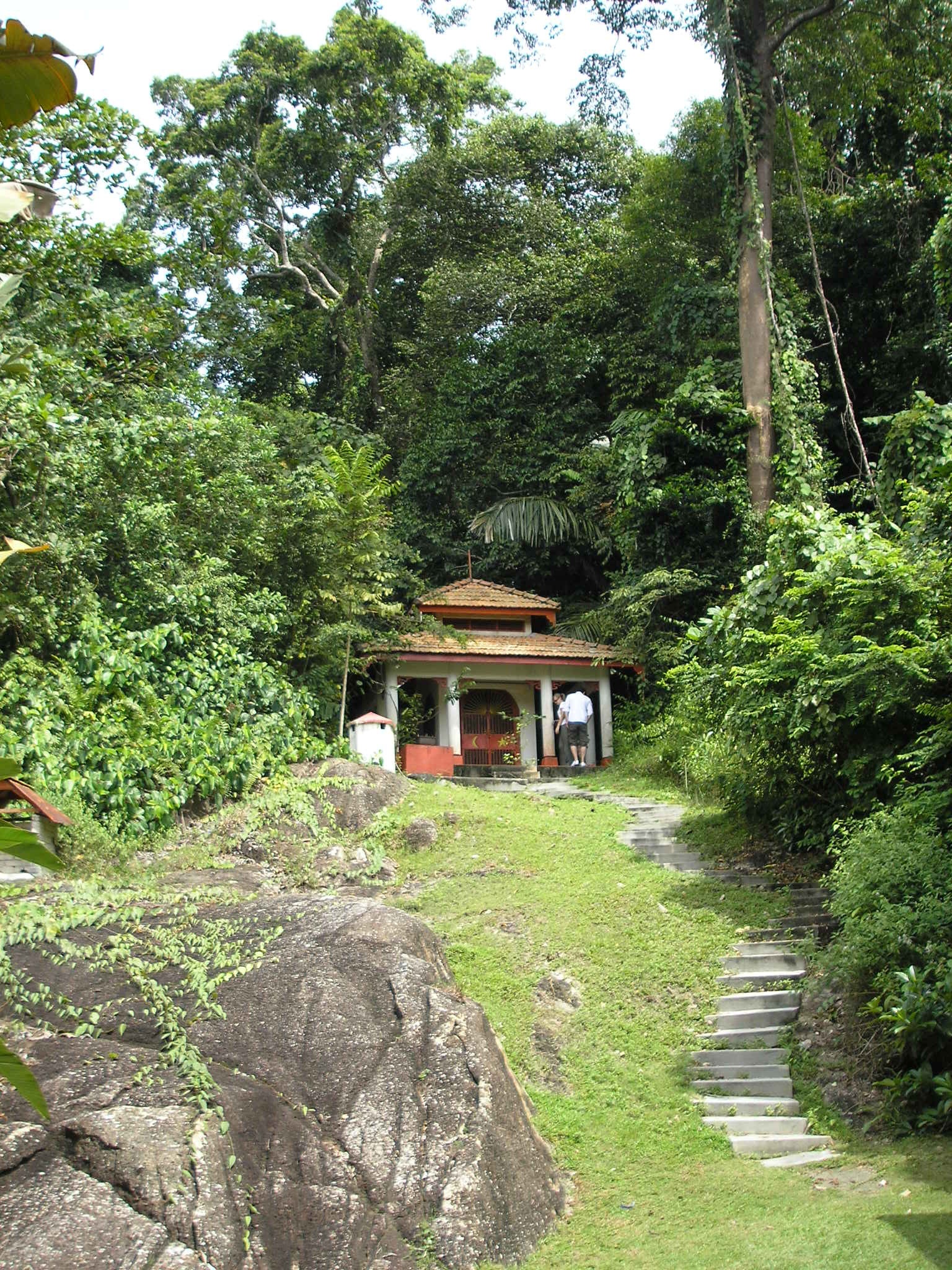
A Keramat shrine on Pangkor Island

It is uncommon for any Malaysian Chinese to be an absolute follower of a particular belief. Many nominally claim membership in a certain belief, yet respect beliefs from multiple religions into their lives. The Chinese traditional religion has become a strong influence in life, and new sects have arisen trying to integrate different religious teachings. Beliefs in Malaysia have also often adopted influence from local animism.

Chinese temples mostly enshrine deities from the Chinese provinces of Guangdong and Fujian. Malaysia has over 150 Taoist temples served by 12,000 priests, with the Taoist communities sharing links with those in Taiwan and Mainland China. Although the religion is not as organised as others, a Malaysia Taoist Association was formed in 1995 and a Taoist Organisation League was formed in 1997.

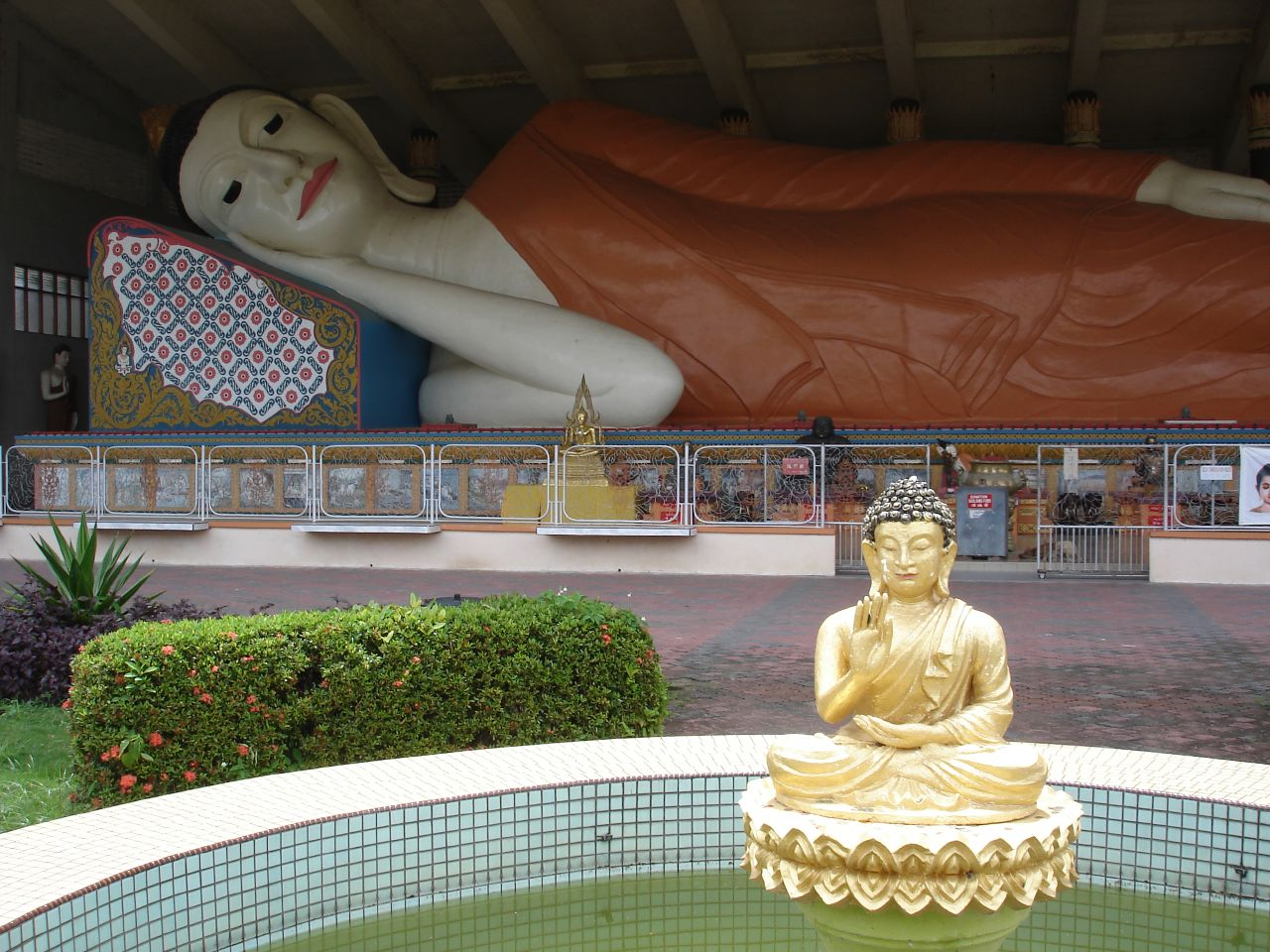
Reclining Buddha in Wat Photivihan, Kelantan

A Chinese sub-group known as the Hui people practice Islam yet retain Chinese culture and have unique traditions. They have Chinese and Central Asian ancestries. Communities existed in Singapore, Pangkor Island, and Sitiawan before the Second World War. The last established community, in Penang, was dispersed when they were evicted from their homes due to development projects. They now mainly live in Gombak, Selangor.

In 2013, a video of a group of Buddhist practitioners from Singapore conducting religious ceremonies in a surau had become viral on Facebook. Malaysian police have arrested a resort owner after he allowed 13 Buddhists to use a Muslim prayer room (surau) for their meditation at Kota Tinggi, Johor. The incident has been frowned upon Muslims in Malaysia. It has also become a hot topic in the social media. Following up at 28 August 2013, the controversial prayer room was demolished by the resort management within 21 days from the date of receipt of the notice after much protests by the residents of Kota Tinggi. At the time, Syed Ahmad Salim, the resort owner explained that he had allowed the group of Buddhists to use the surau for a meditation session as he was unaware that it was an offence.

=== Christianity ===
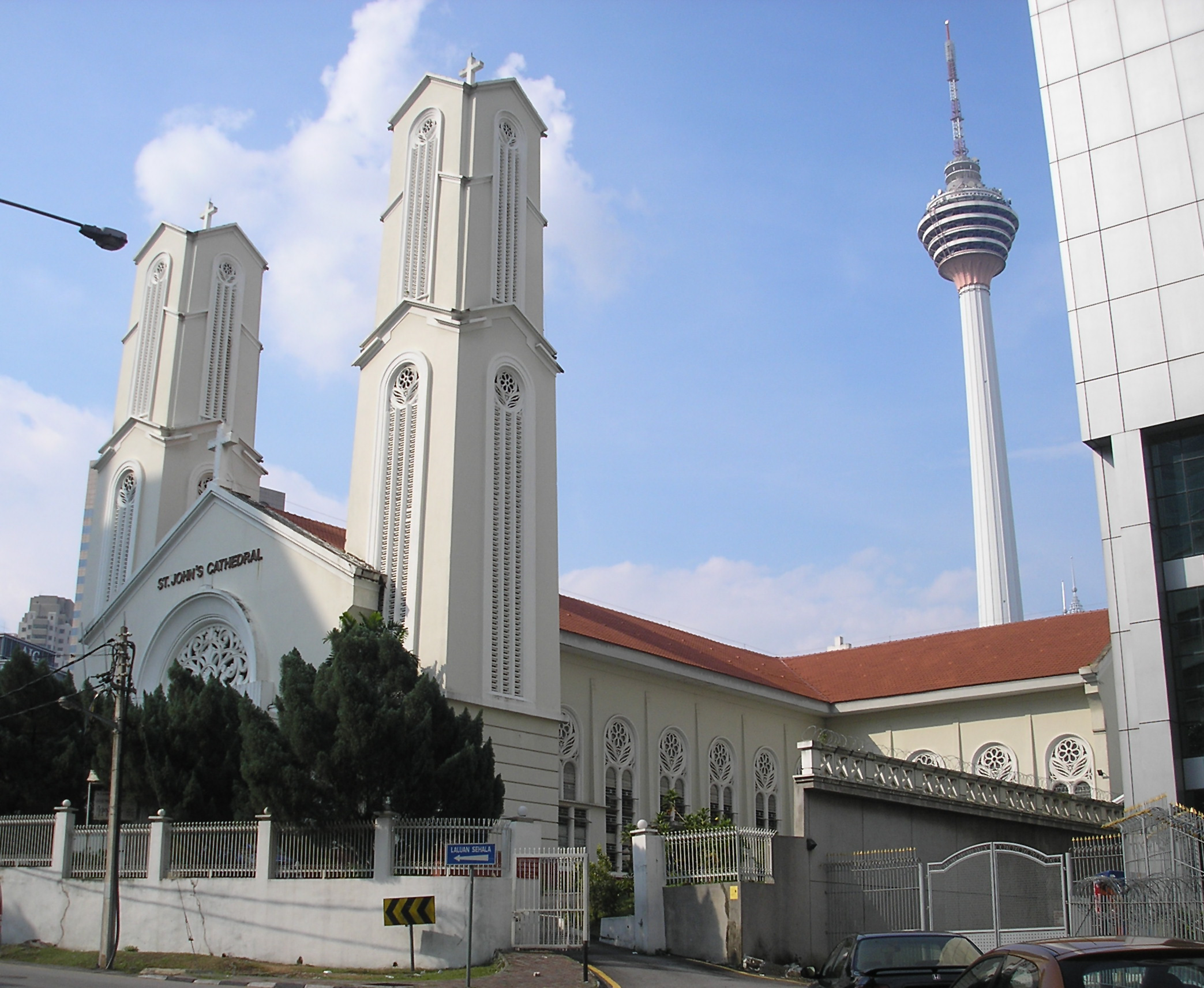
St. John's Cathedral in Kuala Lumpur

In 2022, about 9% of the population of Malaysia were Christians, mostly non-Malay Bumiputera, also including some Malaysian Chinese and Malaysian Indian minorities. About half of Malaysian Christians are Catholic. Most Christians are found in East Malaysia, where Good Friday is a public holiday in the states of Sabah and Sarawak. Christmas is a national holiday, although Easter is not.

Traders with links to Christianity from the Middle East arrived in what is now Malaysia in the 7th century. Catholicism was brought by the Portuguese in the 15th century, followed by Protestantism with the Dutch in 1641. As Portuguese influence declined Protestantism began to eclipse Catholicism. Christianity spread further through missionaries who arrived during British rule in the 19th century and introduced Christianity to East Malaysia. Initial conversions focused mainly on the Straits Settlements. When missionaries began to spread through the peninsula, they were discouraged from converting Malays, focusing on Chinese and Indian immigrants.

Christianity has become restricted as Malaysia has become more Islamic. Restrictions have been placed on the construction of new churches, although existing ones are allowed to operate. The city of Shah Alam has not allowed any churches to be built. Christians are not allowed to attempt the conversion of Muslims and their literature must have a note saying it is for non-Muslims only. Similarly, the film The Passion of the Christ was restricted only to Christian viewers. In April 2005 two Christians were arrested for distributing Christian material in front of a mosque, although charges were later dropped. The restrictions of the dissemination of Malay-language Christian material is much less strict in East Malaysia than in the west. Good Friday is also an official holiday in East Malaysia, although not a national one.

The use of the Malay word "Allah" for God has caused a dispute in Malaysia, with Malay language Bibles banned due to the use of this word, and a government policy was established in 1986 forbidding the use of a small number of words by Christians, including "Allah". It was argued that as the Bibles could be used to spread religions other than Islam, they were against the constitution. Other ministers opposed this discrimination. In 2005 Mohamed Nazri Abdul Aziz tried to enforce this, although some of his ministers argued the national language could be used for any purpose. In 2009 a court ruled that Allah could be used by the Catholic Herald; however, this was overturned in 2013. The ban was not applied to East Malaysia due to the relative autonomy of the states there, a position confirmed by the Malaysian government in 2011. The Bible in the indigenous Iban language was allowed, as that language has no alternate word besides "Allah" for God. In March 2021 the Kuala Lumpur high court overturned the 1986 ban, a ruling which was quickly appealed by the government following religious and political pressure.

=== Hinduism ===
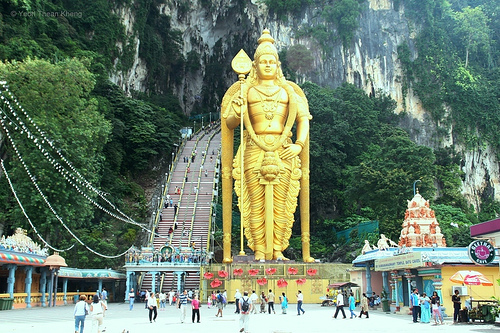
The Batu Caves have the tallest Lord Murugan statue in the world.

The majority of the Tamils who make up 9% of Malaysia's population practice Hinduism. Hinduism was influential prior to Islam, but current adherents are mostly descended from migrant communities from Tamil Nadu who came to Malaya to work on British rubber plantations. A small community of migrants from North India also exists.

Urban temples are often dedicated to a single deity, while rural temples are often home to many different deities. Most were brought with immigrants. Most temples follow the Saivite tradition from Southern India, for the worship of Shiva. The Hindu holiday of Thaipusam and Deepavali is a national holiday. This shift to multi-deity temples occurred beginning in the 1980s, often alongside the rebuilding and expansion of existing temples. More complex worship rituals were developed to accommodate this shift. At the same time, there was a revival of more dedicated religious practice, with greater adherence to traditional practices and the phasing out of practices such as animal sacrifice. Interest in Tamil grew as a way to access religious texts that were not available in English.

Practice of the Hindu religion is strongly linked with the cultural identity of Malaysian Indians. Those who convert to another religion may be ostracised by their family and the Indian community. Some gurus have emerged within the country, and have pushed for greater celebration of Hindu festivals and a rejection of caste-based discrimination.

There is growing anger in the Hindu community over what they believe is a government-backed drive to demolish Hindu temples under the guise that they are illegal structures. The Hindu Rights Action Force, a coalition of 50 Hindu-based NGOs, has accused the government of an unofficial policy of "temple cleansing", with much of the demolition focused around the capital city, Kuala Lumpur. An Indian minister in the cabinet even threatened to boycott Deepavali in response to these demolitions.

== Indigenous religions ==
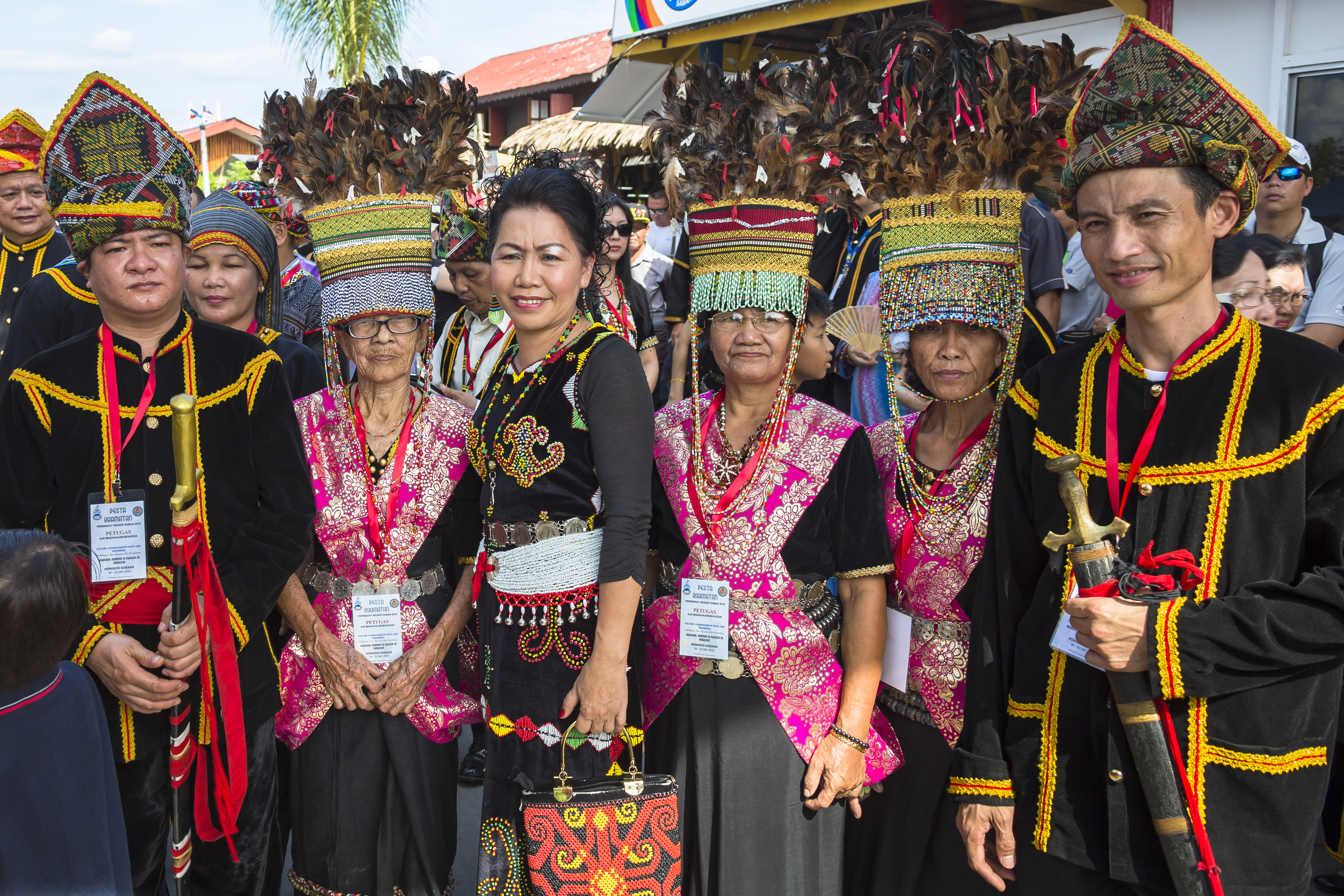
Sabahan preasts and preastesses

Indigenous religions are still practised by the orang Asal people. Loosely classified as animism, the traditional Sabahan and other beliefs are not recognised by the state as a religion. Animistic beliefs are passed down through oral tradition due to the lack of a writing system in indigenous groups, who call their beliefs agama adat (traditional or customary religions). The different religions are rather varied, with different names and concepts for their supreme god and other supernatural deities. Most of the beliefs are heavily influenced by the environment, with physical features such as mountains, trees, valleys, and rivers being sacred. A close relationship with nature is nurtured, and the relationship of humans and nature is a strong part of the religion, with everyday activities such as hunting and gathering having spiritual significance.

== Other religions ==
There is the Ahmadiyya minority, approximately 2,000 Ahmadis in the country. Though small in number, they face state sanctioned persecution in Malaysia, as they do elsewhere in the Muslim world. But the question of whether the Ahmadiyya can be considered Muslims has reached the courts.

A small Sikh community exists in Malaysia, brought by the British to form police units. But, it is largest Sikh diaspora in Asia. They follow Sikhism, and open their places of worship to all races, ages, and genders. No Sikh holiday has been declared a national holiday, although there are 120,000 in the country. Sikhs have, like Christians, come under pressure not to use the word "Allah" for God in their religious texts.

A small Jewish community existed on the island of Penang. Jews first came into contact with the Malay peninsula during the 11th century when Jewish traders traded with the Kedah Sultanate and Langkasuka. Many Jews in Malaysia came from Persia. After the communist revolution in China, more Jews fled to Southeast Asia. However, the Jewish community declined, with many emigrating to countries such as Australia. Due to not having enough members to hold some Jewish rituals, the only synagogue in Penang, established in 1932, was shut down in 1976. The last burial in Penang's Jewish cemetery took place in 1978. By the 1990s the community had disappeared, and it is now thought that there are only two Jews who hold Malaysian passports.

A small Baháʼí Faith community exists in Malaysia, with members from Chinese, Eurasian, Indian, Indigenous communities. It was introduced to Malaya by an Iranian couple in 1950, with the first National Spiritual Assembly being elected in 1964. However, the Department of Islamic Development Malaysia later clarified that Baháʼí Faith was erroneously declared a deviant offshoot of Islam by one of the state religious authorities as the 14th Muzakarah (Conference) of the Fatwa Committee of the National Council for Islamic Religious Affairs Malaysia held on 22–23 October 1985 decided that the Baháʼí doctrine is not part of Islam and the religion is recognised by the Registration Department and national census as an independent religion.

A community of around 2500 Jains lives in Malaysia, with the state capital of Perak, Ipoh, hosting the only Jain temple in Southeast Asia. Most are Gujaratis, who are thought to have arrived in Malacca in the 15th or 16th century.

Among the new religious movements introduced in Malaysia are the locally-originating Sky Kingdom and the foreign Falun Gong and Transcendental Meditation movement.

== Bibliography ==
The following list of selected printed bibliographies on the topic includes both cited works and further reading.

- Abdullah, Kamarulnizam (2020). "Political Islam and Democracy in Malaysia". In Verma, Vidhu; Rathore, Aakash Singh (eds.). Secularism, Religion, and Democracy in Southeast Asia. Oxford: Oxford University Press. pp. 88–110. ISBN 978-0-19-909877-4.
- Ali, Muhamad (2016). Islam and Colonialism: Becoming Modern in Indonesia and Malaya. Edinburgh: Edinburgh University Press. ISBN 978-1-4744-0920-9.
- Ashaari, Muhamad Faisal; Sabri, Siti Hanisah (December 2018). "Perbincangan Berkaitan Agama dan Ketuhanan dalam Facebook "Warung Atheist" dari Perspektif Logik dan Emosi" [Discussions Related to Religion and Divinity in Facebook "Warung Atheist" from a Logical and Emotional Perspective]. Journal of Islamic Social Sciences and Humanities (in Malay). 15 (1). doi:10.33102/abqari.vol15no1.28.
- Baharuddin, Azizan; Zaid, Ahmad; et al. (2014). Kajian Isi dan Cabaran Hubungan antara Penganut Agama di Malaysia [A Study of the Content and Challenges of Relationships between Religious Adherents in Malaysia] (in Malay). Institut Kefahaman Islam Malaysia; Universiti Putra Malaysia. Kuala Lumpur.
- Berinai, Judy (2013). Liturgical inculturation in Anglican worship in light of the spirituality of the indigenous people of Sabah, Malaysia. Oxford: Oxford Centre for Mission Studies.
- Burgess, Stanley M.; Maas, Eduard M. van der, eds. (2002). "Malaysia". The New International Dictionary of Pentecostal and Charismatic Movements (Rev. and exp. ed.). Grand Rapids, Mi: Zondervan. pp. 170–73. ISBN 978-0-310-22481-5.
- Cheu, Hock Tong (1996). Malay Keramat, Chinese Worshippers: The Sinicization of Malay Keramats in Malaysia (PDF). Singapore: Dept. of Malay Studies, National University of Singapore. ISBN 981-00-8755-1.
- Cheu, Hock Tong (1999). Chinese Beliefs and Practices in Southeast Asia: Studies on the Chinese Religion in Malaysia, Singapore and Indonesia. Singapore: Pelanduk Publications. ISBN 978-9679784527.
- Chia, Jack Meng-Tat (2020). Monks in Motion: Buddhism and Modernity Across the South China Sea. Oxford; New York: Oxford University Press. ISBN 9780197613672.
- Chin, Mun Yee; Lee, Yok Fee (2014). "Settling Down Spiritually: Chinese Malaysian's Worship of Datuk Gong" (PDF). Pertanika. 22 (1). Universiti Putra Malaysia: 379–392.
- Clammer, John R., ed. (1983). Studies in Chinese Folk Religion in Singapore and Malaysia. Singapore: Dept. of Sociology, National University of Singapore.
- Esposito, John L., ed. (1995). "Malaysia". The Oxford Encyclopedia of the Modern Islamic World: 4-volume Set. Vol. 3. New York; Oxford: Oxford University Press. ISBN 0-19-509614-2.
- Freedman, Amy L. (2020). "Religious Minorities in Southeast Asia: The Ahmadiyah and Why Tolerance Matters". In Verma, Vidhu; Rathore, Aakash Singh (eds.). Secularism, Religion, and Democracy in Southeast Asia. Oxford: Oxford University Press. pp. 135–160. ISBN 978-0-19-909877-4.
- Gidah, Mary Ellen (2001). Archetypes in the Cosmogonic Myths of the Australian Aboriginal People and the Kadazandusuns of Sabah. Kota Kinabalu: Penerbit Universiti Malaysia Sabah.
- Gill, Savinder Kaur; Gopal, Nirmala Devi (2010). "Understanding Indian Religious Practice in Malaysia" (PDF). Journal of Social Science. 25 (3): 135–146.
- Goh, Robbie B. H. (2005). "Chap. 4. Malaysia". Christianity in Southeast Asia. Singapore: ISEAS: Institute of Southeast Asian Studies Publications. pp. 47–56. ISBN 9812302972.
- Hamid, Ahmad Fauzi Abdul; Ibrahim, Zawawi (2017). "The Governance of Religious Diversity in Malaysia: Islam in a Secular State or Secularism in an Islamic State?". In Triandafyllidou, Anna; Modood, Tariq (eds.). The Problem of Religious Diversity: European Challenges, Asian Approaches. Edinburgh: Edinburgh University Press. ISBN 978-1-4744-3529-1.
- Hamid, Ahmad Fauzi Abdul; Johari, Zairil Khir (2020). "Secularism and Ethno-religious Nationalist Hegemony in Malaysia". In Verma, Vidhu; Rathore, Aakash Singh (eds.). Secularism, Religion, and Democracy in Southeast Asia. Oxford: Oxford University Press. pp. 213–249. ISBN 978-0-19-909877-4.
- Hassan, M. Kamal; Basri, Ghazali bin, eds. (2005). The Encyclopedia of Malaysia. Vol. 10: Religions and Beliefs. Singapore: Editions Didier Millet. ISBN 981-3018-51-8. Archived from the original on 11 August 2011.
- Helmiati (2007). Islam dalam Masyarakat dan Politik Malaysia [Islam in Malaysian Society and Politics] (PDF) (in Malay). Pekanbaru: Suska Press. ISBN 978-979-1288-11-8.
- Hooker, Virginia Matheson; Othman, Norani, eds. (2003). Malaysia: Islam, Society and Politics. ISEAS Series on Islam. Singapore: Institute of Southeast Asian Studies (ISEAS). ISBN 981-230-161-5.
- Kahlon, Swarn Singh (2016). "Chapter 3. Sikhs in Malaysia: Largest Sikh Population in Asia". Sikhs in Asia Pacific: Travels among the Sikh Diaspora from Yangon to Kobe (PDF). New Delhi: Manohar Publisher. ISBN 978-9350981207.
- Kamali, Mohammad Hashim (2000). Islamic Law in Malaysia: Issues and Developments. Kuala Lumpur: Ilmiah Publishers. ISBN 983-2092-27-2.
- Kuhnt-Saptodewo, Sri; Grabowsky, Volker; Großheim, Martin, eds. (1997). Nationalism and Cultural Revival in Southeast Asia: Perspectives from the Centre and Region. Wiesbaden: Harrassowitz Verlag. ISBN 3-447-03958-2.
- Lazarus, Esterlina Moo Chin Len; Rahman, Mohd Kipli Abdul (2022). "Magahau Rungus: Dari Upacara Ritual Ke Pesta Keramaian" [Magahau Rungus: From Ritual Ceremonies To Pesta Keramaian]. Jurnal Gendang Alam (in Malay). 12 (2). Universiti Malaysia Sabah. doi:10.51200/ga.v12i2.3975.
- Lee, Raymod L. M. (April 1988). "Patterns of Religious Tension in Malaysia". Asian Survey. 28 (4): 400–418. doi:10.1525/as.1988.28.4.01p0154q. JSTOR 2644735.
- Lee, Raymond L. M.; Ackerman, Susan Ellen (1997). Sacred Tensions: Modernity and Religious Transformation in Malaysia. Columbia, SC: University of South Carolina Press. ISBN 978-1-57003-167-0.
- Low, Kok On; Lee, Yok Fee (2012). "Investigating the Relationship between Kadazandusun Beliefs about Paddy Spirits, Riddling in Harvest-time and Paddy-Related Sundait" (PDF). Malim: Jurnal Pengajian Umum Asia Tenggara. 13 (Julai): 71–97.
- Mandryk, Jason (2010). "Malaysia". Operation World: The Definitive Prayer Guide to Every Nation (7th rev. ed.). Downers Grove, Il: InterVarsity Press. ISBN 978-0-8308-5724-1.
- Martinez, Patricia A. (December 2001). "The Islamic State or the State of Islam in Malaysia". Contemporary Southeast Asia. 23 (3): 474–503. doi:10.1355/CS23-3E (inactive 1 July 2025). Archived from the original on 18 December 2009 – via Questia.
- McDougall, Colin (1956). Buddhism in Malaya. Singapore: Donald Moore.
- Melton, J. Gordon; Baumann, Martin, eds. (2010). "Malaysia". Religions of the world: a comprehensive encyclopedia of beliefs and practices. Vol. 5 (2nd ed.). Santa Barbara, Ca; Denver; Oxford: ABC-Clio. ISBN 978-1-59884-203-6.
- Metcalf, Peter (1987). "Bornean Religion". In Eliade, Mircea (ed.). The Encyclopedia of Religion. Vol. 2. New York: MacMillan. pp. 290–292. ISBN 0029094801.
- Moustafa, Tamir (2018). Constituting Religion: Islam, Liberal Rights, and the Malaysian State. Cambridge: Cambridge University Press. ISBN 978-110-853-929-6.
- Osman, Mohd Taib (1989). Malay Folk Beliefs: An Integration of Disparate Elements. Kuala Lumpur: Dewan Bahasa dan Pustaka (Language and Library Board).
- Peletz, Michael G. (2002). Islamic Modern: Religious Courts and Cultural Politics in Malaysia. Princeton, NJ: Princeton University Press. ISBN 0-691-09508-6.
- Piyasilo (1988). Buddhist Culture: An Observation of the Buddhist Situation in Malaysia and Singapore and a Suggestion. Petaling Jaya, Selangor: The Friends of Buddhism Malaysia.
- Putten, Jan van der; Cody, Mary Kilcline, eds. (2009). Lost Times and Untold Tales from the Malay World. Singapore: NUS Press. ISBN 978-9971-69-454-8.
- Ramanathan, K. (1996). "Hinduism in a Muslim State: The Case of Malaysia". Asian Journal of Political Science. 4 (2): 42–62. doi:10.1080/02185379608434083.
- Riddel, Peter G. (2001). Islam and the Malay-Indonesian World: Transmission and Responses. Honolulu: University of Hawai'i Press. ISBN 0-8248-2473-3.
- Rutter, Owen (1929). The Pagans of North Borneo. London: Hutchinson & Co.
- Saeed, Abdullah; Saeed, Hassan (2004). "Chapters 9–12". Freedom of Religion, Apostasy and Islam. Aldershot, Eng: Ashgate Publishing. pp. 123–166. ISBN 0-7546-3082-X.
- Saran, Syam, ed. (2018). Cultural and Civilisational Links between India and Southeast Asia: Historical and Contemporary Dimensions. Singapore: Palgrave McMillan. ISBN 978-981-10-7316-8.
- Shah, Dian A. H. (2017). Constitutions, Religion and Politics in Asia: Indonesia, Malaysia and Sri Lanka. Cambridge: Cambridge University Press. ISBN 978-1-107-18334-6.
- Sofjan, Dicky, ed. (2013). Sejarah & Budaya Syiah di Asia Tenggara [Shia's History and Culture in Southeast Asia] (PDF) (in Indonesian). Yogyakarta: Penerbit Sekolah Pascasarjana Universitas Gadjah Mada. ISBN 978-979-25-0118-6.
- Tan, Chee-Beng (1983). "Chinese Religion in Malaysia: A General View". Asian Folklore Studies. 42. JSTOR 1178483.
- Tan, Chee-Beng (1988). The Baba of Melaka. Selangor: Pelanduk Publications.
- Tan, Lee Ooi (2020). Buddhist Revitalization and Chinese Religions in Malaysia. Religion and society in Asia. Amsterdam: Amsterdam University Press. ISBN 9789463726436. OCLC 1142763113.
- Tjandra, Lukas (1990). Folk religion among the Chinese in Singapore and Malaysia. Ann Arbour, Mi: University Microfilms International.
- Weiyi, Lin 林緯毅 (Ning Ngoi Ngi), ed. (2010). Bie qi wei zong: Dongnanya de ruxue yu kongjiao 別起為宗: 東南亞的儒學與孔教 [Establishing a Separate Branch of Transmission: Confucian Learning and the Confucian Religious Sect in Southeast Asia] (in Chinese). Singapore: Singapore Society of Asian Studies.
- Winzeler, Robert L., ed. (1993). The Seen and the Unseen: Shamanism, Mediumship and Possession in Borneo. Williamsburg, Va: Borneo Research Council. ISBN 978-0962956812.
- Yen, Ching-Hwang (1976). "The Confucian Revival Movement in Singapore and Malaya, 1899–1911". Journal of Southeast Asian Studies. 7 (3): 33–57. doi:10.1017/S0022463400010250. JSTOR 20070162.
