= Irreligion in Malaysia =

Malaysia, a primarily Muslim country located in peninsular and insular regions of Southeast Asia, has a government influenced by Islamic law, which has expressed anti-heretical and anti-atheist views. Notably, in 2017, Minister in the Prime Minister's Department Shahidan Kassim faced backlash for threatening to "hunt down" atheists in response to a meeting of members of Atheist Republic.

== Demographics ==
Based on the 2010 government census, it is estimated that there are no more than 300,000 irreligious people among Malaysia's 30 million population. In the census, 97.9% of the population named Islam, Buddhism, Christianity, Hinduism, and traditional Chinese religions as their faith, with the remaining 2.1% composed of irreligious Malaysians and Sikhs (around 350,000). The remainder may include atheists, animists, practitioners of folk religion, and other belief systems. However, it is possible that there are more irreligious people in reality, and that these low numbers may be caused by bias among census authorities or fear of disapproval toward participants.

== Official status ==
Blasphemy, or the act of insulting any religion, is a crime in Malaysia, but atheism is not. Apostasy is also not a federal crime, however, the nation's state-level shariah courts do not typically allow Muslims to officially leave the religion, and they can receive counseling, fines, or jail time. Ethnic Malays are also legally required to identify as Muslim, and Shariah laws are enacted and implemented at the state level. In 2016, Prime Minister Najib Razak denounced atheism, secularism, liberalism, and humanism as threats to "Islam and the state". He also stated that "we will not tolerate any demands or right to apostasy by Muslims". In response to an August 2017 meeting in Kuala Lumpur of members of the Malaysian chapter of the Canadian organization Atheist Republic, Minister in the Prime Minister's Department Shahidan Kassim declared that atheists would be "hunted down", attributing their beliefs to a lack of religious education. The Malaysian government started a crackdown not long afterwards to find if Muslims had any role in the incident. This response was criticized by both the founder of Atheist Republic, Armin Navabi, as well as some Malaysian Muslims.

In the non-Muslim marriage registration forms issued by the National Registration Department, marriage applicants are allowed to declare their religious status as atheism or "Tiada agama" (no religion). In 2007, an ex-Christian Malaysian named Cecilia John also reported successfully registering as "no religion" on their Malaysian identity card (MyKad).

== Concerns ==
The fear of violence toward Malaysian atheists is compounded by incidents of similar violence in Bangladesh, where atheist bloggers have been killed by extremists. The Diplomat writer David Hutt claimed that he knew pro-democracy activists from Vietnam who were less hesitant to publicly criticize the Communist Party than atheist Malaysians to simply talk about religion in coffee shops.
